= List of murines =

Species in mammal subfamily Murinae

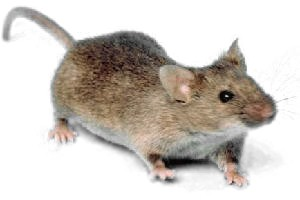
House mouse (Mus musculus)

Murinae is a subfamily of mammals in the rodent family Muridae, which in turn is part of the Myomorpha suborder in the order Rodentia. Members of this subfamily are called murines and include the Old World mice and rats. They are found in Africa, Australia, Asia, and Europe, primarily in forests, shrublands, grasslands, and savannas, though some species can be found in deserts, rocky areas, wetlands, and coastal areas. They range in size from the African pygmy mouse, at 4 cm (2 in) plus a 2 cm (1 in) tail, to the alpine woolly rat, at 47 cm (19 in) plus a 37 cm (15 in) tail. Murines generally eat a variety of vegetation and invertebrates. Few murines have population estimates, but 53 species are categorized as endangered, 13 are categorized as critically endangered, and 13 have been driven extinct since 1500.

The 642 extant species of Murinae are divided into 136 genera, ranging in size from 1 to 68 species. The house mouse has been domesticated as the fancy mouse to be kept as pets. Several extinct prehistoric murine species have been discovered, though due to ongoing research and discoveries, the exact number and categorization are not fixed.

== Conventions ==
IUCN Red List categories
Conservation status
- EX: Extinct (13 species)
- EW: Extinct in the wild (0 species)
- CR: Critically endangered (13 species)
- EN: Endangered (53 species)
- VU: Vulnerable (57 species)
- NT: Near threatened (31 species)
- LC: Least concern (374 species)

Other categories
- DD: Data deficient (104 species)
- NE: Not evaluated (10 species)

The author citation for the species or genus is given after the scientific name; parentheses around the author citation indicate that this was not the original taxonomic placement. Conservation status codes listed follow the International Union for Conservation of Nature (IUCN) Red List of Threatened Species. Range maps are provided wherever possible; if a range map is not available, a description of the gerbilline's range is provided. Ranges are based on the IUCN Red List for that species unless otherwise noted. All extinct species, subspecies, or genera listed alongside extant species went extinct after 1500 CE, and are indicated by a dagger symbol: "†".

== Classification ==
Murinae is a subfamily of the rodent family Muridae consisting of 642 extant species in 136 genera. These genera range in size from 1 to 68 species. Additionally, 13 species have been driven extinct since 1500. This does not include hybrid species or extinct prehistoric species.

Subfamily Murinae

- Genus Abditomys (Luzon broad-toothed rat): one species
- Genus Abeomelomys (Highland brush mouse): one species
- Genus Aethomys (rock rats): nine species
- Genus Anisomys (squirrel-toothed rat): one species
- Genus Anonymomys (Mindoro climbing rat): one species
- Genus Apodemus (field mice): twenty species
- Genus Apomys (earthworm mice): nineteen species
- Genus Archboldomys (shrew-mice): two species
- Genus Arvicanthis (unstriped grass rats): seven species
- Genus Baiyankamys (mountain water rats): two species
- Genus Bandicota (bandicoot rats): three species
- Genus Batomys (hairy-tailed rats): six species
- Genus Berylmys (white-toothed rats): five species
- Genus Brassomys (white-toothed brush mouse): one species
- Genus Bullimus (large forest rats): three species
- Genus Bunomys (hill rats): seven species
- Genus Carpomys (Luzon tree rats): two species
- Genus Chiromyscus (Fea's tree rat): one species
- Genus Chiropodomys (pencil-tailed tree mice): six species
- Genus Chiruromys (tree mice): two species
- Genus Chrotomys (striped shrew-rats): five species
- Genus Coccymys (brush mice): three species
- Genus Colomys (African wading rat): one species
- Genus Conilurus (rabbit rats): three species (two extinct)
- Genus Crateromys (bushy-tailed cloud rats): four species
- Genus Cremnomys (Cutch rats): two species
- Genus Crossomys (earless water rat): one species
- Genus Crunomys (shrew-rats): four species
- Genus Dacnomys (Millard's rat): one species
- Genus Dasymys (marsh rats): nine species
- Genus Dephomys (Ivory Coast rats): two species
- Genus Desmomys (scrub rats): two species
- Genus Diomys (Crump's mouse): one species
- Genus Diplothrix (Ryukyu long-tailed giant rat): one species
- Genus Echiothrix (echiothrixes): two species
- Genus Eropeplus (Sulawesi soft-furred rat): one species
- Genus Frateromys (northeastern peninsula hill rat): one species
- Genus Golunda (Indian bush rat): one species
- Genus Gracilimus (Sulawesi root rat): one species
- Genus Grammomys (thicket rats): eleven species
- Genus Hadromys (bush rats): two species
- Genus Haeromys (ranee mice): three species
- Genus Halmaheramys (Halmahera spiny rats): two species
- Genus Hapalomys (marmoset rats): three species
- Genus Heimyscus (African smoky mouse): one species
- Genus Hybomys (striped mice): six species
- Genus Hydromys (water rats): four species
- Genus Hylomyscus (wood mice): sixteen species
- Genus Hyomys (white-eared giant rats): two species
- Genus Hyorhinomys (hog-nosed shrew rat): one species
- Genus Kadarsanomys (Sody's tree rat): one species
- Genus Komodomys (Komodo rat): one species
- Genus Lamottemys (Mount Oku rat): one species
- Genus Leggadina (short-tailed mice): two species
- Genus Lemniscomys (striped grass mice): eleven species
- Genus Lenomys (trefoil-toothed giant rat): one species
- Genus Lenothrix (gray tree rat): one species
- Genus Leopoldamys (long-tailed giant rats): seven species
- Genus Leporillus (stick-nest rats): two species (one extinct)
- Genus Leptomys (narrow water rats): five species
- Genus Limnomys (mountain rats): two species
- Genus Lorentzimys (New Guinean jumping mouse): one species
- Genus Macruromys (small-toothed rats): two species
- Genus Madromys (Blanford's rat): one species
- Genus Malacomys (swamp rats): three species
- Genus Mallomys (woolly rats): four species
- Genus Mammelomys (large mosaic-tailed rats): two species
- Genus Margaretamys (margareta rats): four species
- Genus Mastacomys (broad-toothed mouse): one species
- Genus Mastomys (multimammate mice): eight species
- Genus Maxomys (spiny rats): eighteen species
- Genus Melasmothrix (Sulawesian shrew rat): one species
- Genus Melomys (mosaic-tailed rats): twenty-two species (one extinct)
- Genus Mesembriomys (tree-rats): two species
- Genus Micaelamys (rock mice): two species
- Genus Microhydromys (groove-toothed shrew mice): two species
- Genus Micromys (Eurasian harvest mouse): one species
- Genus Millardia (soft-furred rats): four species
- Genus Mirzamys (moss rats): two species
- Genus Muriculus (Ethiopian striped mouse): one species
- Genus Mus (mice): thirty-nine species
- Genus Musseromys (tree-mice): four species
- Genus Mylomys (groove-toothed rats): two species
- Genus Myomyscus (white-footed rats): four species
- Genus Nesokia (short-tailed bandicoot rats): two species
- Genus Nesoromys (Ceram rat): one species
- Genus Nilopegamys (Ethiopian amphibious rat): one species
- Genus Niviventer (white-bellied rats): seventeen species
- Genus Notomys (hopping mice): ten species (five extinct)
- Genus Oenomys (rufous-nosed rats): two species
- Genus Otomys (vlei rats): twenty-eight species
- Genus Palawanomys (Palawan soft-furred mountain rat): one species
- Genus Papagomys (Flores giant rat): one species
- Genus Parahydromys (New Guinea waterside rat): one species
- Genus Paraleptomys (short-haired water rats): two species
- Genus Paramelomys (long-nosed mosaic-tailed rats): nine species
- Genus Parotomys (whistling rats): two species
- Genus Paucidentomys (Edented Sulawesi rat): one species
- Genus Paulamys (paulamys): one species
- Genus Pelomys (groove-toothed swamp rats): five species
- Genus Phloeomys (slender-tailed cloud rats): two species
- Genus Pithecheir (tree rats): two species
- Genus Pithecheirops (Bornean pithecheirops): one species
- Genus Pogonomelomys (lowland brush mice): three species
- Genus Pogonomys (prehensile-tailed rats): five species
- Genus Praomys (soft-furred mice): seventeen species
- Genus Protochromys (red-bellied mosaic-tailed rat): one species
- Genus Pseudohydromys (moss mice): twelve species
- Genus Pseudomys (pebble-mound mice): twenty-three species (two extinct)
- Genus Rattus (rats): sixty-eight species (two extinct)
- Genus Rhabdomys (four-striped grass rats): four species
- Genus Rhynchomys (shrewlike rats): four species
- Genus Saxatilomys (Paulina's limestone rat): one species
- Genus Solomys (naked-tailed rats): four species
- Genus Sommeromys (Sommer's Sulawesi rat): one species
- Genus Soricomys (shrew mice): four species
- Genus Srilankamys (Ohiya rat): one species
- Genus Stenocephalemys (narrow-headed rats): four species
- Genus Stochomys (target rat): one species
- Genus Sundamys (giant Sunda rats): three species
- Genus Taeromys (Sulawesi rats): eight species
- Genus Tarsomys (long-footed rats): two species
- Genus Tateomys (long-tailed shrew rats): two species
- Genus Thallomys (acacia rats): four species
- Genus Thamnomys (thicket rats): four species
- Genus Tokudaia (Ryūkyū spiny rats): three species
- Genus Tonkinomys (Daovantien's limestone rat): one species
- Genus Tryphomys (Luzon short-nosed rat): one species
- Genus Uromys (giant rats): eleven species
- Genus Vandeleuria (long-tailed climbing mice): three species
- Genus Vernaya (red climbing mouse): one species
- Genus Waiomys (Sulawesi water rat): one species
- Genus Xenuromys (mimic tree rat): one species
- Genus Xeromys (water mouse): one species
- Genus Zelotomys (broad-headed mice): two species
- Genus Zyzomys (rock rats): five species

== Murines ==
The following classification is based on the taxonomy described by the reference work Mammal Species of the World (2005), with augmentation by generally accepted proposals made since using molecular phylogenetic analysis, as supported by both the IUCN and the American Society of Mammalogists.

Genus Abditomys – Musser, 1982 – one species
Common name	Scientific name and subspecies	Range	Size and ecology	IUCN status and estimated population
Luzon broad-toothed rat	A. latidens (Sanborn, 1952)	Philippines	Size: 23–27 cm (9–11 in) long, plus 22–24 cm (9 in) tail Habitat: Forest Diet: Vegetation	DD Unknown

Genus Abeomelomys – Menzies, 1990 – one species
Common name	Scientific name and subspecies	Range	Size and ecology	IUCN status and estimated population
Highland brush mouse	A. sevia (Tate & Archbold, 1935)	Papua New Guinea	Size: 11–14 cm (4–6 in) long, plus 14–20 cm (6–8 in) tail Habitat: Grassland and forest Diet: Plant material and invertebrates	LC Unknown

Genus Aethomys – Thomas, 1915 – nine species
Common name	Scientific name and subspecies	Range	Size and ecology	IUCN status and estimated population
Bocage's rock rat	A. bocagei (Thomas, 1904)	Western Angola and western Democratic Republic of the Congo	Size: 14–20 cm (6–8 in) long, plus 15–18 cm (6–7 in) tail Habitat: Savanna and forest Diet: Grain, seeds, roots, nuts, and fruit	LC Unknown
Hinde's rock rat	A. hindei (Thomas, 1902)	Central and eastern Africa	Size: 12–18 cm (5–7 in) long, plus 12–19 cm (5–7 in) tail Habitat: Grassland, savanna, and forest Diet: Grain, seeds, roots, nuts, and fruit	LC Unknown
Kaiser's rock rat	A. kaiseri (Noack, 1887)	Central Africa	Size: 13–20 cm (5–8 in) long, plus 12–17 cm (5–7 in) tail Habitat: Forest and savanna Diet: Grain, seeds, roots, nuts, and fruit	LC Unknown
Nyika rock rat	A. nyikae (Thomas, 1897)	Central Africa	Size: 12–16 cm (5–6 in) long, plus 14–18 cm (6–7 in) tail Habitat: Forest Diet: Grain, seeds, roots, nuts, and fruit	LC Unknown
Red rock rat	A. chrysophilus (De Winton, 1897)	Southern and eastern Africa	Size: 12–17 cm (5–7 in) long, plus 13–19 cm (5–7 in) tail Habitat: Savanna and forest Diet: Grain, seeds, roots, nuts, and fruit	LC Unknown
Selinda veld rat	A. silindensis Roberts, 1938	Eastern Zimbabwe and western Mozambique	Size: 15–20 cm (6–8 in) long, plus 16–20 cm (6–8 in) tail Habitat: Rocky areas and forest Diet: Grain, seeds, roots, nuts, and fruit	DD Unknown
Tete veld aethomys	A. ineptus (Thomas & Wroughton, 1908)	Southern Africa	Size: 14–16 cm (6 in) long, plus 14–17 cm (6–7 in) tail Habitat: Shrubland, forest, and grassland Diet: Grain, seeds, roots, nuts, and fruit	LC Unknown
Thomas's rock rat	A. thomasi (De Winton, 1897)	Angola	Size: 14–17 cm (6–7 in) long, plus 11–14 cm (4–6 in) tail Habitat: Shrubland Diet: Grain, seeds, roots, nuts, and fruit	LC Unknown
Tinfields rock rat	A. stannarius (Thomas, 1913)	Nigeria and northern Cameroon	Size: 12–17 cm (5–7 in) long, plus 12–20 cm (5–8 in) tail Habitat: Savanna, grassland, and shrubland Diet: Grain, seeds, roots, nuts, and fruit	DD Unknown

Genus Anisomys – Thomas, 1904 – one species
Common name	Scientific name and subspecies	Range	Size and ecology	IUCN status and estimated population
Squirrel-toothed rat	A. imitator Thomas, 1904	New Guinea	Size: 21–28 cm (8–11 in) long, plus 27–36 cm (11–14 in) tail Habitat: Forest Diet: Nuts and other vegetation	LC Unknown

Genus Anonymomys – Musser, 1981 – one species
Common name	Scientific name and subspecies	Range	Size and ecology	IUCN status and estimated population
Mindoro climbing rat	A. mindorensis Musser, 1981	Philippines	Size: 14–15 cm (6 in) long, plus 19–22 cm (7–9 in) tail Habitat: Forest Diet: Plant material and invertebrates	DD Unknown

Genus Apodemus – Kaup, 1829 – 20 species
Common name	Scientific name and subspecies	Range	Size and ecology	IUCN status and estimated population
Alpine field mouse	A. alpicola Heinrich, 1952	Central Europe	Size: 7–12 cm (3–5 in) long, plus 10–14 cm (4–6 in) tail Habitat: Forest Diet: Roots, grain, seeds, berries, nuts, and insects	LC Unknown
Black Sea field mouse	A. ponticus (Sviridenko, 1936)	Western Asia	Size: 8–11 cm (3–4 in) long, plus 9–11 cm (4 in) tail Habitat: Shrubland, forest, and grassland Diet: Roots, grain, seeds, berries, nuts, and insects	LC Unknown
Caucasus field mouse	A. hyrcanicus Vorontsov, Boyeskorov, & Mezhzherin, 1992	West-central Asia	Size: 9–11 cm (4 in) long, plus 9–11 cm (4 in) tail Habitat: Forest Diet: Roots, grain, seeds, berries, nuts, and insects	NT Unknown
Chevrier's field mouse	A. chevrieri (A. Milne-Edwards, 1868)	China	Size: 8–11 cm (3–4 in) long, plus 8–11 cm (3–4 in) tail Habitat: Grassland and forest Diet: Roots, grain, seeds, berries, nuts, and insects	LC Unknown
Eastern broad-toothed field mouse	A. mystacinus (Alston, 1877)	Western Asia and Crete	Size: 9–14 cm (4–6 in) long, plus 9–15 cm (4–6 in) tail Habitat: Forest and rocky areas Diet: Roots, grain, seeds, berries, nuts, and insects	LC Unknown
Himalayan field mouse	A. gurkha Thomas, 1924	Nepal	Size: 8–12 cm (3–5 in) long, plus 9–13 cm (4–5 in) tail Habitat: Forest Diet: Roots, grain, seeds, berries, nuts, and insects	LC Unknown
Kashmir field mouse	A. rusiges Miller, 1913	Central Asia	Size: 7–12 cm (3–5 in) long, plus 7–13 cm (3–5 in) tail Habitat: Forest Diet: Roots, grain, seeds, berries, nuts, and insects	LC Unknown
Korean field mouse	A. peninsulae (Thomas, 1907)	Eastern Asia	Size: 8–12 cm (3–5 in) long, plus 7–11 cm (3–4 in) tail Habitat: Grassland, forest, shrubland, and inland wetlands Diet: Roots, grain, seeds, berries, nuts, and insects	LC Unknown
Large Japanese field mouse	A. speciosus (Temminck, 1844)	Japan	Size: 8–14 cm (3–6 in) long, plus 7–13 cm (3–5 in) tail Habitat: Grassland and forest Diet: Roots, grain, seeds, berries, nuts, and insects	LC Unknown
Sichuan field mouse	A. latronum Thomas, 1911	East-central Asia	Size: 9–11 cm (4 in) long, plus 10–12 cm (4–5 in) tail Habitat: Shrubland, forest, and grassland Diet: Roots, grain, seeds, berries, nuts, and insects	LC Unknown
Small Japanese field mouse	A. argenteus (Temminck, 1844)	Japan	Size: 6–10 cm (2–4 in) long, plus 7–11 cm (3–4 in) tail Habitat: Forest Diet: Roots, grain, seeds, berries, nuts, and insects	LC Unknown
South China field mouse	A. draco (Barrett-Hamilton, 1900)	Eastern Asia	Size: Unknown Habitat: Forest, shrubland, and grassland Diet: Roots, grain, seeds, berries, nuts, and insects	LC Unknown
Steppe field mouse	A. witherbyi (Thomas, 1902)	Western Asia and Ukraine	Size: 7–11 cm (3–4 in) long, plus 7–12 cm (3–5 in) tail Habitat: Shrubland Diet: Roots, grain, seeds, berries, nuts, and insects	LC Unknown
Striped field mouse	A. agrarius (Pallas, 1771)	Europe and Asia	Size: 7–12 cm (3–5 in) long, plus 6–12 cm (2–5 in) tail Habitat: Inland wetlands, grassland, and forest Diet: Roots, grain, seeds, berries, nuts, and insects	LC Unknown
Taiwan field mouse	A. semotus Thomas, 1908	Taiwan	Size: 8–10 cm (3–4 in) long, plus 10–12 cm (4–5 in) tail Habitat: Grassland, forest, and shrubland Diet: Roots, grain, seeds, berries, nuts, and insects	LC Unknown
Ural field mouse	A. uralensis (Pallas, 1811)	Europe and western and central Asia	Size: 7–11 cm (3–4 in) long, plus 6–11 cm (2–4 in) tail Habitat: Grassland, forest, inland wetlands, and shrubland Diet: Roots, grain, seeds, berries, nuts, and insects	LC Unknown
Ward's field mouse	A. pallipes (Barrett-Hamilton, 1900)	Central Asia	Size: 7–11 cm (3–4 in) long, plus 7–11 cm (3–4 in) tail Habitat: Forest Diet: Roots, grain, seeds, berries, nuts, and insects	LC Unknown
Western broad-toothed field mouse	A. epimelas (Nehring, 1902)	Southeastern Asia	Size: 10–15 cm (4–6 in) long, plus 10–15 cm (4–6 in) tail Habitat: Rocky areas Diet: Roots, grain, seeds, berries, nuts, and insects	LC Unknown
Wood mouse	A. sylvaticus (Linnaeus, 1758)	Europe, northern Africa, and western Russia	Size: 8–11 cm (3–4 in) long, plus 7–12 cm (3–5 in) tail Habitat: Shrubland, forest, coastal marine, and grassland Diet: Roots, grain, seeds, berries, nuts, and insects	LC Unknown
Yellow-necked mouse	A. flavicollis (Melchior, 1834)	Europe and western Asia	Size: 8–13 cm (3–5 in) long, plus 8–14 cm (3–6 in) tail Habitat: Forest, inland wetlands, and shrubland Diet: Roots, grain, seeds, berries, nuts, and insects	LC Unknown

Genus Apomys – Mearns, 1905 – nineteen species
Common name	Scientific name and subspecies	Range	Size and ecology	IUCN status and estimated population
Camiguin forest mouse	A. camiguinensis Heaney & Tabaranza, 2006	Island of Camiguin in the Philippines	Size: About 11 cm (4 in) long, plus 14–16 cm (6 in) tail Habitat: Forest Diet: Omnivorous	VU Unknown
Large Mindoro forest mouse	A. gracilirostris Ruedas, 1995	Island of Mindoro in the Philippines (in red)	Size: 13–15 cm (5–6 in) long, plus 13–19 cm (5–7 in) tail Habitat: Forest Diet: Omnivorous	LC Unknown
Least forest mouse	A. musculus Miller, 1911	Philippines	Size: 7–13 cm (3–5 in) long, plus 9–13 cm (4–5 in) tail Habitat: Forest Diet: Omnivorous	LC Unknown
Long-nosed Luzon forest mouse	A. sacobianus Johnson, 1962	Philippines	Size: 13–16 cm (5–6 in) long, plus 11–16 cm (4–6 in) tail Habitat: Forest Diet: Omnivorous	LC Unknown
Lubang forest mouse	A. lubangensis Heaney, Balete, Veluz, Steppan, Esseltyn, Pfeiffer, & Rickart, 2014	Lubang Island in the Philippines	Size: 14–16 cm (6 in) long, plus 12–16 cm (5–6 in) tail Habitat: Forest Diet: Omnivorous	LC Unknown
Luzon Aurora forest mouse	A. aurorae Heaney, Balete, Rickart, Alviola, Duya, Duya, Veluz, VandeVrede, & Steppan, 2011	Island of Luzon in the Philippines	Size: 12–16 cm (5–6 in) long, plus 12–16 cm (5–6 in) tail Habitat: Forest Diet: Omnivorous	LC Unknown
Luzon Cordillera forest mouse	A. abrae (Sanborn, 1952)	Luzon island	Size: 12–15 cm (5–6 in) long, plus 12–15 cm (5–6 in) tail Habitat: Forest and grassland Diet: Omnivorous	LC Unknown
Luzon Zambales forest mouse	A. zambalensis Heaney, Balete, Rickart, Alviola, Duya, Duya, Veluz, VandeVrede, & Steppan, 2011	Luzon island	Size: 12–17 cm (5–7 in) long, plus 12–16 cm (5–6 in) tail Habitat: Forest Diet: Omnivorous	LC Unknown
Luzon giant forest mouse	A. magnus Heaney, Balete, Rickart, Alviola, Duya, Duya, Veluz, VandeVrede, & Steppan, 2011	Luzon island	Size: 13–16 cm (5–6 in) long, plus 13–16 cm (5–6 in) tail Habitat: Forest Diet: Omnivorous	LC Unknown
Luzon montane forest mouse	A. datae (Von Meyer, 1899)	Luzon island	Size: 12–16 cm (5–6 in) long, plus 12–14 cm (5–6 in) tail Habitat: Forest and shrubland Diet: Omnivorous	LC Unknown
Mindanao lowland forest mouse	A. littoralis (Sanborn, 1952)	Island of Mindanao in the Philippines	Size: 10–11 cm (4 in) long, plus 12–13 cm (5 in) tail Habitat: Forest Diet: Omnivorous	DD Unknown
Mindanao montane forest mouse	A. insignis Mearns, 1905	Mindanao island	Size: 7–13 cm (3–5 in) long, plus 13–18 cm (5–7 in) tail Habitat: Forest Diet: Omnivorous	LC Unknown
Mount Apo forest mouse	A. hylocetes Mearns, 1905	Mindanao island	Size: 11–12 cm (4–5 in) long, plus 12–15 cm (5–6 in) tail Habitat: Forest Diet: Omnivorous	LC Unknown
Mount Banahaw forest mouse	A. banahao Heaney, 2011	Luzon island	Size: 12–16 cm (5–6 in) long, plus 11–14 cm (4–6 in) tail Habitat: Forest Diet: Omnivorous	LC Unknown
Mount Irid forest mouse	A. iridensis Heaney, Balete, Veluz, Steppan, Esseltyn, Pfeiffer, & Rickart, 2014	Luzon island	Size: 13–16 cm (5–6 in) long, plus 13–16 cm (5–6 in) tail Habitat: Forest Diet: Omnivorous	LC Unknown
Mount Mingan forest mouse	A. minganensis Heaney, Balete, Rickart, Alviola, Duya, Duya, Veluz, VandeVrede, & Steppan, 2011	Luzon island	Size: 13–14 cm (5–6 in) long, plus 11–14 cm (4–6 in) tail Habitat: Forest Diet: Omnivorous	LC Unknown
Mount Tapulao forest mouse	A. brownorum Heaney, 2011	Luzon island	Size: 12–14 cm (5–6 in) long, plus 10–12 cm (4–5 in) tail Habitat: Forest Diet: Omnivorous	DD Unknown
Sierra Madre forest mouse	A. sierrae Heaney, 2011	Luzon island	Size: 12–18 cm (5–7 in) long, plus 11–16 cm (4–6 in) tail Habitat: Forest Diet: Omnivorous	LC Unknown
Small Luzon forest mouse	A. microdon Hollister, 1913	Philippines	Size: 9–11 cm (4 in) long, plus 12–15 cm (5–6 in) tail Habitat: Forest Diet: Omnivorous	LC Unknown

Genus Archboldomys – Musser, 1982 – two species
Common name	Scientific name and subspecies	Range	Size and ecology	IUCN status and estimated population
Large Cordillera shrew-mouse	A. maximus Balete, Rickart, Heaney, Alviola, Duya, Duya, Sosa, & Jansa, 2012	Luzon island	Size: 10–12 cm (4–5 in) long, plus 9–11 cm (4 in) tail Habitat: Forest Diet: Worms and soft-bodied invertebrates	DD Unknown
Mount Isarog shrew-mouse	A. luzonensis Musser, 1982	Luzon island	Size: 10–12 cm (4–5 in) long, plus 6–8 cm (2–3 in) tail Habitat: Forest Diet: Worms and soft-bodied invertebrates	VU Unknown

Genus Arvicanthis – Lesson, 1842 – seven species
Common name	Scientific name and subspecies	Range	Size and ecology	IUCN status and estimated population
Abyssinian grass rat	A. abyssinicus (Rüppell, 1842)	Ethiopia	Size: 12–15 cm (5–6 in) long, plus 9–11 cm (4 in) tail Habitat: Grassland Diet: Seeds, leaves, grass, and grain	LC Unknown
African grass rat	A. niloticus (É. Geoffrey, 1803)	Northern and central Africa	Size: 12–19 cm (5–7 in) long, plus 9–16 cm (4–6 in) tail Habitat: Savanna, shrubland, and grassland Diet: Seeds, leaves, grass, and grain	LC Unknown
Blick's grass rat	A. blicki Frick, 1914	Ethiopia	Size: 16–18 cm (6–7 in) long, plus 10–12 cm (4–5 in) tail Habitat: Grassland Diet: Seeds, leaves, grass, and grain	NT Unknown
Guinean grass rat	A. rufinus (Temminck, 1853)	Western Africa	Size: 11–18 cm (4–7 in) long, plus 12–15 cm (5–6 in) tail Habitat: Shrubland and savanna Diet: Seeds, leaves, grass, and grain	LC Unknown
Nairobi grass rat	A. nairobae J. A. Allen, 1909	Kenya and Tanzania	Size: 11–17 cm (4–7 in) long, plus 9–13 cm (4–5 in) tail Habitat: Savanna Diet: Seeds, leaves, grass, and grain	LC Unknown
Neumann's grass rat	A. neumanni (Matschie, 1894)	Eastern Africa	Size: 11–16 cm (4–6 in) long, plus 8–12 cm (3–5 in) tail Habitat: Savanna and shrubland Diet: Seeds, leaves, grass, and grain	LC Unknown
Sudanian grass rat	A. ansorgei Thomas, 1910	Western Africa	Size: 12–18 cm (5–7 in) long, plus 11–16 cm (4–6 in) tail Habitat: Shrubland and grassland Diet: Seeds, leaves, grass, and grain	LC Unknown

Genus Baiyankamys – Hinton, 1943 – two species
Common name	Scientific name and subspecies	Range	Size and ecology	IUCN status and estimated population
Mountain water rat	B. habbema (Tate & Archbold, 1941)	Western New Guinea	Size: 13–16 cm (5–6 in) long, plus 15–19 cm (6–7 in) tail Habitat: Shrubland, grassland, and inland wetlands Diet: Fish and aquatic insects, as well as spiders, crustaceans, mussels, frogs, turtles, birds, and bats	DD Unknown
Shaw Mayer's water rat	B. shawmayeri Hinton, 1943	Papua New Guinea	Size: 13–16 cm (5–6 in) long, plus 14–19 cm (6–7 in) tail Habitat: Forest and inland wetlands Diet: Fish and aquatic insects, as well as spiders, crustaceans, mussels, frogs, turtles, birds, and bats	LC Unknown

Genus Bandicota – Gray, 1873 – three species
Common name	Scientific name and subspecies	Range	Size and ecology	IUCN status and estimated population
Greater bandicoot rat	B. indica (Bechstein, 1800)	Southern and southeastern Asia	Size: 18–35 cm (7–14 in) long, plus 14–28 cm (6–11 in) tail Habitat: Grassland, shrubland, and inland wetlands Diet: Omnivorous	LC Unknown
Lesser bandicoot rat	B. bengalensis Gray, 1835	Southern and southeastern Asia	Size: 16–24 cm (6–9 in) long, plus 11–19 cm (4–7 in) tail Habitat: Grassland, forest, shrubland, and inland wetlands Diet: Omnivorous	LC Unknown
Savile's bandicoot rat	B. savilei Thomas, 1916	Southeastern Asia	Size: 14–22 cm (6–9 in) long, plus 7–18 cm (3–7 in) tail Habitat: Diet: Omnivorous	LC Unknown

Genus Batomys – Thomas, 1895 – six species
Common name	Scientific name and subspecies	Range	Size and ecology	IUCN status and estimated population
Dinagat hairy-tailed rat	B. russatus Musser, Heaney, & Tabaranza, 1998	Dinagat Island in the Philippines	Size: 14–16 cm (6 in) long, plus 10–12 cm (4–5 in) tail Habitat: Forest Diet: Leaves, seeds, and fruit	EN Unknown
Hamiguitan hairy-tailed rat	B. hamiguitan Balete, Heaney, Rickart, Quidlat, & Ibanez, 2008	Philippines	Size: 17–19 cm (7 in) long, plus 11–13 cm (4–5 in) tail Habitat: Forest Diet: Leaves, seeds, and fruit	DD Unknown
Large-toothed hairy-tailed rat	B. dentatus Miller, 1911	Luzon island	Size: About 20 cm (8 in) long, plus about 19 cm (7 in) tail Habitat: Forest Diet: Leaves, seeds, and fruit	DD Unknown
Luzon Cordillera hairy-tailed rat	B. granti Thomas, 1895	Luzon island	Size: 18–20 cm (7–8 in) long, plus 14–18 cm (6–7 in) tail Habitat: Forest Diet: Leaves, seeds, and fruit	LC Unknown
Mindanao hairy-tailed rat	B. salomonseni (Sanborn, 1953)	Philippines	Size: 13–20 cm (5–8 in) long, plus 13–17 cm (5–7 in) tail Habitat: Forest Diet: Leaves, seeds, and fruit	LC Unknown
Mount Isarog hairy-tailed rat	B. uragon Balete, Rickart, Heaney, & Jansa, 2015	Luzon island	Size: 17–21 cm (7–8 in) long, plus 12–18 cm (5–7 in) tail Habitat: Forest Diet: Leaves, seeds, and fruit	LC Unknown

Genus Berylmys – Ellerman, 1947 – five species
Common name	Scientific name and subspecies	Range	Size and ecology	IUCN status and estimated population
Bower's white-toothed rat	B. bowersi (Anderson, 1878)	Southeastern Asia	Size: 23–30 cm (9–12 in) long, plus 24–31 cm (9–12 in) tail Habitat: Forest and shrubland Diet: Leaves, grass, seeds, fruit, insects, molluscs, and worms	LC Unknown
Kenneth's white-toothed rat	B. mackenziei (Thomas, 1916)	Southeastern Asia	Size: 15–24 cm (6–9 in) long, plus 15–25 cm (6–10 in) tail Habitat: Forest Diet: Leaves, grass, seeds, fruit, insects, molluscs, and worms	LC Unknown
Manipur white-toothed rat	B. manipulus (Thomas, 1916)	Southeastern Asia	Size: 13–19 cm (5–7 in) long, plus 14–19 cm (6–7 in) tail Habitat: Forest, shrubland, and grassland Diet: Leaves, grass, seeds, fruit, insects, molluscs, and worms	LC Unknown
Small white-toothed rat	B. berdmorei (Blyth, 1851)	Southeastern Asia	Size: 19–25 cm (7–10 in) long, plus 14–20 cm (6–8 in) tail Habitat: Forest Diet: Leaves, grass, seeds, fruit, insects, molluscs, and worms	LC Unknown
West Chinese white-toothed rat	B. latouchei Thomas, 1897	Eastern China	Size: 23–30 cm (9–12 in) long, plus 24–31 cm (9–12 in) tail Habitat: Forest Diet: Leaves, grass, seeds, fruit, insects, molluscs, and worms	LC Unknown

Genus Brassomys – Musser & Lunde, 2009 – one species
Common name	Scientific name and subspecies	Range	Size and ecology	IUCN status and estimated population
White-toothed brush mouse	B. albidens (Tate, 1951)	Western New Guinea	Size: 11–13 cm (4–5 in) long, plus 14–17 cm (6–7 in) tail Habitat: Grassland and shrubland Diet: Leaves and other vegetation	DD Unknown

Genus Bullimus – Mearns, 1905 – three species
Common name	Scientific name and subspecies	Range	Size and ecology	IUCN status and estimated population
Bagobo rat	B. bagobus Mearns, 1905	Philippines	Size: 23–27 cm (9–11 in) long, plus 17–20 cm (7–8 in) tail Habitat: Forest Diet: Plant material and invertebrates	LC Unknown
Camiguin forest rat	B. gamay Rickart, Heaney, & Tabaranza, 2002	Camiguin	Size: 22–24 cm (9 in) long, plus 14–20 cm (6–8 in) tail Habitat: Forest Diet: Plant material and invertebrates	VU Unknown
Large Luzon forest rat	B. luzonicus (Thomas, 1895)	Luzon island	Size: 23–27 cm (9–11 in) long, plus 19–23 cm (7–9 in) tail Habitat: Forest and shrubland Diet: Plant material and invertebrates	LC Unknown

Genus Bunomys – Thomas, 1910 – seven species
Common name	Scientific name and subspecies	Range	Size and ecology	IUCN status and estimated population
Andrew's hill rat	B. andrewsi (J. A. Allen, 1911)	Indonesia	Size: 13–20 cm (5–8 in) long, plus 11–17 cm (4–7 in) tail Habitat: Shrubland and forest Diet: Fruit, insects, snails, and worms	LC Unknown
Heavenly hill rat	B. coelestis (Thomas, 1896)	Sulawesi Island in Indonesia	Size: 14–18 cm (6–7 in) long, plus 13–17 cm (5–7 in) tail Habitat: Forest Diet: Fruit, insects, snails, and worms	EN Unknown
Inland hill rat	B. penitus (Miller & Hollister, 1921)	Sulawesi island	Size: 15–24 cm (6–9 in) long, plus 13–19 cm (5–7 in) tail Habitat: Forest Diet: Fruit, insects, snails, and worms	LC Unknown
Karoko hill rat	B. karokophilus Musser, 2014	Sulawesi island	Size: 15–19 cm (6–7 in) long, plus 13–20 cm (5–8 in) tail Habitat: Forest Diet: Fruit, insects, snails, and worms	VU Unknown
Long-headed hill rat	B. prolatus Musser, 1991	Sulawesi island	Size: 15–18 cm (6–7 in) long, plus 12–15 cm (5–6 in) tail Habitat: Forest Diet: Fruit, insects, snails, and worms	VU Unknown
Tana Toraja hill rat	B. torajae Musser, 2014	Sulawesi island	Size: 15–18 cm (6–7 in) long, plus 16–17 cm (6–7 in) tail Habitat: Forest Diet: Fruit, insects, snails, and worms	NT Unknown
Yellow-haired hill rat	B. chrysocomus (Hoffmann, 1887)	Sulawesi island	Size: 9–18 cm (4–7 in) long, plus 9–18 cm (4–7 in) tail Habitat: Forest Diet: Fruit, insects, snails, and worms	LC Unknown

Genus Carpomys – Thomas, 1895 – two species
Common name	Scientific name and subspecies	Range	Size and ecology	IUCN status and estimated population
Short-footed Luzon tree rat	C. melanurus Thomas, 1895	Luzon island	Size: 18–19 cm (7 in) long, plus 18–19 cm (7 in) tail Habitat: Forest Diet: Plant material and invertebrates	DD Unknown
White-bellied Luzon tree rat	C. phaeurus Thomas, 1895	Luzon island	Size: 16–18 cm (6–7 in) long, plus 15–17 cm (6–7 in) tail Habitat: Forest Diet: Plant material and invertebrates	LC Unknown

Genus Chiromyscus – Thomas, 1925 – one species
Common name	Scientific name and subspecies	Range	Size and ecology	IUCN status and estimated population
Fea's tree rat	C. chiropus (Thomas, 1891)	Southeastern Asia	Size: 13–16 cm (5–6 in) long, plus 20–23 cm (8–9 in) tail Habitat: Shrubland and forest Diet: Plant material and invertebrates	LC Unknown

Genus Chiropodomys – Peters, 1869 – six species
Common name	Scientific name and subspecies	Range	Size and ecology	IUCN status and estimated population
Gray-bellied pencil-tailed tree mouse	C. muroides Medway, 1965	Southeastern Asia	Size: 6–9 cm (2–4 in) long, plus 8–10 cm (3–4 in) tail Habitat: Forest Diet: Vegetation	DD Unknown
Indomalayan pencil-tailed tree mouse	C. gliroides (Blyth, 1856)	Southeastern Asia	Size: 6–11 cm (2–4 in) long, plus 9–15 cm (4–6 in) tail Habitat: Forest Diet: Vegetation	LC Unknown
Koopman's pencil-tailed tree mouse	C. karlkoopmani Musser, 1979	Malaysia	Size: About 11 cm (4 in) long, plus about 17 cm (7 in) tail Habitat: Forest Diet: Vegetation	VU Unknown
Large pencil-tailed tree mouse	C. major Thomas, 1893	Malaysia and Indonesia	Size: 9–12 cm (4–5 in) long, plus 10–15 cm (4–6 in) tail Habitat: Forest Diet: Vegetation	LC Unknown
Palawan pencil-tailed tree mouse	C. calamianensis (Taylor, 1934)	Philippines	Size: 10–13 cm (4–5 in) long, plus 14–18 cm (6–7 in) tail Habitat: Forest Diet: Vegetation	DD Unknown
Small pencil-tailed tree mouse	C. pusillus Thomas, 1893	Borneo	Size: 6–8 cm (2–3 in) long, plus 8–10 cm (3–4 in) tail Habitat: Forest Diet: Vegetation	DD Unknown

Genus Chiruromys – Thomas, 1888 – three species
Common name	Scientific name and subspecies	Range	Size and ecology	IUCN status and estimated population
Broad-headed tree mouse	C. lamia Thomas, 1897	Papua New Guinea	Size: 9–12 cm (4–5 in) long, plus 14–18 cm (6–7 in) tail Habitat: Forest Diet: Leaves and grass and bamboo shoots	LC Unknown
Greater tree mouse	C. forbesi Thomas, 1888	Papua New Guinea	Size: 13–17 cm (5–7 in) long, plus 21–23 cm (8–9 in) tail Habitat: Forest Diet: Leaves and grass and bamboo shoots	LC Unknown
Lesser tree mouse	C. vates (Thomas, 1908)	Papua New Guinea	Size: 8–13 cm (3–5 in) long, plus 12–19 cm (5–7 in) tail Habitat: Forest Diet: Leaves and grass and bamboo shoots	LC Unknown

Genus Chrotomys – Thomas, 1895 – five species
Common name	Scientific name and subspecies	Range	Size and ecology	IUCN status and estimated population
Blazed Luzon shrew-rat	C. silaceus (Thomas, 1895)	Luzon island	Size: 13–18 cm (5–7 in) long, plus 9–13 cm (4–5 in) tail Habitat: Forest Diet: Sweet potatoes, grass, and worms	LC Unknown
Isarog striped shrew-rat	C. gonzalesi Heaney, 1991	Luzon island	Size: 16–19 cm (6–7 in) long, plus 8–11 cm (3–4 in) tail Habitat: Forest Diet: Sweet potatoes, grass, and worms	NT Unknown
Luzon striped rat	C. whiteheadi Thomas, 1895	Luzon island	Size: 14–18 cm (6–7 in) long, plus 9–14 cm (4–6 in) tail Habitat: Forest Diet: Sweet potatoes, grass, and worms	LC Unknown
Mindoro striped rat	C. mindorensis Kellogg, 1945	Philippines	Size: 15–19 cm (6–7 in) long, plus 9–13 cm (4–5 in) tail Habitat: Forest Diet: Sweet potatoes, grass, and worms	LC Unknown
Sibuyan striped shrew-rat	C. sibuyanensis Rickart, Heaney, Goodman, & Jansa, 2005	Sibuyan Island in the Philippines	Size: About 16 cm (6 in) long, plus about 8 cm (3 in) tail Habitat: Forest Diet: Sweet potatoes, grass, and worms	DD Unknown

Genus Coccymys – Menzies, 1990 – three species
Common name	Scientific name and subspecies	Range	Size and ecology	IUCN status and estimated population
Central Cordillera brush mouse	C. shawmayeri Musser & Lunde, 2009	Papua New Guinea	Size: 8–11 cm (3–4 in) long, plus 13–17 cm (5–7 in) tail Habitat: Grassland and forest Diet: Leaves and other vegetation	LC Unknown
Rümmler's brush mouse	C. ruemmleri (Tate & Archbold, 1941)	New Guinea	Size: 9–12 cm (4–5 in) long, plus 12–18 cm (5–7 in) tail Habitat: Forest and grassland Diet: Leaves and other vegetation	LC Unknown
Tawny brush mouse	C. kirrhos Musser & Lunde, 2009	Papua New Guinea	Size: 8–11 cm (3–4 in) long, plus 14–16 cm (6 in) tail Habitat: Forest Diet: Leaves and other vegetation	DD Unknown

Genus Colomys – Thomas & Wroughton, 1907 – one species
Common name	Scientific name and subspecies	Range	Size and ecology	IUCN status and estimated population
African wading rat	C. goslingi Thomas & Wroughton, 1907	Central Africa	Size: 10–16 cm (4–6 in) long, plus 14–19 cm (6–7 in) tail Habitat: Savanna, forest, grassland, and inland wetlands Diet: Worms, slugs, crustaceans, and aquatic insects, as well as small vertebrates and some vegetation	LC Unknown

Genus Conilurus – Ogilby, 1838 – three species
Common name	Scientific name and subspecies	Range	Size and ecology	IUCN status and estimated population
Brush-tailed rabbit rat	C. penicillatus (Gould, 1842)	Northern Australia and Papua New Guinea	Size: 15–20 cm (6–8 in) long, plus 17–21 cm (7–8 in) tail Habitat: Savanna and forest Diet: Plant material and invertebrates	VU 50,000
Capricorn rabbit rat †	C. capricornensis Cramb & Hocknull, 2010	Northeastern Australia	Size: Unknown Habitat: Savanna and forest Diet: Plant material and invertebrates	EX 0
White-footed rabbit rat †	C. albipes (Lichtenstein, 1829)	Southeastern Australia	Size: Unknown Habitat: Forest Diet: Plant material and invertebrates	EX 0

Genus Crateromys – Thomas, 1895 – four species
Common name	Scientific name and subspecies	Range	Size and ecology	IUCN status and estimated population
Dinagat bushy-tailed cloud rat	C. australis Musser, Heaney, & Rabor, 1985	Dinagat (in pink)	Size: About 26 cm (10 in) long, plus 28 cm (11 in) tail Habitat: Forest Diet: Fruit and pine tree sprouts, buds, and bark	EN Unknown
Giant bushy-tailed cloud rat	C. schadenbergi (Von Meyer, 1895)	Luzon island (in red)	Size: 30–37 cm (12–15 in) long, plus 30–39 cm (12–15 in) tail Habitat: Forest Diet: Fruit and pine tree sprouts, buds, and bark	EN Unknown
Ilin Island cloudrunner	C. paulus Musser & Gordon, 1981	Ilin Island in the Philippines (in blue)	Size: About 25 cm (10 in) long, plus about 21 cm (8 in) tail Habitat: Forest Diet: Fruit and pine tree sprouts, buds, and bark	DD Unknown
Panay cloudrunner	C. heaneyi Gonzales & Kennedy, 1996	Island of Panay in the Philippines (in green)	Size: About 28 cm (11 in) long, plus 30–34 cm (12–13 in) tail Habitat: Forest Diet: Fruit and pine tree sprouts, buds, and bark	EN Unknown

Genus Cremnomys – Wroughton, 1912 – two species
Common name	Scientific name and subspecies	Range	Size and ecology	IUCN status and estimated population
Cutch rat	C. cutchicus Wroughton, 1912	India	Size: 10–15 cm (4–6 in) long, plus 12–18 cm (5–7 in) tail Habitat: Forest, grassland, desert, and shrubland Diet: Plant material and invertebrates	LC Unknown
Elvira rat	C. elvira (Ellerman, 1946)	Southern India	Size: 12–15 cm (5–6 in) long, plus 18–20 cm (7–8 in) tail Habitat: Shrubland, forest, and rocky areas Diet: Plant material and invertebrates	CR Unknown

Genus Crossomys – Thomas, 1907 – one species
Common name	Scientific name and subspecies	Range	Size and ecology	IUCN status and estimated population
Earless water rat	C. moncktoni Thomas, 1907	New Guinea	Size: 17–23 cm (7–9 in) long, plus 21–27 cm (8–11 in) tail Habitat: Forest and inland wetlands Diet: Tadpoles, insects, mollusks, and small aquatic vertebrates	LC Unknown

Genus Crunomys – Thomas, 1897 – four species
Common name	Scientific name and subspecies	Range	Size and ecology	IUCN status and estimated population
Celebes shrew-rat	C. celebensis Musser, 1982	Sulawesi island	Size: 11–13 cm (4–5 in) long, plus 8–9 cm (3–4 in) tail Habitat: Forest Diet: Plant material and invertebrates	NT Unknown
Katanglad shrew-mouse	C. suncoides Rickart, Heaney, Tabaranza, & Balete, 1998	Mindanao island	Size: About 11 cm (4 in) long, plus about 8 cm (3 in) tail Habitat: Forest Diet: Plant material and invertebrates	DD Unknown
Mindanao shrew-rat	C. melanius Thomas, 1907	Philippines	Size: 9–14 cm (4–6 in) long, plus 6–10 cm (2–4 in) tail Habitat: Forest Diet: Plant material and invertebrates	LC Unknown
Northern Luzon shrew-rat	C. fallax Thomas, 1897	Luzon island	Size: About 11 cm (4 in) long, plus about 8 cm (3 in) tail Habitat: Forest Diet: Plant material and invertebrates	DD Unknown

Genus Dacnomys – Thomas, 1916 – one species
Common name	Scientific name and subspecies	Range	Size and ecology	IUCN status and estimated population
Millard's rat	D. millardi Thomas, 1916	Southeastern Asia	Size: 21–27 cm (8–11 in) long, plus 29–33 cm (11–13 in) tail Habitat: Forest Diet: Plant material and invertebrates	LC Unknown

Genus Dasymys – Peters, 1875 – nine species
Common name	Scientific name and subspecies	Range	Size and ecology	IUCN status and estimated population
African marsh rat	D. incomtus (Sundevall, 1847)	Sub-Saharan Africa (dark teal)	Size: 13–20 cm (5–8 in) long, plus 11–16 cm (4–6 in) tail Habitat: Forest, grassland, savanna, shrubland, and inland wetlands Diet: Aquatic plants, as well as insects	LC Unknown
Angolan marsh rat	D. nudipes (Peters, 1870)	Angola (red)	Size: 15–20 cm (6–8 in) long, plus 14–19 cm (6–7 in) tail Habitat: Inland wetlands and grassland Diet: Aquatic plants, as well as insects	DD Unknown
Crawford-Cabral's shaggy rat	D. cabrali Hulselmans, Dierckx, Colyn, Leirs, Verheyen, & Verheyen, 2003	Namibia (dark blue)	Size: About 16 cm (6 in) long, plus about 16 cm (6 in) tail Habitat: Forest, grassland, savanna, shrubland, and inland wetlands Diet: Aquatic plants, as well as insects	NE Unknown
Fox's shaggy rat	D. foxi Thomas, 1912	Nigeria (pink)	Size: About 15 cm (6 in) long, plus about 13 cm (5 in) tail Habitat: Inland wetlands, savanna, and grassland Diet: Aquatic plants, as well as insects	DD Unknown
Glover Allen's dasymys	D. alleni Lawrence & Loveridge, 1953	Tanzania (green)	Size: 11–18 cm (4–7 in) long, plus 10–14 cm (4–6 in) tail Habitat: Forest, grassland, savanna, shrubland, and inland wetlands Diet: Aquatic plants, as well as insects	NE Unknown
Montane shaggy rat	D. montanus Thomas, 1906	Western Uganda and eastern Democratic Republic of the Congo (brown)	Size: 13–16 cm (5–6 in) long, plus 9–12 cm (4–5 in) tail Habitat: Inland wetlands, forest, and grassland Diet: Aquatic plants, as well as insects	EN Unknown
Rwandan shaggy rat	D. rwandae Hulselmans, Dierckx, Colyn, Leirs, Verheyen, & Verheyen, 2003	Rwanda (light blue)	Size: About 12 cm (5 in) long, plus about 11 cm (4 in) tail Habitat: Forest, grassland, savanna, shrubland, and inland wetlands Diet: Aquatic plants, as well as insects	NE Unknown
Tanzanian shaggy rat	D. sua Hulselmans, Dierckx, Colyn, Leirs, Verheyen, & Verheyen, 2003	Tanzania (light green)	Size: About 14 cm (6 in) long, plus about 13 cm (5 in) tail Habitat: Forest, grassland, savanna, shrubland, and inland wetlands Diet: Aquatic plants, as well as insects	NE Unknown
West African shaggy rat	D. rufulus Miller, 1900	Western Africa (yellow)	Size: 13–17 cm (5–7 in) long, plus 12–16 cm (5–6 in) tail Habitat: Inland wetlands and grassland Diet: Aquatic plants, as well as insects	LC Unknown

Genus Dephomys – Thomas, 1926 – two species
Common name	Scientific name and subspecies	Range	Size and ecology	IUCN status and estimated population
Defua rat	D. defua (Miller, 1900)	Western Africa	Size: 11–14 cm (4–6 in) long, plus 18–20 cm (7–8 in) tail Habitat: Forest Diet: Fruit and insects	LC Unknown
Ivory Coast rat	D. eburneae (Heim de Balsac & Bellier, 1967)	Western Africa	Size: 12–15 cm (5–6 in) long, plus 18–20 cm (7–8 in) tail Habitat: Forest Diet: Fruit and insects	NE Unknown

Genus Desmomys – Thomas, 1910 – two species
Common name	Scientific name and subspecies	Range	Size and ecology	IUCN status and estimated population
Harrington's rat	D. harringtoni (Thomas, 1902)	Ethiopia	Size: 12–15 cm (5–6 in) long, plus 12–14 cm (5–6 in) tail Habitat: Shrubland and forest Diet: Plant material and invertebrates	LC Unknown
Yalden's rat	D. yaldeni Lavrenchenko, 2003	Ethiopia	Size: 11–14 cm (4–6 in) long, plus 14–15 cm (6 in) tail Habitat: Forest Diet: Plant material and invertebrates	EN Unknown

Genus Diomys – Thomas, 1917 – one species
Common name	Scientific name and subspecies	Range	Size and ecology	IUCN status and estimated population
Crump's mouse	D. crumpi Thomas, 1917	Scattered southern Asia	Size: 10–14 cm (4–6 in) long, plus 10–13 cm (4–5 in) tail Habitat: Forest Diet: Plant material and invertebrates	DD Unknown

Genus Diplothrix – Thomas, 1916 – one species
Common name	Scientific name and subspecies	Range	Size and ecology	IUCN status and estimated population
Ryukyu long-tailed giant rat	D. legata (Thomas, 1906)	Southern islands of Japan	Size: About 23 cm (9 in) long, plus about 25 cm (10 in) tail Habitat: Forest Diet: Plant material and invertebrates	EN Unknown

Genus Echiothrix – Gray, 1867 – two species
Common name	Scientific name and subspecies	Range	Size and ecology	IUCN status and estimated population
Central Sulawesi echiothrix	E. centrosa Miller & Hollister, 1921	Sulawesi island	Size: 18–22 cm (7–9 in) long, plus 23–26 cm (9–10 in) tail Habitat: Forest Diet: Worms	VU Unknown
Northern Sulawesi echiothrix	E. leucura Gray, 1867	Sulawesi island	Size: 19–23 cm (7–9 in) long, plus 21–27 cm (8–11 in) tail Habitat: Forest Diet: Worms	VU Unknown

Genus Eropeplus – Miller & Hollister, 1921 – one species
Common name	Scientific name and subspecies	Range	Size and ecology	IUCN status and estimated population
Sulawesi soft-furred rat	E. canus Miller, 1921	Sulawesi island	Size: 23–25 cm (9–10 in) long, plus 27–30 cm (11–12 in) tail Habitat: Forest Diet: Plant material and invertebrates	LC Unknown

Genus Frateromys – Sody, 1941 – one species
Common name	Scientific name and subspecies	Range	Size and ecology	IUCN status and estimated population
Northeastern peninsula hill rat	F. fratrorum Thomas, 1896	Sulawesi island	Size: 15–19 cm (6–7 in) long, plus 15–20 cm (6–8 in) tail Habitat: Forest Diet: Plant material and invertebrates	LC Unknown

Genus Golunda – Gray, 1837 – one species
Common name	Scientific name and subspecies	Range	Size and ecology	IUCN status and estimated population
Indian bush rat	G. ellioti Gray, 1837	Southern Asia	Size: 9–17 cm (4–7 in) long, plus 7–14 cm (3–6 in) tail Habitat: Shrubland, forest, and grassland Diet: Roots and grass, as well as other vegetation	LC Unknown

Genus Gracilimus – Rowe, Achmadi, & Esselstyn, 2016 – one species
Common name	Scientific name and subspecies	Range	Size and ecology	IUCN status and estimated population
Sulawesi root rat	G. radix Rowe, Achmadi, & Esselstyn, 2016	Sulawesi island	Size: 10–13 cm (4–5 in) long, plus 16–17 cm (6–7 in) tail Habitat: Forest Diet: Plant material and invertebrates	DD Unknown

Genus Grammomys – Thomas, 1915 – eleven species
Common name	Scientific name and subspecies	Range	Size and ecology	IUCN status and estimated population
Arid thicket rat	G. aridulus Thomas & Hinton, 1923	Sudan	Size: 11–12 cm (4–5 in) long, plus 18–19 cm (7 in) tail Habitat: Shrubland Diet: Stems, fruit, nuts, flowers, and other vegetation, as well as insects	DD Unknown
Bunting's thicket rat	G. buntingi (Thomas, 1911)	Western Africa	Size: 10–13 cm (4–5 in) long, plus 16–18 cm (6–7 in) tail Habitat: Forest and shrubland Diet: Stems, fruit, nuts, flowers, and other vegetation, as well as insects	DD Unknown
Eastern rainforest grammomys	G. kuru Thomas & Wroughton, 1907	Central and western Africa	Size: 10–15 cm (4–6 in) long, plus 14–18 cm (6–7 in) tail Habitat: Forest and shrubland Diet: Stems, fruit, nuts, flowers, and other vegetation, as well as insects	LC Unknown
Ethiopian thicket rat	G. minnae Hutterer & Dieterlen, 1984	Ethiopia	Size: About 11 cm (4 in) long, plus about 17 cm (7 in) tail Habitat: Shrubland Diet: Stems, fruit, nuts, flowers, and other vegetation, as well as insects	VU Unknown
Forest thicket rat	G. dryas (Thomas, 1907)	Central Africa	Size: 10–13 cm (4–5 in) long, plus 14–18 cm (6–7 in) tail Habitat: Forest and savanna Diet: Stems, fruit, nuts, flowers, and other vegetation, as well as insects	LC Unknown
Giant thicket rat	G. gigas (Dollman, 1911)	Kenya	Size: 10–13 cm (4–5 in) long, plus 14–18 cm (6–7 in) tail Habitat: Forest and shrubland Diet: Stems, fruit, nuts, flowers, and other vegetation, as well as insects	EN Unknown
Gray-headed thicket rat	G. caniceps Hutterer & Dieterlen, 1984	Kenya and Somalia	Size: 8–11 cm (3–4 in) long, plus 14–16 cm (6 in) tail Habitat: Shrubland Diet: Stems, fruit, nuts, flowers, and other vegetation, as well as insects	DD Unknown
Macmillan's thicket rat	G. macmillani (Wroughton, 1907)	Eastern Africa	Size: 9–11 cm (4 in) long, plus 14–19 cm (6–7 in) tail Habitat: Forest, grassland, and inland wetlands Diet: Stems, fruit, nuts, flowers, and other vegetation, as well as insects	LC Unknown
Mozambique thicket rat	G. cometes (Thomas & Wroughton, 1908)	Southern Africa	Size: 11–13 cm (4–5 in) long, plus 14–20 cm (6–8 in) tail Habitat: Forest and shrubland Diet: Stems, fruit, nuts, flowers, and other vegetation, as well as insects	LC Unknown
Ruwenzori thicket rat	G. ibeanus (Osgood, 1910)	Eastern Africa	Size: 11–13 cm (4–5 in) long, plus 12–22 cm (5–9 in) tail Habitat: Forest and shrubland Diet: Stems, fruit, nuts, flowers, and other vegetation, as well as insects	LC Unknown
Woodland thicket rat	G. dolichurus (Smuts, 1832)	Central and southern Africa	Size: 9–14 cm (4–6 in) long, plus 12–19 cm (5–7 in) tail Habitat: Forest, shrubland, and grassland Diet: Stems, fruit, nuts, flowers, and other vegetation, as well as insects	LC Unknown

Genus Hadromys – Thomas, 1911 – two species
Common name	Scientific name and subspecies	Range	Size and ecology	IUCN status and estimated population
Manipur bush rat	H. humei (Thomas, 1886)	Eastern India	Size: 9–14 cm (4–6 in) long, plus 12–14 cm (5–6 in) tail Habitat: Forest Diet: Grass	EN Unknown
Yunnan bush rat	H. yunnanensis Yang & Wang, 1987	Southern China	Size: 12–14 cm (5–6 in) long, plus 11–14 cm (4–6 in) tail Habitat: Unknown Diet: Grass	DD Unknown

Genus Haeromys – Thomas, 1911 – three species
Common name	Scientific name and subspecies	Range	Size and ecology	IUCN status and estimated population
Lesser ranee mouse	H. pusillus (Thomas, 1893)	Borneo and Philippines	Size: About 7 cm (3 in) long, plus about 12 cm (5 in) tail Habitat: Forest Diet: Seeds	VU Unknown
Minahassa ranee mouse	H. minahassae (Thomas, 1896)	Sulawesi island	Size: 7–8 cm (3–3 in) long, plus 12–14 cm (5–6 in) tail Habitat: Forest Diet: Seeds	NT Unknown
Ranee mouse	H. margarettae (Thomas, 1893)	Borneo	Size: About 8 cm (3 in) long, plus about 14 cm (6 in) tail Habitat: Forest Diet: Seeds	DD Unknown

Genus Halmaheramys – Fabre, Pagès, Musser, Fitriana, Semiadi, & Helgen, 2013 – two species
Common name	Scientific name and subspecies	Range	Size and ecology	IUCN status and estimated population
Spiny Boki Mekot rat	H. bokimekot Fabre, Pagès, Musser, Fitriana, Semiadi, & Helgen, 2013	Halmahera island in Indonesia	Size: 14–17 cm (6–7 in) long, plus 11–14 cm (4–6 in) tail Habitat: Forest Diet: Plant material and invertebrates	DD Unknown
Wallace's large spiny rat	H. wallacei Fabre, Reever, Fitriana, Aplin, & Helgen, 2018	Indonesia	Size: 20–24 cm (8–9 in) long, plus 16–21 cm (6–8 in) tail Habitat: Forest Diet: Plant material and invertebrates	EN Unknown

Genus Hapalomys – Blyth, 1859 – three species
Common name	Scientific name and subspecies	Range	Size and ecology	IUCN status and estimated population
Delacour's marmoset rat	H. delacouri Thomas, 1927	Southeastern Asia	Size: 10–15 cm (4–6 in) long, plus 13–18 cm (5–7 in) tail Habitat: Forest Diet: Bamboo shoots, flowers, and fruit	NT Unknown
Marmoset rat	H. longicaudatus Blyth, 1859	Scattered southeastern Asia	Size: 14–17 cm (6–7 in) long, plus 17–20 cm (7–8 in) tail Habitat: Forest Diet: Bamboo shoots, flowers, and fruit	EN Unknown
Suntsov's marmoset rat	H. suntsovi Abramov, Balakirev, & Rozhnov, 2017	Cambodia and Vietnam	Size: 12–15 cm (5–6 in) long, plus 15–17 cm (6–7 in) tail Habitat: Forest Diet: Bamboo shoots, flowers, and fruit	LC Unknown

Genus Heimyscus – Misonne, 1969 – one species
Common name	Scientific name and subspecies	Range	Size and ecology	IUCN status and estimated population
African smoky mouse	H. fumosus (Brosset, DuBost, & Heim de Balsac, 1965)	West-central Africa	Size: 8–10 cm (3–4 in) long, plus 8–12 cm (3–5 in) tail Habitat: Forest Diet: Plant material and invertebrates	LC Unknown

Genus Hybomys – Thomas, 1910 – six species
Common name	Scientific name and subspecies	Range	Size and ecology	IUCN status and estimated population
Eisentraut's striped mouse	H. badius Osgood, 1936	Cameroon	Size: 10–14 cm (4–6 in) long, plus 10–13 cm (4–5 in) tail Habitat: Forest Diet: Fruit, roots, and insects	EN Unknown
Father Basilio's striped mouse	H. basilii Eisentraut, 1965	Cameroon	Size: 11–16 cm (4–6 in) long, plus 9–14 cm (4–6 in) tail Habitat: Forest Diet: Fruit, roots, and insects	EN Unknown
Miller's striped mouse	H. planifrons (Miller, 1900)	Western Africa	Size: 12–13 cm (5 in) long, plus 9–11 cm (4 in) tail Habitat: Forest Diet: Fruit, roots, and insects	LC Unknown
Moon striped mouse	H. lunaris (Thomas, 1906)	Western Uganda and eastern Democratic Republic of the Congo	Size: About 11 cm (4 in) long, plus about 12 cm (5 in) tail Habitat: Forest Diet: Fruit, roots, and insects	VU Unknown
Peters's striped mouse	H. univittatus (Peters, 1876)	Central Africa	Size: 11–14 cm (4–6 in) long, plus 10–13 cm (4–5 in) tail Habitat: Forest Diet: Fruit, roots, and insects	LC Unknown
Temminck's striped mouse	H. trivirgatus (Temminck, 1853)	Western Africa	Size: 10–13 cm (4–5 in) long, plus 8–11 cm (3–4 in) tail Habitat: Forest Diet: Fruit, roots, and insects	LC Unknown

Genus Hydromys – Geoffroy, 1804 – four species
Common name	Scientific name and subspecies	Range	Size and ecology	IUCN status and estimated population
New Britain water rat	H. neobritannicus Tate & Archbold, 1935	Papua New Guinea	Size: About 29 cm (11 in) long, plus about 29 cm (11 in) tail Habitat: Inland wetlands, unknown, and forest Diet: Fish and aquatic insects, as well as spiders, crustaceans, mussels, frogs, turtles, birds, and bats	DD Unknown
Rakali	H. chrysogaster Geoffroy, 1804	Australia and southeastern Asia	Size: 19–39 cm (7–15 in) long, plus 20–32 cm (8–13 in) tail Habitat: Coastal marine, inland wetlands, forest, and neritic marine Diet: Fish and aquatic insects, as well as spiders, crustaceans, mussels, frogs, turtles, birds, and bats	LC Unknown
Western water rat	H. hussoni Musser & Piik, 1982	Western New Guinea	Size: 12–17 cm (5–7 in) long, plus 10–16 cm (4–6 in) tail Habitat: Inland wetlands, unknown, and forest Diet: Fish and aquatic insects, as well as spiders, crustaceans, mussels, frogs, turtles, birds, and bats	DD Unknown
Ziegler's water rat	H. ziegleri Helgen, 2005	Papua New Guinea	Size: About 13 cm (5 in) long, plus about 12 cm (5 in) tail Habitat: Forest and inland wetlands Diet: Fish and aquatic insects, as well as spiders, crustaceans, mussels, frogs, turtles, birds, and bats	DD Unknown

Genus Hylomyscus – Thomas, 1926 – sixteen species
Common name	Scientific name and subspecies	Range	Size and ecology	IUCN status and estimated population
Albertine Rift wood mouse	H. vulcanorum Lönnberg & Gyldenstolpe, 1925	Central Africa	Size: 8–11 cm (3–4 in) long, plus 11–16 cm (4–6 in) tail Habitat: Forest Diet: Fruit and other vegetation, as well as animals	LC Unknown
Allen's wood mouse	H. alleni (Waterhouse, 1838)	Central and western Africa	Size: 6–10 cm (2–4 in) long, plus 10–16 cm (4–6 in) tail Habitat: Forest Diet: Fruit and other vegetation, as well as animals	LC Unknown
Angolan wood mouse	H. carillus (Thomas, 1904)	Angola	Size: 8–10 cm (3–4 in) long, plus 11–15 cm (4–6 in) tail Habitat: Forest Diet: Fruit and other vegetation, as well as animals	LC Unknown
Ansell's wood mouse	H. anselli Bishop, 1979	Central Africa	Size: 9–11 cm (4 in) long, plus 14–16 cm (6 in) tail Habitat: Forest Diet: Fruit and other vegetation, as well as animals	LC Unknown
Arc Mountain wood mouse	H. arcimontensis Stanley & Carleton, 2005	Tanzania and Malawi	Size: 7–11 cm (3–4 in) long, plus 12–14 cm (5–6 in) tail Habitat: Forest Diet: Fruit and other vegetation, as well as animals	LC Unknown
Baer's wood mouse	H. baeri Heim de Balsac & Aellen, 1965	Western Africa	Size: 9–12 cm (4–5 in) long, plus 11–15 cm (4–6 in) tail Habitat: Forest Diet: Fruit and other vegetation, as well as animals	EN Unknown
Beaded wood mouse	H. aeta (Thomas, 1911)	Central Africa	Size: Unknown Habitat: Forest Diet: Fruit and other vegetation, as well as animals	LC Unknown
Dahomey Gap wood mouse	H. pamfi Nicolas, Olayemi, Wendelen, & Colyn, 2010	Western Africa	Size: 5–11 cm (2–4 in) long, plus 5–13 cm (2–5 in) tail Habitat: Forest Diet: Fruit and other vegetation, as well as animals	DD Unknown
Heinrich's wood mouse	H. heinrichorum Banasiak, Stanley, & Carleton, 2015	Angola	Size: 8–11 cm (3–4 in) long, plus 12–15 cm (5–6 in) tail Habitat: Forest Diet: Fruit and other vegetation, as well as animals	DD Unknown
Kerbis Peterhans's wood mouse	H. kerbispeterhansi Demos, Agwanda, & Hickerson, 2014	Kenya and Uganda	Size: 7–10 cm (3–4 in) long, plus 11–14 cm (4–6 in) tail Habitat: Forest Diet: Fruit and other vegetation, as well as animals	LC Unknown
Little wood mouse	H. parvus Brosset, DuBost, & Heim de Balsac, 1965	Central Africa	Size: 5–8 cm (2–3 in) long, plus 8–13 cm (3–5 in) tail Habitat: Forest Diet: Fruit and other vegetation, as well as animals	LC Unknown
Montane wood mouse	H. denniae (Thomas, 1906)	Western Uganda and eastern Democratic Republic of the Congo	Size: 9–12 cm (4–5 in) long, plus 12–16 cm (5–6 in) tail Habitat: Forest Diet: Fruit and other vegetation, as well as animals	LC Unknown
Mount Kenya wood mouse	H. endorobae (Heller, 1910)	Kenya	Size: 9–12 cm (4–5 in) long, plus 12–18 cm (5–7 in) tail Habitat: Forest Diet: Fruit and other vegetation, as well as animals	LC Unknown
Mount Oku hylomyscus	H. grandis Eisentraut, 1969	Cameroon	Size: 8–11 cm (3–4 in) long, plus 13–15 cm (5–6 in) tail Habitat: Forest Diet: Fruit and other vegetation, as well as animals	EN Unknown
Stella wood mouse	H. stella (Thomas, 1911)	Central Africa	Size: 7–11 cm (3–4 in) long, plus 11–14 cm (4–6 in) tail Habitat: Forest Diet: Fruit and other vegetation, as well as animals	LC Unknown
Walter Verheyen's mouse	H. walterverheyeni (Nicolas, Wendelen, Barriere, Dudu, & Colyn, 2008)	Central Africa	Size: 6–10 cm (2–4 in) long, plus 10–16 cm (4–6 in) tail Habitat: Forest Diet: Fruit and other vegetation, as well as animals	LC Unknown

Genus Hyomys – Thomas, 1904 – two species
Common name	Scientific name and subspecies	Range	Size and ecology	IUCN status and estimated population
Eastern white-eared giant rat	H. goliath (A. Milne-Edwards, 1900)	Papua New Guinea	Size: 36–39 cm (14–15 in) long, plus 30–38 cm (12–15 in) tail Habitat: Forest Diet: Shoots as well as other vegetation	LC Unknown
Western white-eared giant rat	H. dammermani Stein, 1933	New Guinea	Size: 29–32 cm (11–13 in) long, plus 24–32 cm (9–13 in) tail Habitat: Forest Diet: Shoots as well as other vegetation	DD Unknown

Genus Hyorhinomys – Esselstyn, Achmadi, Handika, & Rowe, 2015 – one species
Common name	Scientific name and subspecies	Range	Size and ecology	IUCN status and estimated population
Hog-nosed shrew rat	H. stuempkei Esselstyn, Achmadi, Handika, & Rowe, 2015	Sulawesi	Size: 11–13 cm (4–5 in) long, plus 8–10 cm (3–4 in) tail Habitat: Forest Diet: Plant material and invertebrates	DD Unknown

Genus Kadarsanomys – Musser, 1981 – one species
Common name	Scientific name and subspecies	Range	Size and ecology	IUCN status and estimated population
Sody's tree rat	K. sodyi (Bartels, 1937)	Java island in Indonesia	Size: 16–21 cm (6–8 in) long, plus 25–30 cm (10–12 in) tail Habitat: Forest Diet: Plant material and invertebrates	EN Unknown

Genus Komodomys – Musser & Boeadi, 1980 – one species
Common name	Scientific name and subspecies	Range	Size and ecology	IUCN status and estimated population
Komodo rat	K. rintjanus (Sody, 1941)	Java island	Size: 12–18 cm (5–7 in) long, plus 12–17 cm (5–7 in) tail Habitat: Shrubland and forest Diet: Plant material and invertebrates	VU Unknown

Genus Lamottemys – Petter, 1986 – one species
Common name	Scientific name and subspecies	Range	Size and ecology	IUCN status and estimated population
Mount Oku rat	L. okuensis Petter, 1986	Cameroon	Size: 13–15 cm (5–6 in) long, plus 12–14 cm (5–6 in) tail Habitat: Forest Diet: Plant material and invertebrates	EN Unknown

Genus Leggadina – Thomas, 1910 – two species
Common name	Scientific name and subspecies	Range	Size and ecology	IUCN status and estimated population
Forrest's mouse	L. forresti (Thomas, 1906)	Central Australia	Size: 7–10 cm (3–4 in) long, plus 5–7 cm (2–3 in) tail Habitat: Shrubland and desert Diet: Seeds and vegetation	LC Unknown
Lakeland Downs mouse	L. lakedownensis Watts, 1976	Northern Australia	Size: 5–10 cm (2–4 in) long, plus 4–8 cm (2–3 in) tail Habitat: Shrubland, savanna, and grassland Diet: Seeds and vegetation	LC Unknown

Genus Lemniscomys – Trouessart, 1881 – eleven species
Common name	Scientific name and subspecies	Range	Size and ecology	IUCN status and estimated population
Barbary striped grass mouse	L. barbarus (Linnaeus, 1766)	Northern Africa	Size: 10–13 cm (4–5 in) long, plus 11–15 cm (4–6 in) tail Habitat: Shrubland Diet: Grass, seeds, grains, and insects	LC Unknown
Bellier's striped grass mouse	L. bellieri Van der Straeten, 1975	Western Africa	Size: 9–13 cm (4–5 in) long, plus 9–14 cm (4–6 in) tail Habitat: Savanna Diet: Grass, seeds, grains, and insects	LC Unknown
Buffoon striped grass mouse	L. macculus (Thomas & Wroughton, 1910)	East-central Africa	Size: 8–12 cm (3–5 in) long, plus 7–15 cm (3–6 in) tail Habitat: Grassland and savanna Diet: Grass, seeds, grains, and insects	LC Unknown
Griselda's striped grass mouse	L. griselda (Thomas, 1904)	South-central Africa	Size: 11–14 cm (4–6 in) long, plus 11–15 cm (4–6 in) tail Habitat: Savanna Diet: Grass, seeds, grains, and insects	LC Unknown
Heuglin's striped grass mouse	L. zebra (Heuglin, 1864)	Northern Sub-Saharan Africa	Size: 9–12 cm (4–5 in) long, plus 11–14 cm (4–6 in) tail Habitat: Savanna, shrubland, and grassland Diet: Grass, seeds, grains, and insects	LC Unknown
Hoogstraal's striped grass mouse	L. hoogstraali Dieterlen, 1991	Northern South Sudan	Size: About 13 cm (5 in) long, plus about 13 cm (5 in) tail Habitat: Savanna Diet: Grass, seeds, grains, and insects	DD Unknown
Mittendorf's striped grass mouse	L. mittendorfi Eisentraut, 1968	Cameroon	Size: 8–10 cm (3–4 in) long, plus 7–9 cm (3–4 in) tail Habitat: Grassland Diet: Grass, seeds, grains, and insects	LC Unknown
Rosevear's striped grass mouse	L. roseveari Van der Straeten, 1980	Zambia	Size: 11–14 cm (4–6 in) long, plus 12–16 cm (5–6 in) tail Habitat: Forest Diet: Grass, seeds, grains, and insects	DD Unknown
Senegal one-striped grass mouse	L. linulus (Thomas, 1910)	Western Africa	Size: 9–13 cm (4–5 in) long, plus 9–14 cm (4–6 in) tail Habitat: Savanna Diet: Grass, seeds, grains, and insects	LC Unknown
Single-striped grass mouse	L. rosalia (Thomas, 1904)	Sub-Saharan Africa	Size: 9–17 cm (4–7 in) long, plus 8–16 cm (3–6 in) tail Habitat: Savanna Diet: Grass, seeds, grains, and insects	LC Unknown
Typical striped grass mouse	L. striatus (Linnaeus, 1758)	Northern Sub-Saharan Africa	Size: 9–14 cm (4–6 in) long, plus 9–16 cm (4–6 in) tail Habitat: Shrubland, savanna, forest, and grassland Diet: Grass, seeds, grains, and insects	LC Unknown

Genus Lenomys – Thomas, 1898 – one species
Common name	Scientific name and subspecies	Range	Size and ecology	IUCN status and estimated population
Trefoil-toothed giant rat	L. meyeri (Jentink, 1879)	Sulawesi island	Size: 23–30 cm (9–12 in) long, plus 24–30 cm (9–12 in) tail Habitat: Forest Diet: Plant material and invertebrates	LC Unknown

Genus Lenothrix – Miller, 1903 – one species
Common name	Scientific name and subspecies	Range	Size and ecology	IUCN status and estimated population
Gray tree rat	L. canus Miller, 1903	Malaysia and Brunei	Size: 14–21 cm (6–8 in) long, plus 19–29 cm (7–11 in) tail Habitat: Forest Diet: Plant material and invertebrates	LC Unknown

Genus Leopoldamys – Ellerman, 1947 – seven species
Common name	Scientific name and subspecies	Range	Size and ecology	IUCN status and estimated population
Diwangkara's long-tailed giant rat	L. diwangkarai Maryanto & Sinaga, 2008	Indonesia	Size: 19–22 cm (7–9 in) long, plus 29–32 cm (11–13 in) tail Habitat: Forest Diet: Insects, other invertebrates, and a wide variety of vegetation	LC Unknown
Edwards's long-tailed giant rat	L. edwardsi (Thomas, 1882)	Southeastern Asia	Size: 21–29 cm (8–11 in) long, plus 26–31 cm (10–12 in) tail Habitat: Forest Diet: Insects, other invertebrates, and a wide variety of vegetation	LC Unknown
Long-tailed giant rat	L. sabanus (Thomas, 1887)	Southeastern Asia	Size: 20–27 cm (8–11 in) long, plus 27–41 cm (11–16 in) tail Habitat: Forest Diet: Insects, other invertebrates, and a wide variety of vegetation	LC Unknown
Mentawai long-tailed giant rat	L. siporanus (Thomas, 1895)	Indonesia	Size: 17–29 cm (7–11 in) long, plus 22–33 cm (9–13 in) tail Habitat: Forest Diet: Insects, other invertebrates, and a wide variety of vegetation	VU Unknown
Millet's leopoldamys	L. milleti Robinson & Kloss, 1922	Vietnam	Size: 21–28 cm (8–11 in) long, plus 29–36 cm (11–14 in) tail Habitat: Forest Diet: Insects, other invertebrates, and a wide variety of vegetation	LC Unknown
Neill's long-tailed giant rat	L. neilli (Marshall, 1976)	Southeastern Asia	Size: 20–23 cm (8–9 in) long, plus 24–30 cm (9–12 in) tail Habitat: Forest Diet: Insects, other invertebrates, and a wide variety of vegetation	LC Unknown
Sundaic mountain leopoldamys	L. ciliatus (Bonhote, 1900)	Malaysia and Indonesia	Size: 21–25 cm (8–10 in) long, plus 30–39 cm (12–15 in) tail Habitat: Forest Diet: Insects, other invertebrates, and a wide variety of vegetation	LC Unknown

Genus Leporillus – Thomas, 1906 – two species
Common name	Scientific name and subspecies	Range	Size and ecology	IUCN status and estimated population
Greater stick-nest rat	L. conditor (Sturt, 1848)	Scattered southern and western Australia	Size: 17–26 cm (7–10 in) long, plus 14–18 cm (6–7 in) tail Habitat: Grassland, desert, shrubland, and rocky areas Diet: Succulents and other vegetation	NT 2,800–3,600
Lesser stick-nest rat †	L. apicalis (Gould, 1853)	Western Australia	Size: Unknown Habitat: Caves, desert, shrubland, grassland, savanna, and rocky areas Diet: Succulents and other vegetation	EX 0

Genus Leptomys – Thomas, 1897 – five species
Common name	Scientific name and subspecies	Range	Size and ecology	IUCN status and estimated population
Arfak water rat	L. arfakensis Musser, Helgen, & Lunde, 2008	Western New Guinea	Size: 13–16 cm (5–6 in) long, plus about 15 cm (6 in) tail Habitat: Forest Diet: Insects and small animals	DD Unknown
Ernst Mayr's water rat	L. ernstmayri Rümmler, 1938	New Guinea	Size: 12–16 cm (5–6 in) long, plus 13–18 cm (5–7 in) tail Habitat: Forest Diet: Insects and small animals	LC Unknown
Fly River water rat	L. signatus Tate & Archbold, 1938	Papua New Guinea	Size: 14–16 cm (6 in) long, plus 14–16 cm (6 in) tail Habitat: Forest and unknown Diet: Insects and small animals	LC Unknown
Long-footed water rat	L. elegans Thomas, 1897	Papua New Guinea	Size: 14–20 cm (6–8 in) long, plus 12–17 cm (5–7 in) tail Habitat: Forest Diet: Insects and small animals	LC Unknown
Small water rat	L. paulus Musser, Helgen, & Lunde, 2008	Papua New Guinea	Size: 11–14 cm (4–6 in) long, plus 13–17 cm (5–7 in) tail Habitat: Forest Diet: Insects and small animals	DD Unknown

Genus Limnomys – Mearns, 1905 – two species
Common name	Scientific name and subspecies	Range	Size and ecology	IUCN status and estimated population
Gray-bellied mountain rat	L. bryophilus Rickart, Heaney, & Tabaranza, 2003	Mindanao island	Size: 12–14 cm (5–6 in) long, plus 15–19 cm (6–7 in) tail Habitat: Forest Diet: Plant material and invertebrates	LC Unknown
Mindanao mountain rat	L. sibuanus Mearns, 1905	Mindanao island	Size: 11–15 cm (4–6 in) long, plus 14–18 cm (6–7 in) tail Habitat: Forest Diet: Plant material and invertebrates	LC Unknown

Genus Lorentzimys – Jentink, 1911 – one species
Common name	Scientific name and subspecies	Range	Size and ecology	IUCN status and estimated population
New Guinean jumping mouse	L. nouhuysi Jentink, 1911	New Guinea	Size: 5–9 cm (2–4 in) long, plus 11–13 cm (4–5 in) tail Habitat: Forest Diet: Insects, vegetation, and fungi	LC Unknown

Genus Macruromys – Stein, 1933 – two species
Common name	Scientific name and subspecies	Range	Size and ecology	IUCN status and estimated population
Eastern small-toothed rat	M. major Rümmler, 1935	New Guinea	Size: 22–26 cm (9–10 in) long, plus 31–34 cm (12–13 in) tail Habitat: Forest Diet: Vegetation	LC Unknown
Lesser small-toothed rat	M. elegans Stein, 1933	Western New Guinea	Size: 15–16 cm (6 in) long, plus 21–22 cm (8–9 in) tail Habitat: Forest and unknown Diet: Vegetation	DD Unknown

Genus Madromys – Sody, 1941 – one species
Common name	Scientific name and subspecies	Range	Size and ecology	IUCN status and estimated population
Blanford's rat	M. blanfordi (Thomas, 1881)	Southern Asia	Size: 15–19 cm (6–7 in) long, plus 18–21 cm (7–8 in) tail Habitat: Caves, forest, and shrubland Diet: Plant material and invertebrates	LC Unknown

Genus Malacomys – A. Milne-Edwards, 1877 – three species
Common name	Scientific name and subspecies	Range	Size and ecology	IUCN status and estimated population
Big-eared swamp rat	M. longipes H. Milne-Edwards, 1877	Central Africa	Size: 13–18 cm (5–7 in) long, plus 17–20 cm (7–8 in) tail Habitat: Inland wetlands and forest Diet: Fruit, seeds, nuts, roots, insects, slugs, snails, and crabs	LC Unknown
Cansdale's swamp rat	M. cansdalei Ansell, 1958	Western Africa	Size: 13–17 cm (5–7 in) long, plus 17–21 cm (7–8 in) tail Habitat: Forest Diet: Fruit, seeds, nuts, roots, insects, slugs, snails, and crabs	LC Unknown
Edward's swamp rat	M. edwardsi Rochebrune, 1885	Western Africa	Size: 12–16 cm (5–6 in) long, plus 15–18 cm (6–7 in) tail Habitat: Forest and shrubland Diet: Fruit, seeds, nuts, roots, insects, slugs, snails, and crabs	LC Unknown

Genus Mallomys – Thomas, 1898 – four species
Common name	Scientific name and subspecies	Range	Size and ecology	IUCN status and estimated population
Alpine woolly rat	M. gunung Flannery, Aplin, & Groves, 1989	Western New Guinea	Size: 41–47 cm (16–19 in) long, plus 35–37 cm (14–15 in) tail Habitat: Rocky areas and grassland Diet: Shoots as well as other vegetation	EN Unknown
De Vis's woolly rat	M. aroaensis (De Vis, 1907)	Papua New Guinea	Size: 34–41 cm (13–16 in) long, plus 33–43 cm (13–17 in) tail Habitat: Forest Diet: Shoots as well as other vegetation	LC Unknown
Rothschild's woolly rat	M. rothschildi Thomas, 1898	New Guinea	Size: 34–40 cm (13–16 in) long, plus 34–42 cm (13–17 in) tail Habitat: Caves and forest Diet: Shoots as well as other vegetation	LC Unknown
Subalpine woolly rat	M. istapantap Flannery, Aplin, & Groves, 1989	New Guinea	Size: 40–43 cm (16–17 in) long, plus 28–37 cm (11–15 in) tail Habitat: Grassland, shrubland, and forest Diet: Shoots as well as other vegetation	LC Unknown

Genus Mammelomys – Menzies, 1996 – two species
Common name	Scientific name and subspecies	Range	Size and ecology	IUCN status and estimated population
Large mosaic-tailed rat	M. rattoides (Thomas, 1922)	New Guinea	Size: 15–22 cm (6–9 in) long, plus 13–15 cm (5–6 in) tail Habitat: Forest Diet: Plant material and invertebrates	LC Unknown
Large-scaled mosaic-tailed rat	M. lanosus (Thomas, 1922)	New Guinea	Size: 13–18 cm (5–7 in) long, plus 10–15 cm (4–6 in) tail Habitat: Forest Diet: Plant material and invertebrates	LC Unknown

Genus Margaretamys – Musser, 1981 – four species
Common name	Scientific name and subspecies	Range	Size and ecology	IUCN status and estimated population
Beccari's margareta rat	M. beccarii (Jentink, 1880)	Sulawesi island	Size: 11–15 cm (4–6 in) long, plus 15–21 cm (6–8 in) tail Habitat: Forest Diet: Plant material and invertebrates	LC Unknown
Christine's margareta rat	M. christinae Mortelliti, Castiglia, Amori, Maryanto, & Musser, 2012	Sulawesi island	Size: About 11 cm (4 in) long, plus about 18 cm (7 in) tail Habitat: Forest Diet: Plant material and invertebrates	VU Unknown
Elegant margareta rat	M. elegans Musser, 1981	Sulawesi island	Size: 16–20 cm (6–8 in) long, plus 22–29 cm (9–11 in) tail Habitat: Forest Diet: Plant material and invertebrates	VU Unknown
Little margareta rat	M. parvus Musser, 1981	Sulawesi island	Size: 9–12 cm (4–5 in) long, plus 15–19 cm (6–7 in) tail Habitat: Forest Diet: Plant material and invertebrates	DD Unknown

Genus Mastacomys – Thomas, 1882 – one species
Common name	Scientific name and subspecies	Range	Size and ecology	IUCN status and estimated population
Broad-toothed mouse	M. fuscus Thomas, 1882	Southeastern Australia	Size: 14–20 cm (6–8 in) long, plus 10–14 cm (4–6 in) tail Habitat: Forest, shrubland, grassland, and inland wetlands Diet: Plant material and invertebrates	NT 20,000–100,000

Genus Mastomys – Thomas, 1915 – eight species
Common name	Scientific name and subspecies	Range	Size and ecology	IUCN status and estimated population
Awash multimammate mouse	M. awashensis Lavrenchenko, Likhnova, & Baskevich, 1998	Ethiopia	Size: 11–13 cm (4–5 in) long, plus 11–13 cm (4–5 in) tail Habitat: Savanna Diet: Grass, seeds, and insects	LC Unknown
Dwarf multimammate mouse	M. pernanus (Kershaw, 1921)	East-central Africa	Size: 7–9 cm (3–4 in) long, plus 6–8 cm (2–3 in) tail Habitat: Savanna Diet: Grass, seeds, and insects	DD Unknown
Guinea multimammate mouse	M. erythroleucus (Temminck, 1853)	Morocco and northern Sub-Saharan Africa	Size: 9–18 cm (4–7 in) long, plus 8–16 cm (3–6 in) tail Habitat: Shrubland, savanna, and forest Diet: Grass, seeds, and insects	LC Unknown
Hubert's multimammate mouse	M. huberti (Wroughton, 1909)	Western Africa	Size: 7–15 cm (3–6 in) long, plus 6–12 cm (2–5 in) tail Habitat: Grassland and savanna Diet: Grass, seeds, and insects	LC Unknown
Natal multimammate mouse	M. natalensis Smith, 1834	Sub-Saharan Africa	Size: 7–16 cm (3–6 in) long, plus 7–18 cm (3–7 in) tail Habitat: Shrubland and savanna Diet: Grass, seeds, and insects	LC Unknown
Shortridge's multimammate mouse	M. shortridgei (St. Leger, 1933)	Southwestern Africa	Size: 10–14 cm (4–6 in) long, plus 8–12 cm (3–5 in) tail Habitat: Savanna, grassland, and inland wetlands Diet: Grass, seeds, and insects	LC Unknown
Southern multimammate mouse	M. coucha (Smith, 1834)	Southern Africa	Size: 8–12 cm (3–5 in) long, plus 7–11 cm (3–4 in) tail Habitat: Shrubland and savanna Diet: Grass, seeds, and insects	LC Unknown
Verheyen's multimammate mouse	M. kollmannspergeri (Petter, 1957)	North-central Africa	Size: 11–17 cm (4–7 in) long, plus 9–14 cm (4–6 in) tail Habitat: Inland wetlands and savanna Diet: Grass, seeds, and insects	LC Unknown

Genus Maxomys – Sody, 1936 – eighteen species
Common name	Scientific name and subspecies	Range	Size and ecology	IUCN status and estimated population
Bartels's spiny rat	M. bartelsii (Jentink, 1910)	Java island	Size: 12–18 cm (5–7 in) long, plus 11–17 cm (4–7 in) tail Habitat: Forest Diet: Roots, fruit, and other vegetation, as well as invertebrates and small vertebrates	LC Unknown
Chestnut-bellied spiny rat	M. ochraceiventer (Thomas, 1894)	Borneo	Size: 14–18 cm (6–7 in) long, plus 13–18 cm (5–7 in) tail Habitat: Forest Diet: Roots, fruit, and other vegetation, as well as invertebrates and small vertebrates	DD Unknown
Dollman's spiny rat	M. dollmani (Ellerman, 1941)	Sulawesi island	Size: 14–21 cm (6–8 in) long, plus 18–26 cm (7–10 in) tail Habitat: Forest Diet: Roots, fruit, and other vegetation, as well as invertebrates and small vertebrates	LC Unknown
Fat-nosed spiny rat	M. inflatus (Kloss, 1916)	Sumatra island in Indonesia	Size: 16–20 cm (6–8 in) long, plus 14–19 cm (6–7 in) tail Habitat: Forest Diet: Roots, fruit, and other vegetation, as well as invertebrates and small vertebrates	VU Unknown
Hellwald's spiny rat	M. hellwaldii (Jentink, 1878)	Sulawesi island	Size: 18–22 cm (7–9 in) long, plus 16–20 cm (6–8 in) tail Habitat: Forest Diet: Roots, fruit, and other vegetation, as well as invertebrates and small vertebrates	LC Unknown
Malayan mountain spiny rat	M. inas (Bonhote, 1906)	Malaysia	Size: 12–17 cm (5–7 in) long, plus 13–17 cm (5–7 in) tail Habitat: Forest Diet: Roots, fruit, and other vegetation, as well as invertebrates and small vertebrates	LC Unknown
Mo's spiny rat	M. moi (Kloss, 1922)	Vietnam and Laos	Size: 14–21 cm (6–8 in) long, plus 15–20 cm (6–8 in) tail Habitat: Shrubland and forest Diet: Roots, fruit, and other vegetation, as well as invertebrates and small vertebrates	LC Unknown
Mountain spiny rat	M. alticola (Thomas, 1888)	Malaysia	Size: 13–18 cm (5–7 in) long, plus 12–18 cm (5–7 in) tail Habitat: Forest Diet: Roots, fruit, and other vegetation, as well as invertebrates and small vertebrates	LC Unknown
Musschenbroek's spiny rat	M. musschenbroekii (Jentink, 1878)	Indonesia	Size: 11–17 cm (4–7 in) long, plus 11–16 cm (4–6 in) tail Habitat: Forest and shrubland Diet: Roots, fruit, and other vegetation, as well as invertebrates and small vertebrates	LC Unknown
Pagai spiny rat	M. pagensis (Miller, 1903)	Indonesia	Size: 17–22 cm (7–9 in) long, plus 16–20 cm (6–8 in) tail Habitat: Forest Diet: Roots, fruit, and other vegetation, as well as invertebrates and small vertebrates	VU Unknown
Palawan spiny rat	M. panglima (Robinson, 1921)	Philippines	Size: 16–22 cm (6–9 in) long, plus 18–23 cm (7–9 in) tail Habitat: Forest Diet: Roots, fruit, and other vegetation, as well as invertebrates and small vertebrates	LC Unknown
Rajah spiny rat	M. rajah (Thomas, 1894)	Southeastern Asia	Size: 16–23 cm (6–9 in) long, plus 16–21 cm (6–8 in) tail Habitat: Forest Diet: Roots, fruit, and other vegetation, as well as invertebrates and small vertebrates	VU Unknown
Red spiny rat	M. surifer (Miller, 1900)	Southeastern Asia	Size: 15–23 cm (6–9 in) long, plus 14–23 cm (6–9 in) tail Habitat: Forest Diet: Roots, fruit, and other vegetation, as well as invertebrates and small vertebrates	LC Unknown
Small Bornean maxomys	M. baeodon (Thomas, 1894)	Indonesia	Size: 12–14 cm (5–6 in) long, plus 11–14 cm (4–6 in) tail Habitat: Forest Diet: Roots, fruit, and other vegetation, as well as invertebrates and small vertebrates	DD Unknown
Sumatran spiny rat	M. hylomyoides (Robinson & Kloss, 1916)	Borneo	Size: 11–14 cm (4–6 in) long, plus 9–14 cm (4–6 in) tail Habitat: Forest and shrubland Diet: Roots, fruit, and other vegetation, as well as invertebrates and small vertebrates	DD Unknown
Tajuddin's spiny rat	M. tajuddinii Achmadi, Maryanto, & Maharadatunkamsi, 2012	Southeastern Asia	Size: 9–13 cm (4–5 in) long, plus 10–13 cm (4–5 in) tail Habitat: Forest Diet: Roots, fruit, and other vegetation, as well as invertebrates and small vertebrates	LC Unknown
Watts's spiny rat	M. wattsi Musser, 1991	Sulawesi island	Size: 16–19 cm (6–7 in) long, plus 12–16 cm (5–6 in) tail Habitat: Forest Diet: Roots, fruit, and other vegetation, as well as invertebrates and small vertebrates	VU Unknown
Whitehead's spiny rat	M. whiteheadi (Thomas, 1894)	Southeastern Asia	Size: 10–13 cm (4–5 in) long, plus 8–11 cm (3–4 in) tail Habitat: Forest Diet: Roots, fruit, and other vegetation, as well as invertebrates and small vertebrates	VU Unknown

Genus Melasmothrix – Miller & Hollister, 1921 – one species
Common name	Scientific name and subspecies	Range	Size and ecology	IUCN status and estimated population
Sulawesian shrew rat	M. naso Miller & Hollister, 1921	Sulawesi island	Size: 11–13 cm (4–5 in) long, plus 8–10 cm (3–4 in) tail Habitat: Forest Diet: Worms and insect larvae	NT Unknown

Genus Melomys – Thomas, 1922 – 22 species
Common name	Scientific name and subspecies	Range	Size and ecology	IUCN status and estimated population
Bannister's rat	M. bannisteri Kitchener & Maryanto, 1993	Kai Besar island in Indonesia	Size: About 14 cm (6 in) long, plus about 13 cm (5 in) tail Habitat: Forest and unknown Diet: Fruit, berries, and other vegetation	EN Unknown
Black-tailed mosaic-tailed rat	M. rufescens (Alston, 1877)	New Guinea and nearby islands	Size: 11–15 cm (4–6 in) long, plus 10–18 cm (4–7 in) tail Habitat: Forest Diet: Fruit, berries, and other vegetation	LC Unknown
Bougainville mosaic-tailed rat	M. bougainville Troughton, 1936	Papua New Guinea and Solomon Islands	Size: 14–17 cm (6–7 in) long, plus 9–14 cm (4–6 in) tail Habitat: Unknown Diet: Fruit, berries, and other vegetation	DD Unknown
Bramble Cay melomys †	M. rubicola Thomas, 1924	Bramble Cay in Australia	Size: Unknown Habitat: Shrubland Diet: Fruit, berries, and other vegetation	EX 0
Cape York melomys	M. capensis Tate, 1951	Northern Australia	Size: 11–17 cm (4–7 in) long, plus 12–18 cm (5–7 in) tail Habitat: Forest Diet: Fruit, berries, and other vegetation	LC Unknown
Dollman's melomys	M. dollmani Rümmler, 1935	Papua New Guinea	Size: Unknown Habitat: Forest Diet: Fruit, berries, and other vegetation	LC Unknown
Dusky mosaic-tailed rat	M. aerosus (Thomas, 1920)	Seram Island in Indonesia	Size: 15–16 cm (6 in) long, plus 12–14 cm (5–6 in) tail Habitat: Forest Diet: Fruit, berries, and other vegetation	EN Unknown
Fawn-footed mosaic-tailed rat	M. cervinipes (Gould, 1852)	Eastern Australia	Size: 9–20 cm (4–8 in) long, plus 10–18 cm (4–7 in) tail Habitat: Forest Diet: Fruit, berries, and other vegetation	LC Unknown
Grassland mosaic-tailed rat	M. burtoni (Ramsay, 1887)	Northern and eastern Australia and New Guinea	Size: 12–14 cm (5–6 in) long, plus 10–14 cm (4–6 in) tail Habitat: Grassland, forest, savanna, and inland wetlands Diet: Fruit, berries, and other vegetation	LC Unknown
Long-tailed Talaud mosaic-tailed rat	M. talaudium Thomas, 1921	Philippines	Size: 17–18 cm (7 in) long, plus 15–19 cm (6–7 in) tail Habitat: Forest Diet: Fruit, berries, and other vegetation	EN Unknown
Manus Island mosaic-tailed rat	M. matambuai Flannery, Colgan, & Trimble, 1994	Manus Island in Papua New Guinea	Size: About 15 cm (6 in) long, plus about 14 cm (6 in) tail Habitat: Forest Diet: Fruit, berries, and other vegetation	EN Unknown
Manusela mosaic-tailed rat	M. fraterculus (Thomas, 1920)	Seram Island in Indonesia	Size: About 12 cm (5 in) long, plus 15–16 cm (6 in) tail Habitat: Forest Diet: Fruit, berries, and other vegetation	EN Unknown
Obi mosaic-tailed rat	M. obiensis (Thomas, 1911)	Indonesia	Size: 12–13 cm (5 in) long, plus 14–18 cm (6–7 in) tail Habitat: Forest Diet: Fruit, berries, and other vegetation	LC Unknown
Papua grassland mosaic-tailed rat	M. lutillus (Thomas, 1913)	New Guinea	Size: 9–12 cm (4–5 in) long, plus 11–12 cm (4–5 in) tail Habitat: Grassland and savanna Diet: Fruit, berries, and other vegetation	LC Unknown
Pavel's Seram mosaic-tailed rat	M. paveli Helgen, 2003	Seram Island in Indonesia	Size: About 12 cm (5 in) long, plus about 13 cm (5 in) tail Habitat: Forest Diet: Fruit, berries, and other vegetation	DD Unknown
Riama mosaic-tailed rat	M. howi Kitchener, 1996	Riama Island in Indonesia	Size: 11–12 cm (4–5 in) long, plus 13–14 cm (5–6 in) tail Habitat: Forest Diet: Fruit, berries, and other vegetation	DD Unknown
Rossel Island melomys	M. arcium Thomas, 1913	Rossel Island in Papua New Guinea	Size: About 14 cm (6 in) long, plus about 13 cm (5 in) tail Habitat: Unknown Diet: Fruit, berries, and other vegetation	DD Unknown
Seram long-tailed mosaic-tailed rat	M. fulgens (Thomas, 1920)	Seram Island in Indonesia	Size: About 15 cm (6 in) long, plus about 20–21 cm (8 in) tail Habitat: Forest Diet: Fruit, berries, and other vegetation	VU Unknown
Short-tailed Talaud mosaic-tailed rat	M. caurinus Thomas, 1921	Philippines	Size: About 18 cm (7 in) long, plus 13–14 cm (5–6 in) tail Habitat: Forest Diet: Fruit, berries, and other vegetation	EN Unknown
Snow Mountains grassland mosaic-tailed rat	M. frigicola (Tate, 1951)	Western New Guinea	Size: 10–14 cm (4–6 in) long, plus 12–14 cm (5–6 in) tail Habitat: Grassland Diet: Fruit, berries, and other vegetation	LC Unknown
White-bellied mosaic-tailed rat	M. leucogaster (Jentink, 1908)	New Guinea	Size: About 21 cm (8 in) long, plus tail Habitat: Forest Diet: Fruit, berries, and other vegetation	LC Unknown
Yamdena mosaic-tailed rat	M. cooperae Kitchener, 1995	Yamdena island in Indonesia	Size: 11–14 cm (4–6 in) long, plus 14–17 cm (6–7 in) tail Habitat: Forest Diet: Fruit, berries, and other vegetation	DD Unknown

Genus Mesembriomys – Palmer, 1906 – two species
Common name	Scientific name and subspecies	Range	Size and ecology	IUCN status and estimated population
Black-footed tree-rat	M. gouldii (Gray, 1843)	Northern Australia	Size: 25–30 cm (10–12 in) long, plus 32–41 cm (13–16 in) tail Habitat: Forest and savanna Diet: Seeds, nuts, and insects	VU 30,000
Golden-backed tree-rat	M. macrurus (Peters, 1876)	Northwestern Australia	Size: 18–24 cm (7–9 in) long, plus 29–36 cm (11–14 in) tail Habitat: Forest Diet: Seeds, nuts, and insects	NT Unknown

Genus Micaelamys – Ellerman, 1941 – two species
Common name	Scientific name and subspecies	Range	Size and ecology	IUCN status and estimated population
Grant's rock mouse	M. granti (Wroughton, 1908)	South Africa	Size: 9–13 cm (4–5 in) long, plus 9–14 cm (4–6 in) tail Habitat: Rocky areas and shrubland Diet: Grain, seeds, roots, nuts, and fruit	LC Unknown
Namaqua rock rat	M. namaquensis (A. Smith, 1834)	Southern Africa	Size: 8–15 cm (3–6 in) long, plus 10–20 cm (4–8 in) tail Habitat: Desert, rocky areas, forest, grassland, shrubland, and savanna Diet: Grain, seeds, roots, nuts, and fruit	LC Unknown

Genus Microhydromys – Tate & Archbold, 1941 – two species
Common name	Scientific name and subspecies	Range	Size and ecology	IUCN status and estimated population
Northern groove-toothed shrew mouse	M. richardsoni Tate & Archbold, 1941	New Guinea	Size: 7–9 cm (3–4 in) long, plus 8–10 cm (3–4 in) tail Habitat: Forest and savanna Diet: Insects	DD Unknown
Southern groove-toothed moss mouse	M. argenteus Helgen, Leary, & Aplin, 2010	Papua New Guinea	Size: 7–9 cm (3–4 in) long, plus 7–9 cm (3–4 in) tail Habitat: Forest Diet: Insects	DD Unknown

Genus Micromys – Dehne, 1841 – one species
Common name	Scientific name and subspecies	Range	Size and ecology	IUCN status and estimated population
Eurasian harvest mouse	M. minutus (Pallas, 1771)	Europe and Asia	Size: 4–8 cm (2–3 in) long, plus 3–8 cm (1–3 in) tail Habitat: Forest and inland wetlands Diet: Seeds, vegetation, and insects, as well as bird eggs	LC Unknown

Genus Millardia – Thomas, 1911 – four species
Common name	Scientific name and subspecies	Range	Size and ecology	IUCN status and estimated population
Kondana rat	M. kondana Mishra & Dhanda, 1975	Southwestern India	Size: 15–20 cm (6–8 in) long, plus 11–19 cm (4–7 in) tail Habitat: Shrubland, forest, and rocky areas Diet: Grain, seeds, and swamp vegetation	EN Unknown
Miss Ryley's soft-furred rat	M. kathleenae Thomas, 1914	Myanmar	Size: 13–17 cm (5–7 in) long, plus 12–16 cm (5–6 in) tail Habitat: Shrubland Diet: Grain, seeds, and swamp vegetation	LC Unknown
Sand-colored soft-furred rat	M. gleadowi (Murray, 1886)	Pakistan and western India	Size: 7–10 cm (3–4 in) long, plus 6–10 cm (2–4 in) tail Habitat: Desert, shrubland, and grassland Diet: Grain, seeds, and swamp vegetation	LC Unknown
Soft-furred rat	M. meltada (Gray, 1837)	Southern Asia	Size: 10–16 cm (4–6 in) long, plus 9–14 cm (4–6 in) tail Habitat: Grassland, forest, and shrubland Diet: Grain, seeds, and swamp vegetation	LC Unknown

Genus Mirzamys – Helgen & Helgen, 2009 – two species
Common name	Scientific name and subspecies	Range	Size and ecology	IUCN status and estimated population
Mirza's eastern moss rat	M. norahae Helgen & Helgen, 2009	New Guinea	Size: 10–12 cm (4–5 in) long, plus 8–10 cm (3–4 in) tail Habitat: Forest and grassland Diet: Plant material and invertebrates	DD Unknown
Mirza's western moss rat	M. louiseae Helgen & Helgen, 2009	Papua New Guinea	Size: 9–12 cm (4–5 in) long, plus 10–13 cm (4–5 in) tail Habitat: Forest and grassland Diet: Plant material and invertebrates	LC Unknown

Genus Muriculus – Rüppell, 1842 – one species
Common name	Scientific name and subspecies	Range	Size and ecology	IUCN status and estimated population
Ethiopian striped mouse	M. imberbis Rüppell, 1842	Ethiopia	Size: 7–8 cm (3–3 in) long, plus 4–6 cm (2–2 in) tail Habitat: Grassland Diet: Plant material and invertebrates	LC Unknown

Genus Mus – Linnaeus, 1758 – 39 species
Common name	Scientific name and subspecies	Range	Size and ecology	IUCN status and estimated population
African pygmy mouse	M. minutoides (Smith, 1834)	Sub-Saharan Africa	Size: 4–8 cm (2–3 in) long, plus 2–6 cm (1–2 in) tail Habitat: Grassland, savanna, shrubland, and forest Diet: Seeds, roots, leaves, stems, and other vegetation, as well as insects and some meat	LC Unknown
Algerian mouse	M. spretus Lataste, 1883	Northern Africa and southwestern Europe	Size: 7–10 cm (3–4 in) long, plus 4–8 cm (2–3 in) tail Habitat: Forest, grassland, shrubland, and savanna Diet: Seeds, roots, leaves, stems, and other vegetation, as well as insects and some meat	LC Unknown
Baoule's mouse	M. baoulei (Vermeiren & Verheyen, 1980)	Western Africa	Size: 5–7 cm (2–3 in) long, plus 3–5 cm (1–2 in) tail Habitat: Savanna Diet: Seeds, roots, leaves, stems, and other vegetation, as well as insects and some meat	LC Unknown
Callewaert's mouse	M. callewaerti (Thomas, 1925)	Democratic Republic of the Congo	Size: 8–9 cm (3–4 in) long, plus 4–6 cm (2–2 in) tail Habitat: Forest and savanna Diet: Seeds, roots, leaves, stems, and other vegetation, as well as insects and some meat	DD Unknown
Ceylon spiny mouse	M. fernandoni (Phillips, 1932)	Sri Lanka	Size: 9–11 cm (4 in) long, plus 6–7 cm (2–3 in) tail Habitat: Forest and grassland Diet: Seeds, roots, leaves, stems, and other vegetation, as well as insects and some meat	EN Unknown
Cook's mouse	M. cookii Ryley, 1914	Southeastern Asia	Size: 7–10 cm (3–4 in) long, plus 8–10 cm (3–4 in) tail Habitat: Forest and grassland Diet: Seeds, roots, leaves, stems, and other vegetation, as well as insects and some meat	LC Unknown
Cypriot mouse	M. cypriacus Cucchi, Orth, Auffray, Renaud, Fabre, Catalan, Hadjisterkotis, Bonhomme & Vigne, 2006	Cyprus	Size: 7–10 cm (3–4 in) long, plus 6–10 cm (2–4 in) tail Habitat: Forest and shrubland Diet: Seeds, roots, leaves, stems, and other vegetation, as well as insects and some meat	LC Unknown
Delicate mouse	M. tenellus (Thomas, 1903)	Eastern Africa	Size: 4–7 cm (2–3 in) long, plus 3–5 cm (1–2 in) tail Habitat: Savanna Diet: Seeds, roots, leaves, stems, and other vegetation, as well as insects and some meat	LC Unknown
Desert pygmy mouse	M. indutus (Thomas, 1910)	Southern Africa	Size: 4–7 cm (2–3 in) long, plus 3–6 cm (1–2 in) tail Habitat: Grassland and savanna Diet: Seeds, roots, leaves, stems, and other vegetation, as well as insects and some meat	LC Unknown
Earth-colored mouse	M. terricolor Blyth, 1851	Southern Asia	Size: 5–7 cm (2–3 in) long, plus 5–7 cm (2–3 in) tail Habitat: Grassland, shrubland, and forest Diet: Seeds, roots, leaves, stems, and other vegetation, as well as insects and some meat	LC Unknown
Fawn-colored mouse	M. cervicolor Hodgson, 1845	Southern and southeastern Asia	Size: 5–7 cm (2–3 in) long, plus 5–7 cm (2–3 in) tail Habitat: Grassland, shrubland, and forest Diet: Seeds, roots, leaves, stems, and other vegetation, as well as insects and some meat	LC Unknown
Gairdner's shrewmouse	M. pahari Thomas, 1916	Southeastern Asia	Size: 7–11 cm (3–4 in) long, plus 7–10 cm (3–4 in) tail Habitat: Forest Diet: Seeds, roots, leaves, stems, and other vegetation, as well as insects and some meat	LC Unknown
Gounda mouse	M. goundae Petter & Genest, 1970	Central African Republic	Size: 5–7 cm (2–3 in) long, plus 3–4 cm (1–2 in) tail Habitat: Savanna Diet: Seeds, roots, leaves, stems, and other vegetation, as well as insects and some meat	DD Unknown
Gray-bellied pygmy mouse	M. triton (Thomas, 1909)	Central Africa	Size: 5–9 cm (2–4 in) long, plus 4–7 cm (2–3 in) tail Habitat: Grassland and forest Diet: Seeds, roots, leaves, stems, and other vegetation, as well as insects and some meat	LC Unknown
Harenna mouse	M. harennensis Lavrenchenko & Bryja, 2022	Ethiopia	Size: 6–9 cm (2–4 in) long, plus 5–7 cm (2–3 in) tail Habitat: Shrubland and grassland Diet: Seeds, roots, leaves, stems, and other vegetation, as well as insects and some meat	VU Unknown
Hausa mouse	M. haussa (Thomas & Hinton, 1920)	Western Africa	Size: 4–6 cm (2–2 in) long, plus 3–5 cm (1–2 in) tail Habitat: Savanna Diet: Seeds, roots, leaves, stems, and other vegetation, as well as insects and some meat	LC Unknown
House mouse	M. musculus Linnaeus, 1758 Five subspecies: M. m. bactrianus; M. m. castaneus; M. m. gentilulus; M. m. musculus; M. m. domesticus	Worldwide	Size: 7–11 cm (3–4 in) long, plus 6–11 cm (2–4 in) tail Habitat: Coastal marine, grassland, inland wetlands, and shrubland Diet: Seeds, roots, leaves, stems, and other vegetation, as well as insects and some meat	LC Unknown
Little Indian field mouse	M. booduga (Gray, 1837)	Southern Asia	Size: 5–7 cm (2–3 in) long, plus 5–8 cm (2–3 in) tail Habitat: Grassland, shrubland, and forest Diet: Seeds, roots, leaves, stems, and other vegetation, as well as insects and some meat	LC Unknown
Macedonian mouse	M. macedonicus Petrov & Ružić, 1983	Western Asia and southeastern Europe	Size: 6–10 cm (2–4 in) long, plus 5–9 cm (2–4 in) tail Habitat: Shrubland and coastal marine Diet: Seeds, roots, leaves, stems, and other vegetation, as well as insects and some meat	LC Unknown
Mahomet mouse	M. mahomet Rhoads, 1896	Ethiopia	Size: 6–8 cm (2–3 in) long, plus 4–6 cm (2–2 in) tail Habitat: Shrubland and forest Diet: Seeds, roots, leaves, stems, and other vegetation, as well as insects and some meat	LC Unknown
Matthey's mouse	M. mattheyi Petter, 1969	Western Africa	Size: 4–7 cm (2–3 in) long, plus 3–5 cm (1–2 in) tail Habitat: Savanna Diet: Seeds, roots, leaves, stems, and other vegetation, as well as insects and some meat	LC Unknown
Mayor's mouse	M. mayori (Thomas, 1915)	Sri Lanka	Size: About 10 cm (4 in) long, plus about 10 cm (4 in) tail Habitat: Grassland and forest Diet: Seeds, roots, leaves, stems, and other vegetation, as well as insects and some meat	VU Unknown
Neave's mouse	M. neavei (Thomas, 1910)	Southern Africa	Size: 5–11 cm (2–4 in) long, plus 3–5 cm (1–2 in) tail Habitat: Savanna, rocky areas, and grassland Diet: Seeds, roots, leaves, stems, and other vegetation, as well as insects and some meat	DD Unknown
Oubangui mouse	M. oubanguii Petter & Genest, 1970	Central African Republic	Size: 5–7 cm (2–3 in) long, plus 2–5 cm (1–2 in) tail Habitat: Savanna Diet: Seeds, roots, leaves, stems, and other vegetation, as well as insects and some meat	DD Unknown
Peters's mouse	M. setulosus Peters, 1876	Northern Sub-Saharan Africa	Size: 5–9 cm (2–4 in) long, plus 4–7 cm (2–3 in) tail Habitat: Forest, savanna, and shrubland Diet: Seeds, roots, leaves, stems, and other vegetation, as well as insects and some meat	LC Unknown
Phillips's mouse	M. phillipsi Wroughton, 1912	India	Size: 6–8 cm (2–3 in) long, plus 5–7 cm (2–3 in) tail Habitat: Grassland, forest, and shrubland Diet: Seeds, roots, leaves, stems, and other vegetation, as well as insects and some meat	LC Unknown
Rock-loving mouse	M. saxicola Elliot, 1839	Southern Asia	Size: 7–12 cm (3–5 in) long, plus 5–10 cm (2–4 in) tail Habitat: Shrubland, forest, and grassland Diet: Seeds, roots, leaves, stems, and other vegetation, as well as insects and some meat	LC Unknown
Ryukyu mouse	M. caroli Bonhote, 1902	Southeastern Asia	Size: 6–10 cm (2–4 in) long, plus 6–10 cm (2–4 in) tail Habitat: Grassland and shrubland Diet: Seeds, roots, leaves, stems, and other vegetation, as well as insects and some meat	LC Unknown
Servant mouse	M. famulus Bonhote, 1898	Southern India	Size: 9–10 cm (4 in) long, plus 7–10 cm (3–4 in) tail Habitat: Grassland and forest Diet: Seeds, roots, leaves, stems, and other vegetation, as well as insects and some meat	EN Unknown
Setzer's pygmy mouse	M. setzeri Petter, 1978	Southern Africa	Size: About 6 cm (2 in) long, plus 3–5 cm (1–2 in) tail Habitat: Inland wetlands, grassland, and savanna Diet: Seeds, roots, leaves, stems, and other vegetation, as well as insects and some meat	LC Unknown
Sheath-tailed mouse	M. fragilicauda Auffray, Orth, Catalan, Gonzalez, Desmarais & Bonhomme,	Thailand and Laos	Size: 6–7 cm (2–3 in) long, plus 5–7 cm (2–3 in) tail Habitat: Grassland and shrubland Diet: Seeds, roots, leaves, stems, and other vegetation, as well as insects and some meat	LC Unknown
Shortridge's mouse	M. shortridgei Thomas, 1914	Southeastern Asia	Size: 9–12 cm (4–5 in) long, plus 6–9 cm (2–4 in) tail Habitat: Grassland and shrubland Diet: Seeds, roots, leaves, stems, and other vegetation, as well as insects and some meat	LC Unknown
Steppe mouse	M. spicilegus Petényi, 1882	Eastern Europe and Russia	Size: 5–10 cm (2–4 in) long, plus 5–7 cm (2–3 in) tail Habitat: Grassland Diet: Seeds, roots, leaves, stems, and other vegetation, as well as insects and some meat	LC Unknown
Stone-loving mouse	M. platythrix Bennett, 1832	India	Size: 7–13 cm (3–5 in) long, plus 5–9 cm (2–4 in) tail Habitat: Grassland, shrubland, and forest Diet: Seeds, roots, leaves, stems, and other vegetation, as well as insects and some meat	LC Unknown
Sumatran shrewlike mouse	M. crociduroides (Robinson & Kloss, 1916)	Sumatra island	Size: 7–10 cm (3–4 in) long, plus 11–13 cm (4–5 in) tail Habitat: Forest Diet: Seeds, roots, leaves, stems, and other vegetation, as well as insects and some meat	DD Unknown
Temminck's mouse	M. musculoides (Temminck, 1853)	Sub-Saharan Africa	Size: 5–8 cm (2–3 in) long, plus 4–6 cm (2–2 in) tail Habitat: Shrubland, grassland, forest, savanna, and rocky areas Diet: Seeds, roots, leaves, stems, and other vegetation, as well as insects and some meat	LC Unknown
Thomas's pygmy mouse	M. sorella (Thomas, 1909)	Democratic Republic of the Congo	Size: 5–8 cm (2–3 in) long, plus 3–5 cm (1–2 in) tail Habitat: Forest and savanna Diet: Seeds, roots, leaves, stems, and other vegetation, as well as insects and some meat	LC Unknown
Toad mouse	M. bufo (Thomas, 1906)	Central Africa	Size: 6–8 cm (2–3 in) long, plus 6–7 cm (2–3 in) tail Habitat: Forest Diet: Seeds, roots, leaves, stems, and other vegetation, as well as insects and some meat	LC Unknown
Volcano mouse	M. vulcani (Robinson & Kloss, 1919)	Java island	Size: 8–10 cm (3–4 in) long, plus 8–10 cm (3–4 in) tail Habitat: Shrubland and forest Diet: Seeds, roots, leaves, stems, and other vegetation, as well as insects and some meat	LC Unknown

Genus Musseromys – Heaney, Balete, Rickart, Veluz, & Jansa, 2009 – four species
Common name	Scientific name and subspecies	Range	Size and ecology	IUCN status and estimated population
Amuyao tree-mouse	M. inopinatus Heaney, Balete, Rickart, Veluz, & Jansa, 2014	Luzon island	Size: About 8 cm (3 in) long, plus 8–9 cm (3–4 in) tail Habitat: Forest Diet: Plant material and invertebrates	DD Unknown
Banahaw tree mouse	M. gulantang Heaney, Balete, Rickart, Veluz, & Jansa, 2014	Luzon island	Size: About 8 cm (3 in) long, plus about 10 cm (4 in) tail Habitat: Forest Diet: Plant material and invertebrates	DD Unknown
Mount Pulag tree-mouse	M. beneficus Heaney, Balete, Rickart, Veluz, & Jansa, 2014	Luzon island	Size: 7–9 cm (3–4 in) long, plus about 8 cm (3 in) tail Habitat: Forest Diet: Plant material and invertebrates	DD Unknown
Sierra Madre tree-mouse	M. anacuao Heaney, Balete, Rickart, Veluz, & Jansa, 2014	Luzon island	Size: 7–9 cm (3–4 in) long, plus 8–9 cm (3–4 in) tail Habitat: Forest Diet: Plant material and invertebrates	DD Unknown

Genus Mylomys – Thomas, 1906 – two species
Common name	Scientific name and subspecies	Range	Size and ecology	IUCN status and estimated population
African groove-toothed rat	M. dybowskii (Pousargues, 1893)	Northern Sub-Saharan Africa	Size: 12–20 cm (5–8 in) long, plus 10–18 cm (4–7 in) tail Habitat: Savanna and forest Diet: Grass and leaves	LC Unknown
Ethiopian mylomys	M. rex (Thomas, 1906)	Ethiopia	Size: About 21 cm (8 in) long, plus about 18 cm (7 in) tail Habitat: Forest Diet: Grass and leaves	DD Unknown

Genus Myomyscus – Shortridge, 1942 – four species
Common name	Scientific name and subspecies	Range	Size and ecology	IUCN status and estimated population
Brockman's rock mouse	M. brockmani (Thomas, 1908)	Central and eastern Africa	Size: 9–13 cm (4–5 in) long, plus 11–18 cm (4–7 in) tail Habitat: Rocky areas and savanna Diet: Insects, leaves, and shoots	LC Unknown
Myomyscus angolensis	M. angolensis (Bocage, 1890)	Angola	Size: 10–13 cm (4–5 in) long, plus 10–13 cm (4–5 in) tail Habitat: Savanna Diet: Insects, leaves, and shoots	LC Unknown
Verreaux's mouse	M. verreauxii (Smith, 1834)	South Africa	Size: 9–12 cm (4–5 in) long, plus 13–15 cm (5–6 in) tail Habitat: Shrubland Diet: Insects, leaves, and shoots	LC Unknown
Yemeni mouse	M. yemeni (Sanborn & Hoogstraal, 1953)	Southern Saudi Arabia and Yemen	Size: 7–12 cm (3–5 in) long, plus 15–18 cm (6–7 in) tail Habitat: Shrubland Diet: Insects, leaves, and shoots	DD Unknown

Genus Nesokia – Gray, 1842 – two species
Common name	Scientific name and subspecies	Range	Size and ecology	IUCN status and estimated population
Bunn's short-tailed bandicoot rat	N. bunnii (Khajuria, 1981)	Iraq	Size: 23–26 cm (9–10 in) long, plus 20–27 cm (8–11 in) tail Habitat: Inland wetlands and grassland Diet: Grass, grain, roots, fruit, and vegetables	EN Unknown
Short-tailed bandicoot rat	N. indica (Gray, 1830)	Scattered Asia and Egypt	Size: 15–20 cm (6–8 in) long, plus 9–15 cm (4–6 in) tail Habitat: Grassland, shrubland, and forest Diet: Grass, grain, roots, fruit, and vegetables	LC Unknown

Genus Nesoromys – Thomas, 1922 – one species
Common name	Scientific name and subspecies	Range	Size and ecology	IUCN status and estimated population
Ceram rat	N. ceramicus (Thomas, 1920)	Seram Island in Indonesia	Size: 11–14 cm (4–6 in) long, plus 12–14 cm (5–6 in) tail Habitat: Forest Diet: Plant material and invertebrates	EN Unknown

Genus Nilopegamys – Osgood, 1928 – one species
Common name	Scientific name and subspecies	Range	Size and ecology	IUCN status and estimated population
Ethiopian amphibious rat	N. plumbeus Osgood, 1928	Ethiopia	Size: About 15 cm (6 in) long, plus about 18 cm (7 in) tail Habitat: Inland wetlands Diet: Plant material and invertebrates	CR Unknown

Genus Niviventer – Marshall, 1976 – seventeen species
Common name	Scientific name and subspecies	Range	Size and ecology	IUCN status and estimated population
Anderson's white-bellied rat	N. andersoni (Thomas, 1911)	China	Size: 13–20 cm (5–8 in) long, plus 20–27 cm (8–11 in) tail Habitat: Forest Diet: Plant material and invertebrates	LC Unknown
Brahma white-bellied rat	N. brahma (Thomas, 1914)	Southern Asia	Size: 13–16 cm (5–6 in) long, plus 20–24 cm (8–9 in) tail Habitat: Forest Diet: Plant material and invertebrates	LC Unknown
Cameron Highlands white-bellied rat	N. cameroni Chasen, 1940	Malaysia	Size: 13–17 cm (5–7 in) long, plus 20–27 cm (8–11 in) tail Habitat: Forest Diet: Plant material and invertebrates	VU Unknown
Chestnut white-bellied rat	N. fulvescens (Gray, 1847)	Southern and southeastern Asia	Size: 10–16 cm (4–6 in) long, plus 15–22 cm (6–9 in) tail Habitat: Forest Diet: Plant material and invertebrates	LC Unknown
Chinese white-bellied rat	N. confucianus (A. Milne-Edwards, 1871)	Eastern and southeastern Asia	Size: 11–21 cm (4–8 in) long, plus 11–19 cm (4–7 in) tail Habitat: Forest Diet: Plant material and invertebrates	LC Unknown
Coxing's white-bellied rat	N. coninga (Swinhoe, 1864)	Taiwan	Size: 14–20 cm (6–8 in) long, plus 17–26 cm (7–10 in) tail Habitat: Shrubland and forest Diet: Plant material and invertebrates	LC Unknown
Dark-tailed tree rat	N. cremoriventer (Miller, 1900)	Southeastern Asia	Size: 12–15 cm (5–6 in) long, plus 15–20 cm (6–8 in) tail Habitat: Forest Diet: Plant material and invertebrates	LC Unknown
Lang Bian white-bellied rat	N. langbianis (Robinson & Kloss, 1922)	Southeastern Asia	Size: 13–16 cm (5–6 in) long, plus 15–20 cm (6–8 in) tail Habitat: Forest Diet: Plant material and invertebrates	LC Unknown
Large white-bellied rat	N. excelsior (Thomas, 1911)	China	Size: 12–15 cm (5–6 in) long, plus 18–22 cm (7–9 in) tail Habitat: Forest Diet: Plant material and invertebrates	LC Unknown
Limestone rat	N. hinpoon (Marshall, 1976)	Thailand	Size: 12–16 cm (5–6 in) long, plus 12–16 cm (5–6 in) tail Habitat: Shrubland and forest Diet: Plant material and invertebrates	EN Unknown
Long-tailed mountain rat	N. rapit (Bonhote, 1903)	Borneo	Size: About 14 cm (6 in) long, plus about 20 cm (8 in) tail Habitat: Shrubland and forest Diet: Plant material and invertebrates	LC Unknown
Montane Sumatran white-bellied rat	N. fraternus (Robinson & Kloss, 1916)	Sumatra island	Size: About 16 cm (6 in) long, plus about 23 cm (9 in) tail Habitat: Forest Diet: Plant material and invertebrates	LC Unknown
Narrow-tailed white-bellied rat	N. lepturus (Jentink, 1879)	Java island	Size: About 14 cm (6 in) long, plus about 18 cm (7 in) tail Habitat: Forest Diet: Plant material and invertebrates	LC Unknown
Oldfield white-bellied rat	N. culturatus (Thomas, 1911)	Taiwan	Size: 13–15 cm (5–6 in) long, plus 17–20 cm (7–8 in) tail Habitat: Forest Diet: Plant material and invertebrates	LC Unknown
Smoke-bellied rat	N. eha (Wroughton, 1916)	Southern Asia	Size: 11–13 cm (4–5 in) long, plus 16–20 cm (6–8 in) tail Habitat: Forest Diet: Plant material and invertebrates	LC Unknown
Tenasserim white-bellied rat	N. tenaster (Thomas, 1916)	Southeastern Asia	Size: 12–19 cm (5–7 in) long, plus 17–23 cm (7–9 in) tail Habitat: Forest Diet: Plant material and invertebrates	LC Unknown
White-bellied rat	N. niviventer (Hodgson, 1836)	Southern Asia	Size: 13–16 cm (5–6 in) long, plus about 21 cm (8 in) tail Habitat: Forest Diet: Plant material and invertebrates	LC Unknown

Genus Notomys – Lesson, 1842 – ten species
Common name	Scientific name and subspecies	Range	Size and ecology	IUCN status and estimated population
Big-eared hopping mouse †	N. macrotis Thomas, 1921	Western Australia	Size: Unknown Habitat: Unknown Diet: Berries, leaves, seeds, and other vegetation	EX 0
Darling Downs hopping mouse †	N. mordax Thomas, 1922	Northeastern Australia	Size: Unknown Habitat: Unknown Diet: Berries, leaves, seeds, and other vegetation	EX 0
Dusky hopping mouse	N. fuscus Jones, 1925	Central Australia	Size: 7–12 cm (3–5 in) long, plus 11–16 cm (4–6 in) tail Habitat: Desert and shrubland Diet: Berries, leaves, seeds, and other vegetation	NT 2,500–20,000
Fawn hopping mouse	N. cervinus (Gould, 1853)	Central Australia	Size: 9–12 cm (4–5 in) long, plus 10–16 cm (4–6 in) tail Habitat: Desert Diet: Berries, leaves, seeds, and other vegetation	NT 4,500–180,000
Great hopping mouse †	N. robustus Mahoney, Smith, & Medlin, 2008	Southern Australia	Size: Unknown Habitat: Shrubland, rocky areas, savanna, and grassland Diet: Berries, leaves, seeds, and other vegetation	EX 0
Long-tailed hopping mouse †	N. longicaudatus (Gould, 1844)	Australia	Size: Unknown Habitat: Shrubland, desert, savanna, and grassland Diet: Berries, leaves, seeds, and other vegetation	EX 0
Mitchell's hopping mouse	N. mitchellii (Ogilby, 1838)	Southern Australia	Size: 10–13 cm (4–5 in) long, plus 14–16 cm (6 in) tail Habitat: Shrubland and savanna Diet: Berries, leaves, seeds, and other vegetation	LC Unknown
Northern hopping mouse	N. aquilo Thomas, 1921	Northern Australia	Size: 8–12 cm (3–5 in) long, plus 15–18 cm (6–7 in) tail Habitat: Forest, shrubland, and grassland Diet: Berries, leaves, seeds, and other vegetation	EN 1,000–3,700
Short-tailed hopping mouse †	N. amplus Brazenor, 1936	Australia	Size: Unknown Habitat: Unknown Diet: Berries, leaves, seeds, and other vegetation	EX 0
Spinifex hopping mouse	N. alexis Thomas, 1922	Australia	Size: 9–12 cm (4–5 in) long, plus 11–15 cm (4–6 in) tail Habitat: Desert and shrubland Diet: Berries, leaves, seeds, and other vegetation	LC Unknown

Genus Oenomys – Thomas, 1904 – two species
Common name	Scientific name and subspecies	Range	Size and ecology	IUCN status and estimated population
Common rufous-nosed rat	O. hypoxanthus (Pucheran, 1855)	Central Africa	Size: 13–19 cm (5–7 in) long, plus 15–20 cm (6–8 in) tail Habitat: Forest, shrubland, and grassland Diet: Vegetation, as well as insects	LC Unknown
Ghana rufous-nosed rat	O. ornatus Thomas, 1911	Western Africa	Size: 13–16 cm (5–6 in) long, plus 17–20 cm (7–8 in) tail Habitat: Savanna and forest Diet: Vegetation, as well as insects	DD Unknown

Genus Otomys – F. Cuvier, 1824 – 28 species
Common name	Scientific name and subspecies	Range	Size and ecology	IUCN status and estimated population
Afroalpine vlei rat	O. orestes Thomas, 1900	Kenya	Size: 13–18 cm (5–7 in) long, plus 6–10 cm (2–4 in) tail Habitat: Grassland Diet: Grass, semiaquatic plants, and shoots, as well as grain, seeds, berries, roots, and bark	NE Unknown
Angolan vlei rat	O. anchietae Bocage, 1882	Angola	Size: 19–22 cm (7–9 in) long, plus 8–13 cm (3–5 in) tail Habitat: Savanna Diet: Grass, semiaquatic plants, and shoots, as well as grain, seeds, berries, roots, and bark	LC Unknown
Angoni vlei rat	O. angoniensis Wroughton, 1906	Scattered Sub-Saharan Africa	Size: 12–20 cm (5–8 in) long, plus 4–10 cm (2–4 in) tail Habitat: Savanna and inland wetlands Diet: Grass, semiaquatic plants, and shoots, as well as grain, seeds, berries, roots, and bark	LC Unknown
Barbour's vlei rat	O. barbouri Lawrence & Loveridge, 1953	Eastern Uganda and western Kenya	Size: 12–21 cm (5–8 in) long, plus 5–10 cm (2–4 in) tail Habitat: Shrubland and grassland Diet: Grass, semiaquatic plants, and shoots, as well as grain, seeds, berries, roots, and bark	EN Unknown
Burton's vlei rat	O. burtoni Thomas, 1918	Cameroon	Size: 14–17 cm (6–7 in) long, plus 7–9 cm (3–4 in) tail Habitat: Grassland Diet: Grass, semiaquatic plants, and shoots, as well as grain, seeds, berries, roots, and bark	EN Unknown
Charada vlei rat	O. fortior Thomas, 1906	Ethiopia	Size: 14–19 cm (6–7 in) long, plus 8–10 cm (3–4 in) tail Habitat: Forest Diet: Grass, semiaquatic plants, and shoots, as well as grain, seeds, berries, roots, and bark	VU Unknown
Cheesman's vlei rat	O. cheesmani Taylor, Lavrenchenko, Carleton, Verheyen, Bennett, Oosthuizen, & Maree, 2011	Ethiopia	Size: 16–21 cm (6–8 in) long, plus 7–11 cm (3–4 in) tail Habitat: Grassland Diet: Grass, semiaquatic plants, and shoots, as well as grain, seeds, berries, roots, and bark	CR Unknown
Cuanza vlei rat	O. cuanzensis Hill & Carter, 1937	Angola	Size: 13–19 cm (5–7 in) long, plus 8–12 cm (3–5 in) tail Habitat: Inland wetlands and grassland Diet: Grass, semiaquatic plants, and shoots, as well as grain, seeds, berries, roots, and bark	LC Unknown
Dent's vlei rat	O. denti Thomas, 1906	Central Africa	Size: 13–17 cm (5–7 in) long, plus 7–11 cm (3–4 in) tail Habitat: Shrubland, grassland, and forest Diet: Grass, semiaquatic plants, and shoots, as well as grain, seeds, berries, roots, and bark	LC Unknown
Dollman's vlei rat	O. dollmani Heller, 1912	Kenya	Size: 13–15 cm (5–6 in) long, plus 8–11 cm (3–4 in) tail Habitat: Inland wetlands and grassland Diet: Grass, semiaquatic plants, and shoots, as well as grain, seeds, berries, roots, and bark	NE Unknown
Ethiopian vlei rat	O. typus (Heuglin, 1877)	Ethiopia	Size: 15–18 cm (6–7 in) long, plus 7–10 cm (3–4 in) tail Habitat: Grassland and shrubland Diet: Grass, semiaquatic plants, and shoots, as well as grain, seeds, berries, roots, and bark	LC Unknown
Fynbos vlei rat	O. karoensis Roberts, 1931	South Africa	Size: 11–16 cm (4–6 in) long, plus 8–12 cm (3–5 in) tail Habitat: Inland wetlands and grassland Diet: Grass, semiaquatic plants, and shoots, as well as grain, seeds, berries, roots, and bark	LC Unknown
Heller's vlei rat	O. helleri Frick, 1914	Ethiopia	Size: 12–19 cm (5–7 in) long, plus 6–10 cm (2–4 in) tail Habitat: Shrubland and grassland Diet: Grass, semiaquatic plants, and shoots, as well as grain, seeds, berries, roots, and bark	LC Unknown
Karoo vlei rat	O. unisulcatus F. Cuvier, 1829	South Africa and Namibia	Size: 11–20 cm (4–8 in) long, plus 6–11 cm (2–4 in) tail Habitat: Shrubland Diet: Grass, semiaquatic plants, and shoots, as well as grain, seeds, berries, roots, and bark	LC Unknown
Laminate vlei rat	O. laminatus Thomas & Schwann, 1905	South Africa	Size: 15–21 cm (6–8 in) long, plus 9–12 cm (4–5 in) tail Habitat: Inland wetlands and grassland Diet: Grass, semiaquatic plants, and shoots, as well as grain, seeds, berries, roots, and bark	NT Unknown
Mount Elgon vlei rat	O. jacksoni Thomas, 1891	Eastern Uganda and western Kenya	Size: 12–18 cm (5–7 in) long, plus 5–9 cm (2–4 in) tail Habitat: Grassland Diet: Grass, semiaquatic plants, and shoots, as well as grain, seeds, berries, roots, and bark	NT Unknown
Mount Kilimanjaro vlei rat	O. zinki Bohmann, 1943	Tanzania	Size: 13–19 cm (5–7 in) long, plus 6–11 cm (2–4 in) tail Habitat: Forest and shrubland Diet: Grass, semiaquatic plants, and shoots, as well as grain, seeds, berries, roots, and bark	VU Unknown
Ruwenzori vlei rat	O. dartmouthi Thomas, 1906	Western Uganda and eastern Democratic Republic of the Congo	Size: About 15 cm (6 in) long, plus about 9 cm (4 in) tail Habitat: Grassland Diet: Grass, semiaquatic plants, and shoots, as well as grain, seeds, berries, roots, and bark	DD Unknown
Simien vlei rat	O. simiensis Taylor, Lavrenchenko, Carleton, Verheyen, Bennett, Oosthuizen, & Maree, 2011	Ethiopia	Size: 13–18 cm (5–7 in) long, plus 7–9 cm (3–4 in) tail Habitat: Shrubland Diet: Grass, semiaquatic plants, and shoots, as well as grain, seeds, berries, roots, and bark	LC Unknown
Sloggett's vlei rat	O. sloggetti (Thomas, 1902)	South Africa and Lesotho	Size: 12–17 cm (5–7 in) long, plus 8–12 cm (3–5 in) tail Habitat: Rocky areas, grassland, and inland wetlands Diet: Grass, semiaquatic plants, and shoots, as well as grain, seeds, berries, roots, and bark	LC Unknown
South East African vlei rat	O. auratus Wroughton, 1906	Southern Africa	Size: 13–20 cm (5–8 in) long, plus 5–12 cm (2–5 in) tail Habitat: Inland wetlands and grassland Diet: Grass, semiaquatic plants, and shoots, as well as grain, seeds, berries, roots, and bark	NT Unknown
Southern African vlei rat	O. irroratus (Brants, 1827)	South Africa	Size: 13–19 cm (5–7 in) long, plus 8–12 cm (3–5 in) tail Habitat: Grassland and inland wetlands Diet: Grass, semiaquatic plants, and shoots, as well as grain, seeds, berries, roots, and bark	LC Unknown
Tanzanian vlei rat	O. lacustris Allen & Loveridge, 1933	Tanzania and Zambia	Size: 15–19 cm (6–7 in) long, plus 9–11 cm (4 in) tail Habitat: Inland wetlands and grassland Diet: Grass, semiaquatic plants, and shoots, as well as grain, seeds, berries, roots, and bark	LC Unknown
Thomas's vlei rat	O. thomasi Osgood, 1910	Kenya	Size: 16–19 cm (6–7 in) long, plus 8–10 cm (3–4 in) tail Habitat: Grassland Diet: Grass, semiaquatic plants, and shoots, as well as grain, seeds, berries, roots, and bark	VU Unknown
Tropical vlei rat	O. tropicalis Thomas, 1902	East-central Africa	Size: 12–20 cm (5–8 in) long, plus 5–11 cm (2–4 in) tail Habitat: Inland wetlands and grassland Diet: Grass, semiaquatic plants, and shoots, as well as grain, seeds, berries, roots, and bark	LC Unknown
Uzungwe vlei rat	O. uzungwensis Lawrence & Loveridge, 1953	Tanzania and Malawi	Size: Unknown Habitat: Forest Diet: Grass, semiaquatic plants, and shoots, as well as grain, seeds, berries, roots, and bark	NT Unknown
Western vlei rat	O. occidentalis Dieterlen & Van der Straeten, 1992	Eastern Nigeria and western Cameroon	Size: 13–16 cm (5–6 in) long, plus 6–9 cm (2–4 in) tail Habitat: Grassland Diet: Grass, semiaquatic plants, and shoots, as well as grain, seeds, berries, roots, and bark	VU Unknown
Yalden's vlei rat	O. yaldeni Taylor, Lavrenchenko, Carleton, Verheyen, Bennett, Oosthuizen, & Maree, 2011	Ethiopia	Size: 12–16 cm (5–6 in) long, plus 7–8 cm (3–3 in) tail Habitat: Forest and grassland Diet: Grass, semiaquatic plants, and shoots, as well as grain, seeds, berries, roots, and bark	VU Unknown

Genus Palawanomys – Musser & Newcomb, 1983 – one species
Common name	Scientific name and subspecies	Range	Size and ecology	IUCN status and estimated population
Palawan soft-furred mountain rat	P. furvus Musser & Newcomb, 1983	Philippines	Size: 13–16 cm (5–6 in) long, plus 14–17 cm (6–7 in) tail Habitat: Forest Diet: Plant material and invertebrates	LC Unknown

Genus Papagomys – Sody, 1941 – one species
Common name	Scientific name and subspecies	Range	Size and ecology	IUCN status and estimated population
Flores giant rat	P. armandvillei (Jentink, 1892)	Flores island in Indonesia	Size: 27–43 cm (11–17 in) long, plus 26–36 cm (10–14 in) tail Habitat: Forest Diet: Unknown	NT Unknown

Genus Parahydromys – Poche, 1906 – one species
Common name	Scientific name and subspecies	Range	Size and ecology	IUCN status and estimated population
New Guinea waterside rat	P. asper (Thomas, 1906)	New Guinea	Size: 21–23 cm (8–9 in) long, plus 23–27 cm (9–11 in) tail Habitat: Inland wetlands and forest Diet: Insects and other invertebrates	LC Unknown

Genus Paraleptomys – Tate & Archbold, 1941 – two species
Common name	Scientific name and subspecies	Range	Size and ecology	IUCN status and estimated population
Northern water rat	P. rufilatus Osgood, 1945	Northern New Guinea	Size: 11–14 cm (4–6 in) long, plus 12–15 cm (5–6 in) tail Habitat: Forest Diet: Plant material and invertebrates	EN Unknown
Short-haired water rat	P. wilhelmina Tate & Archbold, 1941	New Guinea	Size: 10–13 cm (4–5 in) long, plus 12–14 cm (5–6 in) tail Habitat: Forest Diet: Plant material and invertebrates	DD Unknown

Genus Paramelomys – Rümmler, 1936 – nine species
Common name	Scientific name and subspecies	Range	Size and ecology	IUCN status and estimated population
Gressitt's mosaic-tailed rat	P. gressitti (Menzies, 1996)	Papua New Guinea	Size: 13–17 cm (5–7 in) long, plus tail Habitat: Forest Diet: Fruit, berries, and other vegetation	EN Unknown
Long-nosed mosaic-tailed rat	P. levipes (Thomas, 1897)	Papua New Guinea	Size: 12–17 cm (5–7 in) long, plus 11–14 cm (4–6 in) tail Habitat: Forest Diet: Fruit, berries, and other vegetation	LC Unknown
Long-nosed paramelomys	P. naso Thomas, 1911	Western New Guinea	Size: 15–20 cm (6–8 in) long, plus about 13 cm (5 in) tail Habitat: Forest Diet: Fruit, berries, and other vegetation	LC Unknown
Lorentz's mosaic-tailed rat	P. lorentzii (Jentink, 1908)	New Guinea	Size: 13–20 cm (5–8 in) long, plus 10–14 cm (4–6 in) tail Habitat: Savanna and forest Diet: Fruit, berries, and other vegetation	LC Unknown
Lowland mosaic-tailed rat	P. platyops (Thomas, 1906)	Papua New Guinea	Size: 13–16 cm (5–6 in) long, plus 10–13 cm (4–5 in) tail Habitat: Forest Diet: Fruit, berries, and other vegetation	LC Unknown
Moncton's mosaic-tailed rat	P. moncktoni (Thomas, 1904)	New Guinea and nearby islands	Size: 13–17 cm (5–7 in) long, plus 11–15 cm (4–6 in) tail Habitat: Forest Diet: Fruit, berries, and other vegetation	LC Unknown
Mountain mosaic-tailed rat	P. rubex (Thomas, 1922)	New Guinea	Size: 10–13 cm (4–5 in) long, plus 9–14 cm (4–6 in) tail Habitat: Forest Diet: Fruit, berries, and other vegetation	LC Unknown
Stein's paramelomys	P. steini Rümmler, 1935	Western New Guinea	Size: 12–14 cm (5–6 in) long, plus about 13 cm (5 in) tail Habitat: Forest Diet: Fruit, berries, and other vegetation	DD Unknown
Thomas's mosaic-tailed rat	P. mollis (Thomas, 1913)	New Guinea	Size: 13–19 cm (5–7 in) long, plus about 14 cm (6 in) tail Habitat: Forest Diet: Fruit, berries, and other vegetation	LC Unknown

Genus Parotomys – Thomas, 1918 – two species
Common name	Scientific name and subspecies	Range	Size and ecology	IUCN status and estimated population
Brants's whistling rat	P. brantsii (Smith, 1834)	Southern Africa	Size: 14–16 cm (6 in) long, plus 9–12 cm (4–5 in) tail Habitat: Shrubland Diet: Grass, seeds, and shoots	LC Unknown
Littledale's whistling rat	P. littledalei Thomas, 1918	South Africa and Namibia	Size: 12–17 cm (5–7 in) long, plus 8–11 cm (3–4 in) tail Habitat: Shrubland and desert Diet: Grass, seeds, and shoots	LC Unknown

Genus Paucidentomys – Rowe, Achmadi, & Esselstyn, 2012 – one species
Common name	Scientific name and subspecies	Range	Size and ecology	IUCN status and estimated population
Edented Sulawesi rat	P. vermidax Rowe, Achmadi, & Esselstyn, 2012	Sulawesi island	Size: 15–17 cm (6–7 in) long, plus 19–20 cm (7–8 in) tail Habitat: Forest Diet: Plant material and invertebrates	NT Unknown

Genus Paulamys – Musser, 1986 – one species
Common name	Scientific name and subspecies	Range	Size and ecology	IUCN status and estimated population
Paulamys	P. naso (Musser, 1981)	Flores island	Size: About 16 cm (6 in) long, plus about 12 cm (5 in) tail Habitat: Forest Diet: Insects, snails, worms, fungi, and fruit	EN Unknown

Genus Pelomys – Peters, 1852 – five species
Common name	Scientific name and subspecies	Range	Size and ecology	IUCN status and estimated population
Bell groove-toothed swamp rat	P. campanae (Huet, 1888)	West-central Africa	Size: 12–17 cm (5–7 in) long, plus 13–15 cm (5–6 in) tail Habitat: Savanna and grassland Diet: Grass, swamp vegetation, and grains	LC Unknown
Creek groove-toothed swamp rat	P. fallax (Peters, 1852)	Central Africa	Size: 13–17 cm (5–7 in) long, plus 10–17 cm (4–7 in) tail Habitat: Savanna Diet: Grass, swamp vegetation, and grains	LC Unknown
Hopkins's groove-toothed swamp rat	P. hopkinsi Hayman, 1955	Central Africa	Size: 11–13 cm (4–5 in) long, plus 13–17 cm (5–7 in) tail Habitat: Inland wetlands Diet: Grass, swamp vegetation, and grains	DD Unknown
Issel's groove-toothed swamp rat	P. isseli (de Beaux, 1924)	Uganda and Kenya	Size: 13–15 cm (5–6 in) long, plus 14–16 cm (6 in) tail Habitat: Inland wetlands Diet: Grass, swamp vegetation, and grains	NT Unknown
Least groove-toothed swamp rat	P. minor Cabrera & Ruxton, 1926	Angola and Democratic Republic of the Congo	Size: 10–17 cm (4–7 in) long, plus 10–14 cm (4–6 in) tail Habitat: Savanna Diet: Grass, swamp vegetation, and grains	LC Unknown

Genus Phloeomys – Waterhouse, 1839 – two species
Common name	Scientific name and subspecies	Range	Size and ecology	IUCN status and estimated population
Northern Luzon giant cloud rat	P. pallidus Nehring, 1890	Luzon island	Size: 39–42 cm (15–17 in) long, plus 32–34 cm (13 in) tail Habitat: Forest and shrubland Diet: Vegetation	LC Unknown
Southern giant slender-tailed cloud rat	P. cumingi (Waterhouse, 1839)	Philippines	Size: 40–44 cm (16–17 in) long, plus 27–31 cm (11–12 in) tail Habitat: Forest Diet: Vegetation	LC Unknown

Genus Pithecheir – Lesson, 1840 – two species
Common name	Scientific name and subspecies	Range	Size and ecology	IUCN status and estimated population
Malayan tree rat	P. parvus Kloss, 1916	Malaysia	Size: 12–18 cm (5–7 in) long, plus 15–22 cm (6–9 in) tail Habitat: Forest Diet: Vegetation and insects	DD Unknown
Red tree rat	P. melanurus Lesson, 1840	Java island	Size: 15–18 cm (6–7 in) long, plus 19–21 cm (7–8 in) tail Habitat: Forest Diet: Vegetation and insects	VU Unknown

Genus Pithecheirops – Emmons, 1993 – one species
Common name	Scientific name and subspecies	Range	Size and ecology	IUCN status and estimated population
Bornean pithecheirops	P. otion Emmons, 1993	Eastern Malaysia	Size: About 11 cm (4 in) long, plus about 129 cm (51 in) tail Habitat: Forest Diet: Plant material and invertebrates	DD Unknown

Genus Pogonomelomys – Rümmler, 1936 – three species
Common name	Scientific name and subspecies	Range	Size and ecology	IUCN status and estimated population
Grey pogonomelomys	P. brassi Tate & Archbold, 1941	New Guinea	Size: 17–18 cm (7 in) long, plus 19–20 cm (7–8 in) tail Habitat: Forest Diet: Plant material and invertebrates	LC Unknown
Lowland brush mouse	P. bruijni (Peters & Doria, 1876)	Western New Guinea	Size: About 18 cm (7 in) long, plus about 19 cm (7 in) tail Habitat: Forest Diet: Plant material and invertebrates	LC Unknown
Shaw Mayer's brush mouse	P. mayeri (Rothschild & Dollman, 1932)	New Guinea	Size: 13–16 cm (5–6 in) long, plus 15–20 cm (6–8 in) tail Habitat: Forest Diet: Plant material and invertebrates	LC Unknown

Genus Pogonomys – A. Milne-Edwards, 1877 – five species
Common name	Scientific name and subspecies	Range	Size and ecology	IUCN status and estimated population
Champion's tree mouse	P. championi Flannery, 1988	Papua New Guinea	Size: 11–14 cm (4–6 in) long, plus 14–17 cm (6–7 in) tail Habitat: Forest Diet: Leaves and grass and bamboo shoots	DD Unknown
Chestnut tree mouse	P. macrourus (A. Milne-Edwards, 1877)	Northern Australia, and New Guinea and nearby islands	Size: 9–17 cm (4–7 in) long, plus 12–21 cm (5–8 in) tail Habitat: Forest Diet: Leaves and grass and bamboo shoots	LC Unknown
D'Entrecasteaux Archipelago pogonomys	P. fergussoniensis Laurie, 1952	D'Entrecasteaux Islands in Papua New Guinea	Size: 17–20 cm (7–8 in) long, plus 25–26 cm (10 in) tail Habitat: Forest Diet: Leaves and grass and bamboo shoots	EN Unknown
Gray-bellied tree mouse	P. sylvestris Thomas, 1920	New Guinea	Size: 11–13 cm (4–5 in) long, plus 13–17 cm (5–7 in) tail Habitat: Forest Diet: Leaves and grass and bamboo shoots	LC Unknown
Large tree mouse	P. loriae Thomas, 1897	New Guinea	Size: 12–17 cm (5–7 in) long, plus 18–25 cm (7–10 in) tail Habitat: Forest Diet: Leaves and grass and bamboo shoots	LC Unknown

Genus Praomys – Thomas, 1915 – seventeen species
Common name	Scientific name and subspecies	Range	Size and ecology	IUCN status and estimated population
Cameroon soft-furred mouse	P. morio (Trouessart, 1881)	Cameroon	Size: 10–13 cm (4–5 in) long, plus 11–15 cm (4–6 in) tail Habitat: Forest Diet: Fruit, seeds, vegetation, and insects	EN Unknown
Coetzee's soft-furred mouse	P. coetzeei Van der Straeten, 2008	Angola	Size: 9–14 cm (4–6 in) long, plus 12–17 cm (5–7 in) tail Habitat: Forest Diet: Fruit, seeds, vegetation, and insects	DD Unknown
Dalton's mouse	P. daltoni (Thomas, 1892)	Western and central Africa	Size: 9–14 cm (4–6 in) long, plus 10–15 cm (4–6 in) tail Habitat: Rocky areas and savanna Diet: Fruit, seeds, vegetation, and insects	LC Unknown
De Graaff's soft-furred mouse	P. degraaffi Van der Straeten & Peterhans, 1999	Central Africa	Size: 9–13 cm (4–5 in) long, plus 11–16 cm (4–6 in) tail Habitat: Forest Diet: Fruit, seeds, vegetation, and insects	LC Unknown
Delectable soft-furred mouse	P. delectorum (Thomas, 1910)	Eastern Africa	Size: 9–12 cm (4–5 in) long, plus 11–15 cm (4–6 in) tail Habitat: Forest Diet: Fruit, seeds, vegetation, and insects	LC Unknown
Deroo's mouse	P. derooi (Van der Straeten & Verheyen, 1978)	Western Africa	Size: 9–14 cm (4–6 in) long, plus 10–15 cm (4–6 in) tail Habitat: Savanna Diet: Fruit, seeds, vegetation, and insects	LC Unknown
Forest soft-furred mouse	P. rostratus (Miller, 1900)	Western Africa	Size: 10–15 cm (4–6 in) long, plus 12–18 cm (5–7 in) tail Habitat: Forest Diet: Fruit, seeds, vegetation, and insects	LC Unknown
Gotel Mountain soft-furred mouse	P. obscurus Hutterer & Dieterlen, 1992	Nigeria	Size: 10–14 cm (4–6 in) long, plus 14–18 cm (6–7 in) tail Habitat: Grassland and forest Diet: Fruit, seeds, vegetation, and insects	EN Unknown
Hartwig's soft-furred mouse	P. hartwigi Eisentraut, 1968	Cameroon	Size: 11–14 cm (4–6 in) long, plus 15–18 cm (6–7 in) tail Habitat: Forest Diet: Fruit, seeds, vegetation, and insects	VU Unknown
Jackson's soft-furred mouse	P. jacksoni (De Winton, 1897)	Sub-Saharan Africa	Size: 9–14 cm (4–6 in) long, plus 12–17 cm (5–7 in) tail Habitat: Forest Diet: Fruit, seeds, vegetation, and insects	LC Unknown
Least soft-furred mouse	P. minor Hatt, 1934	Democratic Republic of the Congo and Zambia	Size: 8–12 cm (3–5 in) long, plus 10–15 cm (4–6 in) tail Habitat: Forest Diet: Fruit, seeds, vegetation, and insects	LC Unknown
Lukolela swamp rat	P. lukolelae (Hatt, 1934)	Democratic Republic of the Congo	Size: 10–15 cm (4–6 in) long, plus 11–16 cm (4–6 in) tail Habitat: Forest Diet: Fruit, seeds, vegetation, and insects	LC Unknown
Misonne's soft-furred mouse	P. misonnei Van der Straeten & Dieterlen, 1987	Democratic Republic of the Congo	Size: 8–13 cm (3–5 in) long, plus 11–17 cm (4–7 in) tail Habitat: Forest Diet: Fruit, seeds, vegetation, and insects	LC Unknown
Muton's soft-furred mouse	P. mutoni Van der Straeten & Dudu, 1990	Democratic Republic of the Congo	Size: 11–14 cm (4–6 in) long, plus 11–18 cm (4–7 in) tail Habitat: Inland wetlands and forest Diet: Fruit, seeds, vegetation, and insects	NT Unknown
Petter's soft-furred mouse	P. petteri Van der Straeten, Lecompte, & Denys, 2003	West-central Africa	Size: 9–15 cm (4–6 in) long, plus 10–17 cm (4–7 in) tail Habitat: Forest Diet: Fruit, seeds, vegetation, and insects	LC Unknown
Tullberg's soft-furred mouse	P. tullbergi (Thomas, 1888)	Western Africa	Size: 10–14 cm (4–6 in) long, plus 11–16 cm (4–6 in) tail Habitat: Forest Diet: Fruit, seeds, vegetation, and insects	LC Unknown
Verschuren's swamp rat	P. verschureni (Verheyen & Van der Straeten, 1977)	Democratic Republic of the Congo	Size: 10–14 cm (4–6 in) long, plus 12–17 cm (5–7 in) tail Habitat: Forest Diet: Fruit, seeds, vegetation, and insects	DD Unknown

Genus Protochromys – Menzies, 1996 – one species
Common name	Scientific name and subspecies	Range	Size and ecology	IUCN status and estimated population
Red-bellied mosaic-tailed rat	P. fellowsi (Hinton, 1943)	Papua New Guinea	Size: 13–18 cm (5–7 in) long, plus 18–21 cm (7–8 in) tail Habitat: Forest Diet: Fruit, berries, and other vegetation	LC Unknown

Genus Pseudohydromys – Rümmler, 1934 – twelve species
Common name	Scientific name and subspecies	Range	Size and ecology	IUCN status and estimated population
Laurie's moss mouse	P. elanorae Helgen & Helgen, 2009	Papua New Guinea	Size: 7–8 cm (3–3 in) long, plus 7–9 cm (3–4 in) tail Habitat: Forest Diet: Insects	NE Unknown
Musser's shrew mouse	P. musseri Flannery, 1989	Papua New Guinea	Size: About 11 cm (4 in) long, plus about 10 cm (4 in) tail Habitat: Forest Diet: Insects	DD Unknown
Bishop's moss mouse	P. berniceae Helgen & Helgen, 2009	Papua New Guinea	Size: 7–8 cm (3–3 in) long, plus 7–9 cm (3–4 in) tail Habitat: Forest Diet: Insects	LC Unknown
Eastern shrew mouse	P. murinus Rümmler, 1934	Papua New Guinea	Size: 7–11 cm (3–4 in) long, plus 8–11 cm (3–4 in) tail Habitat: Forest Diet: Insects	LC Unknown
German's one-toothed moss mouse	P. germani (Helgen, 2005)	Papua New Guinea	Size: 8–11 cm (3–4 in) long, plus 9–11 cm (4 in) tail Habitat: Forest Diet: Insects	DD Unknown
Huon small-toothed moss mouse	P. carlae Helgen & Helgen, 2009	Papua New Guinea	Size: 8–11 cm (3–4 in) long, plus 8–10 cm (3–4 in) tail Habitat: Forest Diet: Insects	DD Unknown
Mottled-tailed shrew mouse	P. fuscus (Laurie, 1952)	Papua New Guinea	Size: 8–11 cm (3–4 in) long, plus 7–9 cm (3–4 in) tail Habitat: Forest, shrubland, and grassland Diet: Insects	LC Unknown
One-toothed shrew mouse	P. ellermani (Laurie & Hill, 1954)	New Guinea	Size: 8–11 cm (3–4 in) long, plus 9–12 cm (4–5 in) tail Habitat: Forest Diet: Insects	LC Unknown
Southern small-toothed moss mouse	P. pumehanae Helgen & Helgen, 2009	Papua New Guinea	Size: 9–11 cm (4 in) long, plus 10–11 cm (4 in) tail Habitat: Forest Diet: Insects	DD Unknown
Western shrew mouse	P. occidentalis Tate, 1951	New Guinea	Size: 8–12 cm (3–5 in) long, plus 8–10 cm (3–4 in) tail Habitat: Forest Diet: Insects	DD Unknown
White-bellied moss mouse	P. sandrae Helgen & Helgen, 2009	Papua New Guinea	Size: About 11 cm (4 in) long, plus about 10 cm (4 in) tail Habitat: Forest Diet: Insects	LC Unknown
Woolley's moss mouse	P. patriciae Helgen & Helgen, 2009	Western New Guinea	Size: 9–10 cm (4 in) long, plus 8–9 cm (3–4 in) tail Habitat: Forest Diet: Insects	DD Unknown

Genus Pseudomys – Gray, 1832 – 23 species
Common name	Scientific name and subspecies	Range	Size and ecology	IUCN status and estimated population
Ash-grey mouse	P. albocinereus (Gould, 1845)	Western Australia	Size: 6–11 cm (2–4 in) long, plus 8–12 cm (3–5 in) tail Habitat: Shrubland Diet: Seeds, roots, other vegetation, and insects	LC Unknown
Blue-gray mouse †	P. glaucus Thomas, 1910	Eastern Australia	Size: Unknown Habitat: Forest Diet: Seeds, roots, other vegetation, and insects	EX 0
Bolam's mouse	P. bolami (Troughton, 1932)	Southern Australia	Size: 5–8 cm (2–3 in) long, plus 7–11 cm (3–4 in) tail Habitat: Shrubland and savanna Diet: Seeds, roots, other vegetation, and insects	LC Unknown
Central pebble-mound mouse	P. johnsoni Kitchener, 1985	Northern Australia	Size: 5–8 cm (2–3 in) long, plus 6–10 cm (2–4 in) tail Habitat: Grassland, forest, savanna, and shrubland Diet: Seeds, roots, other vegetation, and insects	LC Unknown
Country mouse	P. patrius (Thomas & Dollman, 1909)	Eastern Australia	Size: 5–8 cm (2–3 in) long, plus 5–9 cm (2–4 in) tail Habitat: Rocky areas, savanna, grassland, and shrubland Diet: Seeds, roots, other vegetation, and insects	LC Unknown
Desert mouse	P. desertor (Troughton, 1932)	Australia	Size: 7–11 cm (3–4 in) long, plus 8–11 cm (3–4 in) tail Habitat: Grassland, savanna, desert, and shrubland Diet: Seeds, roots, other vegetation, and insects	LC Unknown
Eastern chestnut mouse	P. gracilicaudatus (Gould, 1845)	Eastern Australia	Size: 9–15 cm (4–6 in) long, plus 7–12 cm (3–5 in) tail Habitat: Shrubland, inland wetlands, and forest Diet: Seeds, roots, other vegetation, and insects	LC Unknown
Gould's mouse	P. gouldii (Waterhouse, 1839)	Australia	Size: 8–12 cm (3–5 in) long, plus 11–13 cm (4–5 in) tail Habitat: Shrubland and forest Diet: Seeds, roots, other vegetation, and insects	VU 6,000–18,000
Hastings River mouse	P. oralis Thomas, 1921	Eastern Australia	Size: 12–16 cm (5–6 in) long, plus 11–14 cm (4–6 in) tail Habitat: Forest Diet: Seeds, roots, other vegetation, and insects	VU 5000
Heath mouse	P. shortridgei (Thomas, 1907)	Southern Australia	Size: 9–12 cm (4–5 in) long, plus 8–10 cm (3–4 in) tail Habitat: Shrubland Diet: Seeds, roots, other vegetation, and insects	EN 10,000–20,000
Kakadu pebble-mound mouse	P. calabyi Kitchener & Humphreys, 1987	Northern Australia	Size: 6–10 cm (2–4 in) long, plus 6–10 cm (2–4 in) tail Habitat: Forest and savanna Diet: Seeds, roots, other vegetation, and insects	VU 15000
Little native mouse	P. delicatulus (Gould, 1842)	Australia and Papua New Guinea	Size: 5–8 cm (2–3 in) long, plus 5–8 cm (2–3 in) tail Habitat: Grassland, savanna, and shrubland Diet: Seeds, roots, other vegetation, and insects	LC Unknown
Long-eared mouse †	P. auritus Thomas, 1910	Southern Australia	Size: Unknown Habitat: Shrubland, savanna, and forest Diet: Seeds, roots, other vegetation, and insects	EX 0
Long-tailed mouse	P. higginsi Trouessart, 1897	Southern Australia	Size: 11–15 cm (4–6 in) long, plus 14–20 cm (6–8 in) tail Habitat: Forest and rocky areas Diet: Seeds, roots, other vegetation, and insects	LC Unknown
New Holland mouse	P. novaehollandiae (Waterhouse, 1843)	Southeastern Australia	Size: 6–10 cm (2–4 in) long, plus 8–11 cm (3–4 in) tail Habitat: Shrubland and forest Diet: Seeds, roots, other vegetation, and insects	VU 8,000–50,000
Pilliga mouse	P. pilligaensis Fox & Briscoe, 1980	Eastern Australia	Size: 5–8 cm (2–3 in) long, plus 5–8 cm (2–3 in) tail Habitat: Forest and shrubland Diet: Seeds, roots, other vegetation, and insects	DD Unknown
Plains rat	P. australis Gray, 1832	Central Australia	Size: 9–15 cm (4–6 in) long, plus 8–13 cm (3–5 in) tail Habitat: Shrubland and desert Diet: Seeds, roots, other vegetation, and insects	VU 5,000–20,000
Sandy inland mouse	P. hermannsburgensis (Waite, 1896)	Australia	Size: 6–9 cm (2–4 in) long, plus 7–9 cm (3–4 in) tail Habitat: Shrubland, grassland, and desert Diet: Seeds, roots, other vegetation, and insects	LC Unknown
Silky mouse	P. apodemoides Finlayson, 1932	Southern Australia	Size: 6–10 cm (2–4 in) long, plus 9–12 cm (4–5 in) tail Habitat: Shrubland Diet: Seeds, roots, other vegetation, and insects	LC Unknown
Smoky mouse	P. fumeus Brazenor, 1934	Southern Australia	Size: 8–13 cm (3–5 in) long, plus 11–16 cm (4–6 in) tail Habitat: Forest and shrubland Diet: Seeds, roots, other vegetation, and insects	VU 5,000–50,000
Western chestnut mouse	P. nanus (Gould, 1858)	Northern Australia	Size: 7–13 cm (3–5 in) long, plus 7–13 cm (3–5 in) tail Habitat: Shrubland, grassland, and savanna Diet: Seeds, roots, other vegetation, and insects	LC Unknown
Western mouse	P. occidentalis Tate, 1951	Southwestern Australia	Size: 8–11 cm (3–4 in) long, plus 12–14 cm (5–6 in) tail Habitat: Shrubland Diet: Seeds, roots, other vegetation, and insects	NT Unknown
Western pebble-mound mouse	P. chapmani Kitchener, 1980	Western Australia	Size: 5–7 cm (2–3 in) long, plus 7–8 cm (3–3 in) tail Habitat: Grassland and shrubland Diet: Seeds, roots, other vegetation, and insects	LC Unknown

Genus Rattus – Fischer von Waldheim, 1803 – 68 species
Common name	Scientific name and subspecies	Range	Size and ecology	IUCN status and estimated population
Aceh rat	R. blangorum Miller, 1942	Indonesia	Size: 13–15 cm (5–6 in) long, plus 16–18 cm (6–7 in) tail Habitat: Forest Diet: A wide variety of plant, insects, and animals	DD Unknown
Andaman rat	R. stoicus (Miller, 1902)	Andaman Islands in India	Size: 22–26 cm (9–10 in) long, plus 19–21 cm (7–8 in) tail Habitat: Forest Diet: A wide variety of plant, insects, and animals	VU Unknown
Annandale's rat	R. annandalei (Bonhote, 1903)	Malaysia and Indonesia	Size: 17–22 cm (7–9 in) long, plus 22–26 cm (9–10 in) tail Habitat: Shrubland and forest Diet: A wide variety of plant, insects, and animals	LC Unknown
Arianus's rat	R. omichlodes Misonne, 1979	Western New Guinea	Size: 12–14 cm (5–6 in) long, plus 9–11 cm (4 in) tail Habitat: Shrubland and inland wetlands Diet: A wide variety of plant, insects, and animals	DD Unknown
Australian swamp rat	R. lutreolus (Gray, 1841)	Eastern Australia	Size: 12–20 cm (5–8 in) long, plus 8–15 cm (3–6 in) tail Habitat: Inland wetlands, shrubland, and forest Diet: A wide variety of plant, insects, and animals	LC Unknown
Black rat	R. rattus (Linnaeus, 1758)	Europe, Africa, Asia	Size: 11–26 cm (4–10 in) long, plus 12–26 cm (5–10 in) tail Habitat: Shrubland Diet: A wide variety of plant, insects, and animals	LC Unknown
Bonthain rat	R. bontanus Thomas, 1921	Sulawesi island	Size: 18–24 cm (7–9 in) long, plus 23–30 cm (9–12 in) tail Habitat: Forest Diet: A wide variety of plant, insects, and animals	LC Unknown
Brown rat	R. norvegicus (Berkenhout, 1769)	Europe and Asia	Size: 16–29 cm (6–11 in) long, plus 12–25 cm (5–10 in) tail Habitat: Diet: A wide variety of plant, insects, and animals	LC Unknown
Bulldog rat †	R. nativitatis (Thomas, 1889)	Christmas Island in Australia	Size: Unknown Habitat: Forest Diet: A wide variety of plant, insects, and animals	EX 0
Bush rat	R. fuscipes (Waterhouse, 1839) Four subspecies: R. f. assimilis; R. f. coracius; R. f. fuscipes; R. f. greyii; M. m. domesticus	Southern and eastern Australia	Size: 10–20 cm (4–8 in) long, plus 10–20 cm (4–8 in) tail Habitat: Forest, savanna, and shrubland Diet: A wide variety of plant, insects, and animals	LC Unknown
Cape York rat	R. leucopus (Gray, 1867)	Northern Australia and New Guinea	Size: 13–21 cm (5–8 in) long, plus 14–21 cm (6–8 in) tail Habitat: Forest Diet: A wide variety of plant, insects, and animals	LC Unknown
Dusky field rat	R. sordidus (Gould, 1858)	Northern Australia and New Guinea	Size: 11–21 cm (4–8 in) long, plus 10–16 cm (4–6 in) tail Habitat: Savanna, grassland, and forest Diet: A wide variety of plant, insects, and animals	LC Unknown
Dusky rat	R. colletti (Thomas, 1904)	Northern Australia	Size: 6–21 cm (2–8 in) long, plus 7–15 cm (3–6 in) tail Habitat: Grassland Diet: A wide variety of plant, insects, and animals	LC Unknown
Eastern rat	R. mordax (Thomas, 1904)	Papua New Guinea and nearby islands	Size: 14–25 cm (6–10 in) long, plus 11–20 cm (4–8 in) tail Habitat: Forest, shrubland, and savanna Diet: A wide variety of plant, insects, and animals	LC Unknown
Enggano rat	R. enganus (Miller, 1906)	Enggano Island in Indonesia	Size: About 23 cm (9 in) long, plus about 26 cm (10 in) tail Habitat: Forest Diet: A wide variety of plant, insects, and animals	DD Unknown
Giluwe rat	R. giluwensis Hill, 1960	Papua New Guinea	Size: 13–19 cm (5–7 in) long, plus 8–11 cm (3–4 in) tail Habitat: Grassland and forest Diet: A wide variety of plant, insects, and animals	LC Unknown
Glacier rat	R. richardsoni Tate, 1949	Western New Guinea	Size: 12–14 cm (5–6 in) long, plus 12–15 cm (5–6 in) tail Habitat: Shrubland, grassland, and rocky areas Diet: A wide variety of plant, insects, and animals	VU Unknown
Hainald's Flores Island Rat	R. hainaldi Kitchener, How, & Maharadatunkamsi, 1991	Flores island	Size: About 13 cm (5 in) long, plus about 16 cm (6 in) tail Habitat: Forest Diet: A wide variety of plant, insects, and animals	EN Unknown
Himalayan field rat	R. nitidus (Hodgson, 1845)	Southeastern and eastern Asia	Size: 14–18 cm (6–7 in) long, plus 13–21 cm (5–8 in) tail Habitat: Shrubland, forest, and grassland Diet: A wide variety of plant, insects, and animals	LC Unknown
Hoffmann's rat	R. hoffmanni (Matschie, 1901)	Indonesia	Size: 14–21 cm (6–8 in) long, plus 14–21 cm (6–8 in) tail Habitat: Forest and shrubland Diet: A wide variety of plant, insects, and animals	LC Unknown
Hoogerwerf's rat	R. hoogerwerfi Chasen, 1939	Indonesia	Size: 16–20 cm (6–8 in) long, plus 21–26 cm (8–10 in) tail Habitat: Forest Diet: A wide variety of plant, insects, and animals	VU Unknown
Japen rat	R. jobiensis Rümmler, 1935	Western New Guinea and nearby islands	Size: 21–25 cm (8–10 in) long, plus 18–23 cm (7–9 in) tail Habitat: Forest Diet: A wide variety of plant, insects, and animals	LC Unknown
Kerala rat	R. ranjiniae Agrawal & Ghosal, 1969	Southern India	Size: 16–26 cm (6–10 in) long, plus 18–23 cm (7–9 in) tail Habitat: Diet: A wide variety of plant, insects, and animals	EN Unknown
Koopman's rat	R. koopmani Musser & Holden, 1991	Indonesia	Size: About 23 cm (9 in) long, plus about 21 cm (8 in) tail Habitat: Unknown Diet: A wide variety of plant, insects, and animals	DD Unknown
Korinch's rat	R. korinchi (Robinson & Kloss, 1916)	Sumatra island	Size: 16–17 cm (6–7 in) long, plus 21–22 cm (8–9 in) tail Habitat: Forest Diet: A wide variety of plant, insects, and animals	DD Unknown
Large New Guinea spiny rat	R. praetor (Thomas, 1888)	New Guinea and Solomon Islands	Size: 15–24 cm (6–9 in) long, plus 14–19 cm (6–7 in) tail Habitat: Forest and grassland Diet: A wide variety of plant, insects, and animals	LC Unknown
Lesser ricefield rat	R. losea (Swinhoe, 1871)	Southeastern and eastern Asia	Size: 12–19 cm (5–7 in) long, plus 11–18 cm (4–7 in) tail Habitat: Shrubland, grassland, and forest Diet: A wide variety of plant, insects, and animals	LC Unknown
Little soft-furred rat	R. mollicomulus Tate & Archbold, 1935	Sulawesi island	Size: 15–16 cm (6 in) long, plus 14–16 cm (6 in) tail Habitat: Forest Diet: A wide variety of plant, insects, and animals	EN Unknown
Long-haired rat	R. villosissimus Waite, 1898	Australia	Size: 13–22 cm (5–9 in) long, plus 12–18 cm (5–7 in) tail Habitat: Desert and shrubland Diet: A wide variety of plant, insects, and animals	LC Unknown
Lore Lindu xanthurus rat	R. facetus Miller & Hollister, 1921	Sulawesi island	Size: 13–23 cm (5–9 in) long, plus 17–26 cm (7–10 in) tail Habitat: Forest Diet: A wide variety of plant, insects, and animals	LC Unknown
Maclear's rat †	R. macleari (Thomas, 1887)	Christmas Island in Australia	Size: Unknown Habitat: Forest Diet: A wide variety of plant, insects, and animals	EX 0
Malayan field rat	R. tiomanicus (Miller, 1900)	Southeastern Asia	Size: 14–19 cm (6–7 in) long, plus 15–20 cm (6–8 in) tail Habitat: Forest and grassland Diet: A wide variety of plant, insects, and animals	LC Unknown
Manus Island spiny rat	R. detentus Timm, Weijola, Aplin, Flannery, & Pine, 2016	Manus Island in Papua New Guinea	Size: About 26 cm (10 in) long, plus about 15 cm (6 in) tail Habitat: Diet: A wide variety of plant, insects, and animals	CR 50–250
Mentawai rat	R. lugens (Miller, 1903)	Indonesia	Size: About 23 cm (9 in) long, plus about 21 cm (8 in) tail Habitat: Forest Diet: A wide variety of plant, insects, and animals	VU Unknown
Mindoro black rat	R. mindorensis (Thomas, 1898)	Mindoro island in the Philippines.	Size: About 19 cm (7 in) long, plus about 16 cm (6 in) tail Habitat: Forest Diet: A wide variety of plant, insects, and animals	LC Unknown
Moluccan prehensile-tailed rat	R. morotaiensis Kellogg, 1945	Indonesia	Size: 12–21 cm (5–8 in) long, plus 16–22 cm (6–9 in) tail Habitat: Forest Diet: A wide variety of plant, insects, and animals	LC Unknown
Moss-forest rat	R. niobe (Thomas, 1906)	Papua New Guinea	Size: 10–14 cm (4–6 in) long, plus 11–14 cm (4–6 in) tail Habitat: Forest Diet: A wide variety of plant, insects, and animals	LC Unknown
New Guinean rat	R. novaeguineae Taylor & Calaby, 1982	Papua New Guinea	Size: 15–23 cm (6–9 in) long, plus 13–18 cm (5–7 in) tail Habitat: Forest and grassland Diet: A wide variety of plant, insects, and animals	LC Unknown
New Ireland forest rat	R. sanila Flannery & White, 1991	Papua New Guinea	Size: 14–25 cm (6–10 in) long, plus 11–20 cm (4–8 in) tail Habitat: Forest Diet: A wide variety of plant, insects, and animals	NE Unknown
Nillu rat	R. montanus Phillips, 1932	Sri Lanka	Size: 16–17 cm (6–7 in) long, plus 21–23 cm (8–9 in) tail Habitat: Forest and grassland Diet: A wide variety of plant, insects, and animals	EN Unknown
Nonsense rat	R. burrus (Miller, 1902)	Nicobar Islands in India	Size: 17–21 cm (7–8 in) long, plus 18–21 cm (7–8 in) tail Habitat: Forest Diet: A wide variety of plant, insects, and animals	EN Unknown
Opossum rat	R. marmosurus Thomas, 1921	Sulawesi island	Size: 13–23 cm (5–9 in) long, plus 17–26 cm (7–10 in) tail Habitat: Forest Diet: A wide variety of plant, insects, and animals	LC Unknown
Osgood's rat	R. osgoodi Musser & Newcomb, 1985	Southern Vietnam	Size: 12–18 cm (5–7 in) long, plus 14–17 cm (6–7 in) tail Habitat: Grassland, forest, and shrubland Diet: A wide variety of plant, insects, and animals	LC Unknown
Pale field rat	R. tunneyi Thomas, 1904	Northern and eastern Australia	Size: 11–20 cm (4–8 in) long, plus 7–19 cm (3–7 in) tail Habitat: Savanna, grassland, and shrubland Diet: A wide variety of plant, insects, and animals	LC Unknown
Palm rat	R. palmarum (Zelebor, 1869)	Nicobar islands	Size: 22–24 cm (9 in) long, plus 22–23 cm (9 in) tail Habitat: Forest Diet: A wide variety of plant, insects, and animals	VU Unknown
Peleng rat	R. pelurus Sody, 1941	Peleng island in Indonesia	Size: 24–27 cm (9–11 in) long, plus 24–28 cm (9–11 in) tail Habitat: Unknown Diet: A wide variety of plant, insects, and animals	DD Unknown
Philippine forest rat	R. everetti (Günther, 1879)	Philippines	Size: 21–24 cm (8–9 in) long, plus 18–24 cm (7–9 in) tail Habitat: Forest and shrubland Diet: A wide variety of plant, insects, and animals	LC Unknown
Pocock's highland rat	R. pococki Ellerman, 1941	New Guinea	Size: About 13 cm (5 in) long, plus about 13 cm (5 in) tail Habitat: Forest Diet: A wide variety of plant, insects, and animals	LC Unknown
Polynesian rat	R. exulans (Peale, 1848)	Southeastern Asia and Oceania	Size: 7–17 cm (3–7 in) long, plus 10–20 cm (4–8 in) tail Habitat: Intertidal marine, grassland, shrubland, forest, coastal marine, and rocky areas Diet: A wide variety of plant, insects, and animals	LC Unknown
Ricefield rat	R. argentiventer (Robinson & Kloss, 1916)	Southeastern Asia	Size: 13–23 cm (5–9 in) long, plus 14–21 cm (6–8 in) tail Habitat: Grassland Diet: A wide variety of plant, insects, and animals	LC Unknown
Sahyadris forest rat	R. satarae Hinton, 1918	Southern India	Size: 15–19 cm (6–7 in) long, plus 15–23 cm (6–9 in) tail Habitat: Forest Diet: A wide variety of plant, insects, and animals	VU Unknown
Sikkim rat	R. andamanensis (Blyth, 1860)	Southern and southeastern Asia	Size: 15–20 cm (6–8 in) long, plus 18–24 cm (7–9 in) tail Habitat: Forest Diet: A wide variety of plant, insects, and animals	LC Unknown
Simalur rat	R. simalurensis (Miller, 1903)	Indonesia	Size: 20–21 cm (8 in) long, plus 17–20 cm (7–8 in) tail Habitat: Forest Diet: A wide variety of plant, insects, and animals	EN Unknown
Slender rat	R. verecundus (Thomas, 1904)	New Guinea	Size: 12–17 cm (5–7 in) long, plus 14–18 cm (6–7 in) tail Habitat: Forest Diet: A wide variety of plant, insects, and animals	LC Unknown
Southeastern xanthurus rat	R. salocco Tate & Archbold, 1935	Sulawesi island	Size: About 21 cm (8 in) long, plus 26 cm (10 in) tail Habitat: Forest Diet: A wide variety of plant, insects, and animals	VU Unknown
Spiny Ceram rat	R. feliceus Thomas, 1920	Seram Island in Indonesia	Size: 16–28 cm (6–11 in) long, plus 16–19 cm (6–7 in) tail Habitat: Forest Diet: A wide variety of plant, insects, and animals	NT Unknown
Stein's rat	R. steini Rümmler, 1935	New Guinea	Size: 14–20 cm (6–8 in) long, plus 14–20 cm (6–8 in) tail Habitat: Forest Diet: A wide variety of plant, insects, and animals	LC Unknown
Sula rat	R. elaphinus Sody, 1941	Indonesia	Size: 12–21 cm (5–8 in) long, plus 15–20 cm (6–8 in) tail Habitat: Forest Diet: A wide variety of plant, insects, and animals	NT Unknown
Summit rat	R. baluensis (Thomas, 1894)	Eastern Malaysia	Size: 15–19 cm (6–7 in) long, plus 17–20 cm (7–8 in) tail Habitat: Shrubland and forest Diet: A wide variety of plant, insects, and animals	LC Unknown
Sunburned rat	R. adustus Sody, 1940	Enggano Island in Indonesia	Size: About 18 cm (7 in) long, plus about 15 cm (6 in) tail Habitat: Forest Diet: A wide variety of plant, insects, and animals	DD Unknown
Tanezumi rat	R. tanezumi Temminck, 1844	Southern, eastern, and southeastern Asia	Size: 10–21 cm (4–8 in) long, plus 12–23 cm (5–9 in) tail Habitat: Shrubland, grassland, and forest Diet: A wide variety of plant, insects, and animals	LC Unknown
Tawitawi forest rat	R. tawitawiensis Musser & Heaney, 1985	Tawi-Tawi Island in the Philippines	Size: 16–21 cm (6–8 in) long, plus 14–18 cm (6–7 in) tail Habitat: Unknown Diet: A wide variety of plant, insects, and animals	DD Unknown
Timor rat	R. timorensis Kitchener, Aplin, & Boeadi, 1991	Indonesia	Size: About 16 cm (6 in) long, plus about 8 cm (3 in) tail Habitat: Forest Diet: A wide variety of plant, insects, and animals	DD Unknown
Turkestan rat	R. pyctoris (Hodgson, 1845)	Central Asia	Size: 14–21 cm (6–8 in) long, plus 13–21 cm (5–8 in) tail Habitat: Forest and rocky areas Diet: A wide variety of plant, insects, and animals	LC Unknown
Van Deusen's rat	R. vandeuseni Taylor & Calaby, 1982	Papua New Guinea	Size: 12–16 cm (5–6 in) long, plus 12–16 cm (5–6 in) tail Habitat: Forest Diet: A wide variety of plant, insects, and animals	NT Unknown
Vogelkop mountain rat	R. arfakiensis Rümmler, 1935	Western New Guinea	Size: About 13 cm (5 in) long, plus about 14 cm (6 in) tail Habitat: Unknown Diet: A wide variety of plant, insects, and animals	DD Unknown
Western New Guinea mountain rat	R. arrogans Thomas, 1922	Western New Guinea	Size: About 13 cm (5 in) long, plus about 11 cm (4 in) tail Habitat: Forest, shrubland, and grassland Diet: A wide variety of plant, insects, and animals	LC Unknown
Yellow-tailed rat	R. xanthurus (Gray, 1867)	Sulawesi island	Size: 23–26 cm (9–10 in) long, plus 29–33 cm (11–13 in) tail Habitat: Forest Diet: A wide variety of plant, insects, and animals	LC Unknown

Genus Rhabdomys – Thomas, 1916 – four species
Common name	Scientific name and subspecies	Range	Size and ecology	IUCN status and estimated population
Four-striped grass mouse	R. pumilio (Sparrman, 1784)	South Africa	Size: 9–14 cm (4–6 in) long, plus 9–13 cm (4–5 in) tail Habitat: Shrubland and savanna Diet: Roots, seeds, berries, and grains, as well as insects and eggs	LC Unknown
Karoo four-striped grass rat	R. intermedius Wroughton, 1905	South Africa	Size: 9–14 cm (4–6 in) long, plus 9–13 cm (4–5 in) tail Habitat: Grassland and shrubland Diet: Roots, seeds, berries, and grains, as well as insects and eggs	LC Unknown
Mesic four-striped grass rat	R. dilectus De Winton, 1897	Scattered Sub-Saharan Africa	Size: 9–13 cm (4–5 in) long, plus 7–9 cm (3–4 in) tail Habitat: Grassland, shrubland, and savanna Diet: Roots, seeds, berries, and grains, as well as insects and eggs	LC Unknown
West-central four-striped grass rat	R. bechuanae Thomas, 1893	Southern Africa	Size: About 11 cm (4 in) long, plus 9–12 cm (4–5 in) tail Habitat: Grassland, shrubland, and savanna Diet: Roots, seeds, berries, and grains, as well as insects and eggs	LC Unknown

Genus Rhynchomys – Thomas, 1895 – four species
Common name	Scientific name and subspecies	Range	Size and ecology	IUCN status and estimated population
Banahao shrew-rat	R. banahao Balete, Rickart, Rosell-Ambal, Jansa, & Heaney, 2007	Luzon island	Size: 17–19 cm (7 in) long, plus 12–13 cm (5 in) tail Habitat: Forest Diet: Insects and worms	LC Unknown
Isarog shrew-rat	R. isarogensis Musser & Freeman, 1981	Luzon island	Size: 17–19 cm (7 in) long, plus 10–13 cm (4–5 in) tail Habitat: Forest Diet: Insects and worms	VU Unknown
Mount Data shrew-rat	R. soricoides Thomas, 1895	Luzon island	Size: 17–20 cm (7–8 in) long, plus 13–17 cm (5–7 in) tail Habitat: Forest Diet: Insects and worms	NT Unknown
Tapulao shrew-rat	R. tapulao Balete, Rickart, Rosell-Ambal, Jansa, & Heaney, 2007	Luzon island	Size: 16–19 cm (6–7 in) long, plus 12–13 cm (5 in) tail Habitat: Forest Diet: Insects and worms	DD Unknown

Genus Saxatilomys – Musser, 2005 – one species
Common name	Scientific name and subspecies	Range	Size and ecology	IUCN status and estimated population
Paulina's limestone rat	S. paulinae Musser, Smith, Robinson, & Lunde, 2005	Laos and Vietnam	Size: 15–17 cm (6–7 in) long, plus 18–20 cm (7–8 in) tail Habitat: Forest and rocky areas Diet: Plant material and invertebrates	DD Unknown

Genus Solomys – Thomas, 1922 – four species
Common name	Scientific name and subspecies	Range	Size and ecology	IUCN status and estimated population
Bougainville naked-tailed rat	S. salebrosus Troughton, 1936	Papua New Guinea and Solomon Islands	Size: 22–33 cm (9–13 in) long, plus 24–25 cm (9–10 in) tail Habitat: Forest Diet: Coconuts and nuts	VU Unknown
Isabel naked-tailed rat	S. sapientis (Thomas, 1902)	Solomon Islands	Size: 18–25 cm (7–10 in) long, plus 19–26 cm (7–10 in) tail Habitat: Forest Diet: Coconuts and nuts	EN Unknown
Poncelet's giant rat	S. ponceleti (Troughton, 1935)	Papua New Guinea and Solomon Islands	Size: About 33 cm (13 in) long, plus 34–36 cm (13–14 in) tail Habitat: Forest Diet: Coconuts and nuts	CR Unknown
Ugi naked-tailed rat	S. salamonis (Ramsay, 1883)	Solomon Islands	Size: About 22 cm (9 in) long, plus about 22 cm (9 in) tail Habitat: Unknown Diet: Coconuts and nuts	DD Unknown

Genus Sommeromys – Musser & Durden, 2002 – one species
Common name	Scientific name and subspecies	Range	Size and ecology	IUCN status and estimated population
Sommer's Sulawesi rat	S. macrorhinos Musser & Durden, 2002	Sulawesi island	Size: 9–11 cm (4 in) long, plus 17–20 cm (7–8 in) tail Habitat: Forest Diet: Plant material and invertebrates	NT Unknown

Genus Soricomys – Balete, Rickart, Heaney, Alviola, Duya, Duya, Sosa, & Jansa, 2012 – four species
Common name	Scientific name and subspecies	Range	Size and ecology	IUCN status and estimated population
Co's shrew mouse	S. leonardicoi Balete, Rickart, Heaney, Alviola, Duya, Duya, Sosa, & Jansa, 2012	Luzon island	Size: 9–12 cm (4–5 in) long, plus 8–10 cm (3–4 in) tail Habitat: Forest Diet: Worms and soft-bodied invertebrates	DD Unknown
Kalinga shrew mouse	S. kalinga Balete, Rickart, & Heaney, 2006	Luzon island (in orange)	Size: 9–11 cm (4 in) long, plus 8–11 cm (3–4 in) tail Habitat: Forest Diet: Worms and soft-bodied invertebrates	LC Unknown
Sierra Madre shrew mouse	S. musseri Rickart, Heaney, Tabaranza, & Balete, 1998	Luzon island	Size: 9–11 cm (4 in) long, plus 8–10 cm (3–4 in) tail Habitat: Forest Diet: Worms and soft-bodied invertebrates	LC Unknown
Southern Cordillera shrew mouse	S. montanus Balete, Rickart, Heaney, Alviola, Duya, Duya, Sosa, & Jansa, 2012	Luzon island	Size: 9–11 cm (4 in) long, plus 8–10 cm (3–4 in) tail Habitat: Forest Diet: Worms and soft-bodied invertebrates	LC Unknown

Genus Srilankamys – Musser, 1981 – one species
Common name	Scientific name and subspecies	Range	Size and ecology	IUCN status and estimated population
Ohiya rat	S. ohiensis (Phillips, 1929)	Sri Lanka	Size: About 15 cm (6 in) long, plus about 18 cm (7 in) tail Habitat: Forest Diet: Plant material and invertebrates	VU Unknown

Genus Stenocephalemys – Frick, 1914 – four species
Common name	Scientific name and subspecies	Range	Size and ecology	IUCN status and estimated population
Ethiopian narrow-headed rat	S. albocaudata Frick, 1914	Ethiopia	Size: 10–20 cm (4–8 in) long, plus 11–18 cm (4–7 in) tail Habitat: Shrubland and grassland Diet: Insects, leaves, and shoots	LC Unknown
Ethiopian white-footed mouse	S. albipes (Rüppell, 1842)	Ethiopia	Size: 10–18 cm (4–7 in) long, plus 13–20 cm (5–8 in) tail Habitat: Shrubland and forest Diet: Insects, leaves, and shoots	LC Unknown
Gray-tailed narrow-headed rat	S. griseicauda Petter, 1972	Ethiopia	Size: 13–18 cm (5–7 in) long, plus 10–16 cm (4–6 in) tail Habitat: Grassland and shrubland Diet: Insects, leaves, and shoots	LC Unknown
Rupp's mouse	S. ruppi (Van der Straeten & Dieterlen, 1983)	Ethiopia	Size: 12–14 cm (5–6 in) long, plus 14–18 cm (6–7 in) tail Habitat: Shrubland Diet: Insects, leaves, and shoots	DD Unknown

Genus Stochomys – Thomas, 1926 – one species
Common name	Scientific name and subspecies	Range	Size and ecology	IUCN status and estimated population
Target rat	S. longicaudatus (Tullberg, 1893)	Central Africa	Size: 10–17 cm (4–7 in) long, plus 18–23 cm (7–9 in) tail Habitat: Forest Diet: Fruit, as well as vegetation and insects	LC Unknown

Genus Sundamys – Musser & Newcomb, 1983 – three species
Common name	Scientific name and subspecies	Range	Size and ecology	IUCN status and estimated population
Bartels's rat	S. maxi (Sody, 1932)	Java island	Size: 22–27 cm (9–11 in) long, plus 26–31 cm (10–12 in) tail Habitat: Forest Diet: Fruit, leaves, shoots, insects, crabs, snails, and lizards	VU Unknown
Mountain giant Sunda rat	S. infraluteus (Thomas, 1888)	Indonesia and Malaysia	Size: 23–28 cm (9–11 in) long, plus 29–34 cm (11–13 in) tail Habitat: Forest Diet: Fruit, leaves, shoots, insects, crabs, snails, and lizards	LC Unknown
Müller's giant Sunda rat	S. muelleri (Jentink, 1879)	Southeastern Asia	Size: 18–30 cm (7–12 in) long, plus 21–37 cm (8–15 in) tail Habitat: Forest and shrubland Diet: Fruit, leaves, shoots, insects, crabs, snails, and lizards	LC Unknown

Genus Taeromys – Sody, 1841 – eight species
Common name	Scientific name and subspecies	Range	Size and ecology	IUCN status and estimated population
Celebes rat	T. celebensis (Gray, 1867)	Sulawesi island	Size: 20–25 cm (8–10 in) long, plus 24–31 cm (9–12 in) tail Habitat: Forest Diet: Fruit, leaves, and insects	LC Unknown
Giant Sulawesi rat	T. dominator Thomas, 1921	Sulawesi island	Size: 20–28 cm (8–11 in) long, plus 24–33 cm (9–13 in) tail Habitat: Forest Diet: Fruit	LC Unknown
Lovely-haired rat	T. callitrichus (Jentink, 1878)	Sulawesi island	Size: 20–24 cm (8–9 in) long, plus 22–26 cm (9–10 in) tail Habitat: Forest Diet: Fruit, leaves, and insects	LC Unknown
Salokko rat	T. arcuatus (Tate & Archbold, 1935)	Sulawesi island	Size: 20–21 cm (8 in) long, plus 20–23 cm (8–9 in) tail Habitat: Forest Diet: Fruit, leaves, and insects	VU Unknown
Small-eared rat	T. microbullatus (Tate & Archbold, 1935)	Sulawesi island	Size: About 20 cm (8 in) long, plus about 22 cm (9 in) tail Habitat: Forest Diet: Fruit, leaves, and insects	VU Unknown
Sulawesi forest rat	T. punicans (Miller & Hollister, 1921)	Sulawesi island	Size: 18–21 cm (7–8 in) long, plus 15–19 cm (6–7 in) tail Habitat: Forest Diet: Fruit, leaves, and insects	VU Unknown
Sulawesi montane rat	T. hamatus (Miller & Hollister, 1921)	Sulawesi island	Size: 18–21 cm (7–8 in) long, plus 17–20 cm (7–8 in) tail Habitat: Forest Diet: Fruit	NT Unknown
Tondano rat	T. taerae (Sody, 1932)	Sulawesi island	Size: 19–22 cm (7–9 in) long, plus 20–23 cm (8–9 in) tail Habitat: Forest Diet: Fruit, leaves, and insects	LC Unknown

Genus Tarsomys – Mearns, 1905 – two species
Common name	Scientific name and subspecies	Range	Size and ecology	IUCN status and estimated population
Long-footed rat	T. apoensis Mearns, 1905	Mindanao island	Size: 13–16 cm (5–6 in) long, plus 11–13 cm (4–5 in) tail Habitat: Forest Diet: Invertebrates	LC Unknown
Spiny long-footed rat	T. echinatus Musser & Heaney, 1992	Mindanao island	Size: 14–18 cm (6–7 in) long, plus 12–16 cm (5–6 in) tail Habitat: Forest Diet: Invertebrates	VU Unknown

Genus Tateomys – Musser, 1969 – two species
Common name	Scientific name and subspecies	Range	Size and ecology	IUCN status and estimated population
Long-tailed shrew rat	T. macrocercus Musser, 1982	Sulawesi island	Size: 11–12 cm (4–5 in) long, plus 16–18 cm (6–7 in) tail Habitat: Forest Diet: Worms	NT Unknown
Tate's shrew rat	T. rhinogradoides Musser, 1969	Sulawesi island	Size: 13–16 cm (5–6 in) long, plus 15–17 cm (6–7 in) tail Habitat: Forest Diet: Worms	LC Unknown

Genus Thallomys – Thomas, 1920 – four species
Common name	Scientific name and subspecies	Range	Size and ecology	IUCN status and estimated population
Acacia rat	T. paedulcus (Sundevall, 1846)	Sub-Saharan Africa	Size: About 13 cm (5 in) long, plus 12–19 cm (5–7 in) tail Habitat: Shrubland Diet: Buds, leaves, and seeds, as well as berries, roots, and insects	LC Unknown
Black-tailed tree rat	T. nigricauda Thomas, 1882	Southwestern Africa	Size: 11–17 cm (4–7 in) long, plus 12–20 cm (5–8 in) tail Habitat: Shrubland Diet: Buds, leaves, and seeds, as well as berries, roots, and insects	LC Unknown
Loring's rat	T. loringi (Heller, 1909)	Kenya and Tanzania	Size: 13–16 cm (5–6 in) long, plus 12–19 cm (5–7 in) tail Habitat: Savanna, shrubland, and forest Diet: Buds, leaves, and seeds, as well as berries, roots, and insects	LC Unknown
Shortridge's rat	T. shortridgei Thomas & Hinton, 1923	South Africa	Size: 14–15 cm (6 in) long, plus 18–21 cm (7–8 in) tail Habitat: Savanna Diet: Buds, leaves, and seeds, as well as berries, roots, and insects	DD Unknown

Genus Thamnomys – Thomas, 1907 – four species
Common name	Scientific name and subspecies	Range	Size and ecology	IUCN status and estimated population
Charming thicket rat	T. venustus Thomas, 1907	Central Africa	Size: 14–16 cm (6 in) long, plus 18–21 cm (7–8 in) tail Habitat: Forest Diet: Leaves and seeds	LC Unknown
Hatt's thicket rat	T. major (Hatt, 1934)	East-central Africa	Size: About 16 cm (6 in) long, plus about 20 cm (8 in) tail Habitat: Forest Diet: Leaves and seeds	NE Unknown
Kemp's thicket rat	T. kempi Dollman, 1911	Central Africa	Size: 13–18 cm (5–7 in) long, plus 17–23 cm (7–9 in) tail Habitat: Forest Diet: Leaves and seeds	VU Unknown
Schouteden's thicket rat	T. schoutedeni Hatt, 1934	Democratic Republic of the Congo	Size: 11–13 cm (4–5 in) long, plus 17–20 cm (7–8 in) tail Habitat: Forest Diet: Leaves and seeds	DD Unknown

Genus Tokudaia – Kuroda, 1943 – three species
Common name	Scientific name and subspecies	Range	Size and ecology	IUCN status and estimated population
Muennink's spiny rat	T. muenninki (Johnson, 1946)	Okinawa Island in Japan	Size: 11–18 cm (4–7 in) long, plus 9–14 cm (4–6 in) tail Habitat: Forest Diet: Plant material and invertebrates	CR Unknown
Ryukyu spiny rat	T. osimensis (Abe, 1933)	Amami Ōshima island in Japan	Size: 10–16 cm (4–6 in) long, plus 8–14 cm (3–6 in) tail Habitat: Forest Diet: Plant material and invertebrates	EN Unknown
Tokunoshima spiny rat	T. tokunoshimensis Endō & Tsuchiya, 2006	Tokunoshima island in Japan	Size: 10–16 cm (4–6 in) long, plus 8–14 cm (3–6 in) tail Habitat: Forest Diet: Plant material and invertebrates	EN Unknown

Genus Tonkinomys – Musser, Lunde, & Son, 2006 – one species
Common name	Scientific name and subspecies	Range	Size and ecology	IUCN status and estimated population
Daovantien's limestone rat	T. daovantieni Musser, Lunde, & Son, 2006	Vietnam	Size: 18–22 cm (7–9 in) long, plus 15–19 cm (6–7 in) tail Habitat: Forest, inland wetlands, and rocky areas Diet: Plant material and invertebrates	DD Unknown

Genus Tryphomys – Miller, 1910 – one species
Common name	Scientific name and subspecies	Range	Size and ecology	IUCN status and estimated population
Luzon short-nosed rat	T. adustus Miller, 1910	Luzon island	Size: 17–20 cm (7–8 in) long, plus 15–19 cm (6–7 in) tail Habitat: Forest and grassland Diet: Plant material and invertebrates	DD Unknown

Genus Uromys – Peters, 1867 – eleven species
Common name	Scientific name and subspecies	Range	Size and ecology	IUCN status and estimated population
Biak giant rat	U. boeadii Groves & Flannery, 1994	Biak island in Indonesia	Size: About 25 cm (10 in) long, plus about 23 cm (9 in) tail Habitat: Forest Diet: Coconuts, nuts, fruit, and flowers	CR Unknown
Bismarck giant rat	U. neobritannicus Tate & Archbold, 1935	Papua New Guinea	Size: 25–30 cm (10–12 in) long, plus 24–28 cm (9–11 in) tail Habitat: Forest Diet: Coconuts, nuts, fruit, and flowers	NT Unknown
Emma's giant rat	U. emmae Groves & Flannery, 1994	Owi island in Indonesia	Size: About 23 cm (9 in) long, plus about 26 cm (10 in) tail Habitat: Forest and unknown Diet: Coconuts, nuts, fruit, and flowers	CR Unknown
Emperor rat	U. imperator (Thomas, 1888)	Solomon Islands	Size: 34–35 cm (13–14 in) long, plus 25–26 cm (10 in) tail Habitat: Forest Diet: Coconuts, nuts, fruit, and flowers	CR 3
Giant naked-tailed rat	U. anak Thomas, 1907	New Guinea	Size: 27–33 cm (11–13 in) long, plus 29–40 cm (11–16 in) tail Habitat: Forest and caves Diet: Coconuts, nuts, fruit, and flowers	LC Unknown
Giant white-tailed rat	U. caudimaculatus (Krefft, 1867)	Northern Australia, and New Guinea and nearby islands	Size: 20–38 cm (8–15 in) long, plus 21–36 cm (8–14 in) tail Habitat: Forest and inland wetlands Diet: Coconuts, nuts, fruit, and flowers	LC Unknown
Great Key Island giant rat	U. siebersi Thomas, 1923	Kai Besar island in Indonesia	Size: 25–28 cm (10–11 in) long, plus 22–23 cm (9 in) tail Habitat: Forest Diet: Coconuts, nuts, fruit, and flowers	DD Unknown
Guadalcanal rat	U. porculus Thomas, 1904	Solomon Islands	Size: About 22 cm (9 in) long, plus about 13 cm (5 in) tail Habitat: Forest Diet: Coconuts, nuts, fruit, and flowers	CR 3
King rat	U. rex (Thomas, 1888)	Solomon Islands	Size: 26–29 cm (10–11 in) long, plus 23–30 cm (9–12 in) tail Habitat: Forest Diet: Coconuts, nuts, fruit, and flowers	EN Unknown
Masked white-tailed rat	U. hadrourus (Winter, 1983)	Northern Australia	Size: 17–18 cm (7 in) long, plus 18–20 cm (7–8 in) tail Habitat: Forest Diet: Coconuts, nuts, fruit, and flowers	NT 20,000
Vangunu giant rat	U. vika Lavery & Judge, 2017	Solomon Islands	Size: Unknown Habitat: Forest Diet: Coconuts, nuts, fruit, and flowers	CR Unknown

Genus Vandeleuria – Gray, 1842 – three species
Common name	Scientific name and subspecies	Range	Size and ecology	IUCN status and estimated population
Asiatic long-tailed climbing mouse	V. oleracea (Bennett, 1832)	Southern and southeastern Asia	Size: About 7 cm (3 in) long, plus about 11 cm (4 in) tail Habitat: Shrubland, grassland, and forest Diet: Fruit, buds, and shoots	LC Unknown
Nilgiri long-tailed tree mouse	V. nilagirica Jerdon, 1867	Southern India	Size: About 11 cm (4 in) long, plus about 14 cm (6 in) tail Habitat: Forest Diet: Fruit, buds, and shoots	EN Unknown
Nolthenius's long-tailed climbing mouse	V. nolthenii Phillips, 1929	Sri Lanka	Size: 12–13 cm (5 in) long, plus 12–13 cm (5 in) tail Habitat: Forest Diet: Fruit, buds, and shoots	EN Unknown

Genus Vernaya – Anthony, 1941 – one species
Common name	Scientific name and subspecies	Range	Size and ecology	IUCN status and estimated population
Red climbing mouse	V. fulva Allen, 1927	China	Size: 5–8 cm (2–3 in) long, plus 10–14 cm (4–6 in) tail Habitat: Forest Diet: Plant material and invertebrates	LC Unknown

Genus Waiomys – Rowe, Achmadi, & Esselstyn, 2014 – one species
Common name	Scientific name and subspecies	Range	Size and ecology	IUCN status and estimated population
Sulawesi water rat	W. mamasae Rowe, Achmadi, & Esselstyn, 2014	Sulawesi island	Size: About 13 cm (5 in) long, plus about 16 cm (6 in) tail Habitat: Forest and inland wetlands Diet: Plant material and invertebrates	DD Unknown

Genus Xenuromys – Tate & Archbold, 1941 – one species
Common name	Scientific name and subspecies	Range	Size and ecology	IUCN status and estimated population
Mimic tree rat	X. barbatus (A. Milne-Edwards, 1900)	New Guinea	Size: 27–34 cm (11–13 in) long, plus 22–28 cm (9–11 in) tail Habitat: Forest and rocky areas Diet: Fruit, seeds, and insects	LC Unknown

Genus Xeromys – Thomas, 1889 – one species
Common name	Scientific name and subspecies	Range	Size and ecology	IUCN status and estimated population
Water mouse	X. myoides Thomas, 1889	Papua New Guinea and northern and eastern Australia	Size: 7–13 cm (3–5 in) long, plus 6–10 cm (2–4 in) tail Habitat: Intertidal marine, inland wetlands, coastal marine, and forest Diet: Insects, fish, lizards, and crabs	VU 5,000–50,000

Genus Zelotomys – Osgood, 1910 – two species
Common name	Scientific name and subspecies	Range	Size and ecology	IUCN status and estimated population
Hildegarde's broad-headed mouse	Z. hildegardeae (Thomas, 1902)	Central Africa	Size: 10–13 cm (4–5 in) long, plus 8–11 cm (3–4 in) tail Habitat: Grassland, savanna, forest, and inland wetlands Diet: Grain, as well as insects	LC Unknown
Woosnam's broad-headed mouse	Z. woosnami (Schwann, 1906)	Southern Africa	Size: 9–16 cm (4–6 in) long, plus 7–14 cm (3–6 in) tail Habitat: Savanna Diet: Grain, as well as insects	LC Unknown

Genus Zyzomys – Thomas, 1909 – five species
Common name	Scientific name and subspecies	Range	Size and ecology	IUCN status and estimated population
Arnhem Land rock rat	Z. maini Kitchener, 1989	Northern Australia	Size: 11–17 cm (4–7 in) long, plus 11–15 cm (4–6 in) tail Habitat: Rocky areas and forest Diet: Fruit, seeds, other vegetation, and insects	VU 20,000
Carpentarian rock rat	Z. palatilis Kitchener, 1989	Northern Australia	Size: 9–15 cm (4–6 in) long, plus 10–16 cm (4–6 in) tail Habitat: Forest and rocky areas Diet: Fruit, seeds, other vegetation, and insects	CR 1,000
Central rock rat	Z. pedunculatus (Waite, 1896)	Central Australia	Size: 10–14 cm (4–6 in) long, plus 11–14 cm (4–6 in) tail Habitat: Shrubland, rocky areas, savanna, and grassland Diet: Fruit, seeds, other vegetation, and insects	CR 800
Common rock rat	Z. argurus (Thomas, 1889)	Australia	Size: 8–13 cm (3–5 in) long, plus 9–13 cm (4–5 in) tail Habitat: Savanna, rocky areas, and forest Diet: Fruit, seeds, other vegetation, and insects	LC Unknown
Kimberley rock rat	Z. woodwardi (Thomas, 1909)	Northwestern Australia	Size: 12–17 cm (5–7 in) long, plus 11–13 cm (4–5 in) tail Habitat: Forest, savanna, and rocky areas Diet: Fruit, seeds, other vegetation, and insects	LC Unknown

== Sources ==
- Chernasky, Amy; Motis, Anna; Burgin, Connor, eds. (2023). All the Mammals of the World. Lynx Nature Books. ISBN 978-84-16728-66-4.
- Nowak, Ronald M. (1999). Walker's Mammals of the World. Vol. 2 (6th ed.). Johns Hopkins University Press. ISBN 978-0-8018-5789-8.
- Musser, Guy G.; Carleton, Michael D. (2005). Wilson, Don E.; Reeder, DeeAnn M. (eds.). Mammal Species of the World. Vol. 2 (3rd ed.). Johns Hopkins University Press. ISBN 978-0-8018-8221-0.
