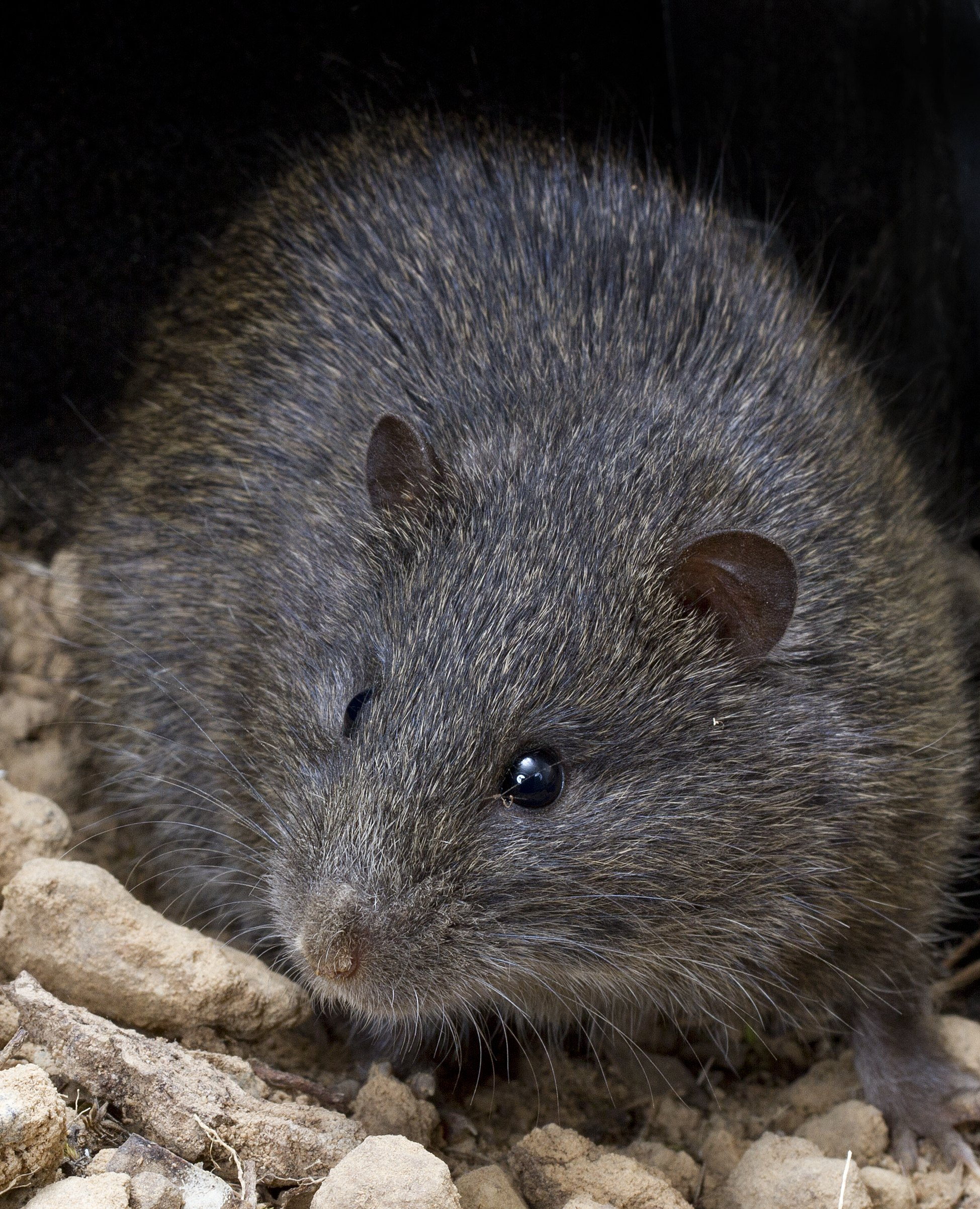
- Australian swamp rat (Rattus lutreolus)

Scientific classification
- Kingdom: Animalia
- Phylum: Chordata
- Class: Mammalia
- Order: Rodentia
- Family: Muridae
- Subfamily: Murinae
- Tribe: Rattini; Burnett, 1830

Genera
- See text

= Rattini =

Rattini Temporal range: Early Pliocene - Recent

Tribe of mammals

Rattini is a very large, diverse tribe of muroid rodents in the subfamily Murinae. They are found throughout Asia and Australasia, with a few species ranging into Europe and northern Africa. The most well-known members of this group are the true rats (genus Rattus), several species of which have been introduced worldwide.

== Taxonomy ==
They are thought to be the second-most basal member of the Murinae despite their high modern diversity, with only the Phloeomyini being more basal than them.

The genus Micromys was previously classified in a polyphyletic division also containing Hapalomys, Chiropodomys, and Vandeleuria, but phylogenetic evidence supports it forming a sister group to the rest of the Rattini. It has been debated over whether it represents its own tribe (Micromyini) or a basal member of the Rattini, but the American Society of Mammalogists classifies it within the Rattini based on a 2019 study.

== Distribution ==
They are mostly found throughout Asia, primarily in the tropics and subtropics, but with a few genera such as Rattus, Micromys (if considered a part of Rattini) and Nesokia ranging north to temperate regions or west to arid regions. In addition, many species in the genus Rattus are found throughout New Guinea and Australia, making them the only native rodents to the region outside of the Hydromyini. Only one species (Micromys minutus, if included) ranges throughout Europe, and another (Nesokia indica) ranges into northern Egypt. Several Rattus species have also been introduced worldwide, and in some cases have become invasive species that have led to the extinction of many animals and plants.

Within Asia, the Rattini reach their highest diversity in the tropics of Southeast Asia, especially in the Philippines and the Indonesian island of Sulawesi.

== Species ==
Species in the tribe include:

- Berylmys division
  - Genus Berylmys - white-toothed rats
    - Small white-toothed rat, Berylmys berdmorei
    - Bower's white-toothed rat, Berylmys bowersi
    - Kenneth's white-toothed rat, Berylmys mackenziei
    - Manipur white-toothed rat, Berylmys manipulus
- Bunomys division
  - Genus Bullimus
    - Bagobo rat, Bullimus bagobus
    - Camiguin forest rat, Bullimus gamay
    - Large Luzon forest rat, Bullimus luzonicus
  - Genus Bunomys
    - Andrew's hill rat, Bunomys andrewsi
    - Yellow-haired hill rat, Bunomys chrysocomus
    - Heavenly hill rat, Bunomys coelestis
    - Fraternal hill rat, Bunomys fratrorum
    - Karoko hill rat, Bunomys karokophilus
    - Inland hill rat, Bunomys penitus
    - Long-headed hill rat, Bunomys prolatus
    - Tana Toraja hill rat, Bunomys torajae
  - Genus Eropeplus (Sulawesian soft-furred rat)
    - Sulawesi soft-furred rat, Eropeplus canus
  - Genus Halmaheramys
    - Spiny Boki Mekot rat, Halmaheramys bokimekot
    - Wallace's large spiny rat, Halmaheramys wallacei
  - Genus Komodomys
    - Komodo rat, Komodomys rintjanus
  - Genus Lenomys (trefoil-toothed rat)
    - Trefoil-toothed giant rat, Lenomys meyeri
  - Genus Papagomys - Flores giant rats
    - Flores giant rat, Papagomys armandvillei
    - Verhoeven's giant tree rat, Papagomys theodorverhoeveni †
  - Genus Paruromys (Sulawesian giant rat)
    - Sulawesi giant rat, Paruromys dominator
  - Genus Paulamys
    - Flores long-nosed rat, Paulamys naso
  - Undescribed genus
    - Timor rat, "Rattus timorensis"
  - Genus Sundamys - giant Sunda rats
    - Annandale's rat, Sundamys annandalei
    - Mountain giant Sunda rat, Sundamys infraluteus
    - Bartels's rat, Sundamys maxi
    - Müller's giant Sunda rat, Sundamys muelleri
  - Genus Taeromys
    - Salokko rat, Taeromys arcuatus
    - Lovely-haired rat, Taeromys callitrichus
    - Celebes rat, Taeromys celebensis
    - Sulawesi montane rat, Taeromys hamatus
    - Small-eared rat, Taeromys microbullatus
    - Sulawesi forest rat, Taeromys punicans
    - Tondano rat, Taeromys taerae
- Dacnomys division
  - Genus Chiromyscus (Fea's tree rat)
    - Fea's tree rat, Chiromyscus chiropus
  - Genus Dacnomys (Large-toothed giant rat)
    - Millard's rat, Dacnomys millardi
  - Genus Lenothrix (Grey Tree Rat)
    - Gray tree rat, Lenothrix canus
  - Genus Leopoldamys - long-tailed giant rats
    - Sundaic mountain leopoldamys or Sundaic Mountain long-tailed giant rat, Leopoldamys ciliatus
    - Edwards's long-tailed giant rat, Leopoldamys edwardsi
    - Millet's long-tailed giant rat, Leopoldamys milleti
    - Neill's long-tailed giant rat, Leopoldamys neilli
    - Long-tailed giant rat, Leopoldamys sabanus
    - Mentawai long-tailed giant rat, Leopoldamys siporanus
  - Genus Margaretamys - margareta rats
    - Beccari's margareta rat, Margaretamys beccarii
    - Christine's margareta rat, Margaretamys christinae
    - Elegant margareta rat, Margaretamys elegans
    - Little margareta rat, Margaretamys parvus
  - Genus Niviventer - white-bellied rats
    - Anderson's white-bellied rat, Niviventer andersoni
    - Brahma white-bellied rat, Niviventer brahma
    - Cameron Highlands white-bellied rat, Niviventer cameroni
    - Chinese white-bellied rat, Niviventer confucianus
    - Coxing's white-bellied rat, Niviventer coninga
    - Dark-tailed tree rat, Niviventer cremoriventer
    - Oldfield white-bellied rat, Niviventer culturatus
    - Smoke-bellied rat, Niviventer eha
    - Large white-bellied rat, Niviventer excelsior
    - Montane Sumatran white-bellied rat, Niviventer fraternus
    - Chestnut white-bellied rat, Niviventer fulvescens
    - Limestone rat, Niviventer hinpoon
    - Lang Bian white-bellied rat, Niviventer langbianis
    - Narrow-tailed white-bellied rat, Niviventer lepturus
    - Hainan white-bellied rat, Niviventer lotipes (formerly in N. tenaster)
    - White-bellied rat, Niviventer niviventer
    - Long-tailed mountain rat, Niviventer rapit
    - Tenasserim white-bellied rat, Niviventer tenaster
  - Genus Saxatilomys
    - Paulina’s limestone rat, Saxatilomys paulinae
  - Genus Tonkinomys
    - Daovantien’s limestone rat, Tonkinomys daovantieni
- Echiothrix division
  - Genus Echiothrix
    - Central Sulawesi echiothrix, Echiothrix centrosa
    - Northern Sulawesi echiothrix, Echiothrix leucura
  - Genus Gracilimus
    - Sulawesi root rat, Gracilimus radix
  - Genus Hyorhinomys
    - Hog-nosed shrew rat, Hyorhinomys stuempkei
  - Genus Melasmothrix (Lesser Sulawesian Shrew Rat)
    - Sulawesian shrew rat, Melasmothrix naso
  - Genus Paucidentomys
    - Edented Sulawesi rat, Paucidentomys vermidax
  - Genus Sommeromys
    - Sommer's Sulawesi rat, Sommeromys macrorhinos
  - Genus Tateomys - greater Sulawesian shrew rats
    - Long-tailed shrew rat, Tateomys macrocercus
    - Tate's shrew rat, Tateomys rhinogradoides
  - Genus Waiomys
    - Sulawesi water rat, Waiomys mamasae
- Maxomys division
  - Genus Crunomys - Philippine and Sulawesian shrew rats
    - Celebes shrew-rat, Crunomys celebensis
    - Northern Luzon shrew-rat, Crunomys fallax
    - Mindanao shrew-rat, Crunomys melanius
    - Katanglad shrew-mouse, Crunomys suncoides
  - Genus Maxomys (rajah rats)
    - Mountain spiny rat, Maxomys alticola
    - Maxomys baeodon
    - Bartels's spiny rat, Maxomys bartelsii
    - Dollman's spiny rat, Maxomys dollmani
    - Hellwald's spiny rat, Maxomys hellwaldii
    - Sumatran spiny rat, Maxomys hylomyoides
    - Malayan mountain spiny rat, Maxomys inas
    - Fat-nosed spiny rat, Maxomys inflatus
    - Mo's spiny rat, Maxomys moi
    - Musschenbroek's spiny rat, Maxomys musschenbroekii
    - Chestnut-bellied spiny rat, Maxomys ochraceiventer
    - Pagai spiny rat, Maxomys pagensis
    - Palawan spiny rat, Maxomys panglima
    - Rajah spiny rat, Maxomys rajah
    - Red spiny rat, Maxomys surifer
    - Watts's spiny rat, Maxomys wattsi
    - Whitehead's spiny rat, Maxomys whiteheadi
- Micromys division (alternately considered a distinct tribe, Micromyini)
  - Genus Micromys
    - Indochinese harvest mouse, Micromys erythrotis
    - Eurasian harvest mouse, Micromys minutus
- Rattus division
  - Genus Abditomys
    - Luzon broad-toothed rat, Abditomys latidens
  - Genus Baletemys
    - Kampalili shrew-mouse, Baletemys kampalili
  - Genus Bandicota - bandicoot rats
    - Lesser bandicoot rat, Bandicota bengalensis
    - Greater bandicoot rat, Bandicota indica
    - Savile's bandicoot rat, Bandicota savilei
  - Genus Diplothrix
    - Ryukyu long-tailed giant rat, Diplothrix legatus
  - Genus Kadarsanomys
    - Sody's tree rat, Kadarsanomys sodyi
  - Genus Limnomys
    - Gray-bellied mountain rat, Limnomys bryophilus
    - Mindanao mountain rat, Limnomys sibuanus
  - Genus Nesokia (Short-tailed Bandicoot Rat)
    - Bunn's short-tailed bandicoot rat, Nesokia bunnii
    - Short-tailed bandicoot rat, Nesokia indica
  - Genus Nesoromys
    - Ceram rat, Nesoromys ceramicus
  - Genus Palawanomys (Palawan rat)
    - Palawan soft-furred mountain rat, Palawanomys furvus
  - Genus Rattus - typical rats
    - incertae sedis
      - Enggano rat, Rattus enganus
      - Philippine forest rat, Rattus everetti
      - Polynesian rat, Rattus exulans
      - Hainald's rat, Rattus hainaldi
      - Hoogerwerf's rat, Rattus hoogerwerfi
      - Korinch's rat, Rattus korinchi
      - † Maclear's rat, Rattus macleari
      - Nillu rat, Rattus montanus
      - Molaccan prehensile-tailed rat, Rattus morotaiensis
      - † Bulldog rat, Rattus nativitatis
      - Kerala rat, Rattus ranjiniae
      - New Ireland forest rat, Rattus sanila
      - Andaman rat, Rattus stoicus
    - R. norvegicus group
      - Himalayan field rat, Rattus nitidus
      - Brown rat or Norway rat, Rattus norvegicus
      - Turkestan rat, Rattus pyctoris
    - R. rattus group
      - Sunburned rat, Rattus adustus
      - Sikkim rat, Rattus andamanensis
      - Ricefield rat, Rattus argentiventer
      - Summit rat, Rattus baluensis
      - Aceh rat, Rattus blangorum
      - Nonsense rat, Rattus burrus
      - Hoffmann's rat, Rattus hoffmanni
      - Koopman's rat, Rattus koopmani
      - Lesser ricefield rat, Rattus losea
      - Mentawai rat, Rattus lugens
      - Mindoro black rat, Rattus mindorensis
      - Little soft-furred rat, Rattus mollicomulus
      - Osgood's rat, Rattus osgoodi
      - Palm rat, Rattus palmarum
      - Black rat, Rattus rattus
      - Little Indochinese field rat, Rattus sakeratensis
      - Sahyadris forest rat, Rattus satarae
      - Simalur rat, Rattus simalurensis
      - Tanezumi rat, Rattus tanezumi
      - Tawitawi forest rat, Rattus tawitawiensis
      - Malayan field rat, Rattus tiomanicus
    - R. xanthurus group
      - Bonthain rat, Rattus bontanus; obs. Rattus foramineus
      - Lore Lindu xanthurus rat, Rattus facetus
      - Opossum rat, Rattus marmosurus
      - Peleng rat, Rattus pelurus
      - Southeastern xanthurus rat, Rattus salocco
      - Yellow-tailed rat, Rattus xanthurus
    - R. leucopus group (New Guinean group)
      - Vogelkop mountain rat, Rattus arfakiensis
      - Western New Guinea mountain rat, Rattus arrogans
      - Manus Island spiny rat, Rattus detentus
      - Sula rat, Rattus elaphinus
      - Spiny Ceram rat, Rattus feliceus
      - Giluwe rat, Rattus giluwensis
      - Japen rat, Rattus jobiensis
      - Cape York rat, Rattus leucopus
      - Eastern rat, Rattus mordax
      - Gag Island rat, Rattus nikenii
      - Moss-forest rat, Rattus niobe
      - New Guinean rat, Rattus novaeguineae
      - Arianus's rat, Rattus omichlodes
      - Pocock’s highland rat, Rattus pococki
      - Large New Guinea spiny rat, Rattus praetor
      - Glacier rat, Rattus richardsoni
      - Stein's rat, Rattus steini
      - Van Deusen's rat, Rattus vandeuseni
      - Slender rat, Rattus verecundus
    - R. fuscipes group (Australian group)
      - Dusky rat, Rattus colletti
      - Bush rat, Rattus fuscipes
      - Australian swamp rat, Rattus lutreolus
      - Dusky field rat, Rattus sordidus
      - Pale field rat, Rattus tunneyi
      - Long-haired rat, Rattus villosissimus
  - Genus Tarsomys
    - Long-footed rat, Tarsomys apoensis
    - Spiny long-footed rat, Tarsomys echinatus
  - Genus Tryphomys (Mearn's Luzon Rat)
    - Luzon short-nosed rat, Tryphomys adustus
- Srilankamys division
  - Genus Srilankamys (Ceylonese rats)
    - Ohiya rat, Srilankamys ohiensis
- Unknown division
  - Genus Anonymomys (Mindoro rat)
    - Mindoro climbing rat, Anonymomys mindorensis
