= List of endemic mammals of India =

India is home to more than 40 endemic mammals.[1]

Most of India’s endemic mammals are restricted to specialized habitats such as the Western Ghats, Andaman and Nicobar Islands, and isolated forest fragments.

== Endemic mammals ==
Most endemic mammals are small or habitat‐specialist species that are rarely seen.

Low vulnerability

Least concern
Near threatened

Threatened

Vulnerable
Endangered

=== Order Primates: primates ===
Name	Species authority	Red List
Family Cercopithecidae: Old World monkeys
Lion-tailed macaque	Macaca silenus (Linnaeus, 1758)	
Bonnet macaque	Macaca radiata (É. Geoffroy, 1812)	
Nilgiri langur	Trachypithecus johnii (Fischer, 1829)	
Southern plains gray langur	Semnopithecus dussumieri (I. Geoffroy, 1843)	
Black-footed gray langur	Semnopithecus hypoleucos (Blyth, 1841)	

=== Order Rodentia: rodents ===
Name	Species authority	Red List
Family Muridae: mice and rats
Elvira rat	Cremnomys elvira (Ellerman, 1946)	
Manipur bush rat	Hadromys humei (Thomas, 1886)	
Kondana soft-furred rat	Millardia kondana (Mishra & Dhanda, 1975)	
Servent mouse	Mus famulus (Bonhote, 1898)	
Phillips's mouse	Mus phillipsi (Agrawal, 1977)	
Flat-haired mouse	Mus platythrix (Bennett, 1832)	
Nicobar rat	Rattus burrus (Miller, 1902)	
Car Nicobar rat	Rattus palmarum (Zelebor, 1869)	
Kerala rat	Rattus ranjiniae (Agrawal & Ghosal, 1969)	
Sahyadris forest rat	Rattus satarae (Hinton, 1918)	
Andaman rat	Rattus stoicus (Miller, 1902)	
Nilgiri long-tailed tree mouse	Vandeleuria nilagiricus (Jerdon, 1867)	
Family Platacanthomyidae: spiny dormice
Malabar spiny dormouse	Platacanthomys lasiurus (Gray, 1842)	

Family Sciuridae: squirrels
Jungle palm squirrel	Funambulus tristriatus (Waterhouse, 1837)
Nilgiri striped squirrel	Funambulus sublineatus (Waterhouse, 1837)
Indian giant squirrel	Ratufa indica (Erxleben, 1777)
Mechuka giant flying squirrel	Petaurista mechukaensis (Choudhury, 2009)
Mishmi giant flying squirrel	Petaurista mishmiensis (Choudhury, 2009)
Mebo giant flying squirrel	Petaurista siangensis (Choudhury, 2013)
Namdapha flying squirrel	Biswamoyopterus biswasi (Saha, 1981)

=== Order Scandentia: treeshrews ===
Name	Species authority	Red List
Family Tupaiidae: treeshrews
Madras treeshrew	Anathana ellioti (Waterhouse, 1838)	
Nicobar treeshrew	Tupaia nicobarica (Miller, 1902)	

=== Order Chiroptera: bats ===
Name	Species authority	Red List
Family Pteropodidae: fruit bats
Nicobar flying fox	Pteropus faunulus (Miller, 1902)	
Family Hipposideridae: leaf-nosed bats
Nicobar leaf-nosed bat	Hipposideros nicobarulae (Miller, 1902)	
Kolar leaf-nosed bat	Hipposideros hypophyllus (Kock & Bhat, 1994)	
Family Rhinolophidae: horseshoe bats
Andaman horseshoe bat	Rhinolophus cognatus (Andersen, 1906)	
Family Miniopteridae: bent-winged bats
Srinivasulu’s bent-winged bat	Miniopterus srinii (Bhat et al., 2023)	
Family Vespertilionidae: vesper bats
Meghalaya thick-thumbed bat	Glischropus meghalayanus (Borissov et al., 2022)	

=== Order Eulipotyphla: shrews and hedgehogs ===
Name	Species authority	Red List
Family Soricidae: shrews
Narcondam shrew	Crocidura narcondamica (Prakasan et al., 2018)	
Nicobar shrew	Crocidura nicobarica (Tyler, 1947)	
Andaman shrew	Crocidura andamanensis (Miller, 1946)	
Day's shrew	Suncus dayi (Dobson, 1888)	
Andaman spiny shrew	Crocidura hispida (Thomas, 1913)	
Jenkins's shrew	Crocidura jenkinsi (Chakraborty, 1978)	
Family Erinaceidae: hedgehogs
Madras hedgehog	Paraechinus nudiventris (Horsfield, 1851)	

=== Order Carnivora: carnivorans ===
Name	Species authority	Red List
Family Felidae: cats
Asiatic lion	Panthera leo persica (Meyer, 1826)	
Family Mustelidae: martens
Nilgiri marten	Martes gwatkinsii (Horsfield, 1851)	
Family Viverridae: civets
Brown palm civet	Paradoxurus jerdoni (Blanford, 1885)	
Malabar civet	Viverra civettina (Blyth, 1862)	

=== Order Artiodactyla: even-toed ungulates ===
Name	Species authority	Red List
Family Bovidae: antelopes
Nilgiri tahr	Nilgiritragus hylocrius (Ogilby, 1838)	
Family Cervidae: deer
Kashmir stag	Cervus hanglu hanglu (Wagner, 1844)	

=== Sub Order Suiformes: pigs ===
Name	Species authority	Red List
Family Suidae: pigs
Pygmy hog	Porcula salvania (Hodgson, 1847)	

== See also ==
- Fauna of India
- List of endemic birds of India
