= Pocock's highland rat =

Conservation status
- Least Concern (IUCN 3.1)

Scientific classification
- Kingdom: Animalia
- Phylum: Chordata
- Class: Mammalia
- Order: Rodentia
- Family: Muridae
- Genus: Rattus
- Species: R. pococki

Binomial name
- Rattus pococki Ellerman, 1941

Synonyms
- Stenomys pococki Ellerman, 1941

Species of rodent

Pocock's highland rat (Rattus pococki) is a species of rat of the family Muridae. It is native to New Guinea.

== Description ==
Pocock's highland rat was first described by Sir John Ellerman, 2nd Baronet in 1941. It was named for Reginald Innes Pocock, a zoologist who worked at the Natural History Museum, London from 1885 to 1904, and then as the superintendent of the Zoological Garden in London until 1923.

In closely related to Rattus niobe. In 2005 Musser and Carleton provisionally recognized it as a separate species on the grounds that it is larger in size and has slightly darker fur. It is also similar to Rattus arrogans but distinguished by its smaller size and darker fur. They stated that further study need to be done on the relationship to R. niobe.

== Distribution ==
The species is native to the Central Cordillera region of Papua Province, Indonesia and Papua New Guinea. It is found in the mountain tropical forests between 1500 and 2500 m. It is listed on IUCN as least concern as its wide distribution suggests an abundant population. It also has no major threats leading to a decline in numbers.
