= Southeastern xanthurus rat =

Conservation status
- Data Deficient (IUCN 3.1)

Scientific classification
- Kingdom: Animalia
- Phylum: Chordata
- Class: Mammalia
- Order: Rodentia
- Family: Muridae
- Genus: Rattus
- Species: R. salocco

Binomial name
- Rattus salocco Tate and Archbold, 1935

Species of rodent

The southeastern xanthurus rat (Rattus salocco), is a rodent of the genus Rattus.

== Habitat ==
This species is known only from the southeastern peninsula of Sulawesi, where it has been found at 300 and 1,500 m (980 and 4,920 ft) altitude. Only three specimens of this poorly understood species are known; the last were collected in 1932 at the mountain Tanke Salokko. The IUCN Red List therefore lists the species as Data Deficient.

== Classification ==
Although R. salocco is usually considered a subspecies or synonym of Rattus xanthurus, R. salocco was recognized as a separate species more closely related to R. marmosurus in the 2005 third edition of Mammal Species of the World.

== Notes ==
- Gerrie, R.; Kennerley, R. (2017). "Rattus salocco". IUCN Red List of Threatened Species. 2017 e.T136700A22446430. doi:10.2305/IUCN.UK.2017-2.RLTS.T136700A22446430.en.
- Musser, G.G.; Carleton, M.D. (2005). "Superfamily Muroidea". In Wilson, D.E.; Reeder, D.M. (eds.). Mammal Species of the World: A Taxonomic and Geographic Reference (3rd ed.). Baltimore, Maryland: The Johns Hopkins University Press. pp. 894–1531. ISBN 978-0-8018-8221-0.
