= R. palmarum =

R. palmarum may refer to:

- Rattus palmarum, the palm rat, a rodent species found only in India
- Rhynchophorus palmarum, the South American palm weevil, a beetle species
