= Little Indochinese field rat =

Little Indochinese Field Rat

Scientific classification
- Kingdom: Animalia
- Phylum: Chordata
- Class: Mammalia
- Order: Rodentia
- Family: Muridae
- Genus: Rattus
- Species: R. sakeratensis

Binomial name
- Rattus sakeratensis Gyldenstolpe, 1917

Synonyms
- Rattus losea (Swinhoe, 1871)

Species of rodent

The little Indochinese field rat (Rattus sakeratensis) is a common long-tailed rodent of the rat genus Rattus, in the family Muridae. It is mostly found in Southeast Asia, specifically concentrated in northern and central Thailand and the Vientiane Plain in northwestern Laos.

Initially considered to be a variant of Rattus losea, the little Indochinese field rat was recently determined to be its own separate species due to its propinquity with Rattus tanezumi.
