= Aceh rat =

Conservation status
- Data Deficient (IUCN 3.1)

Scientific classification
- Kingdom: Animalia
- Phylum: Chordata
- Class: Mammalia
- Order: Rodentia
- Family: Muridae
- Genus: Rattus
- Species: R. blangorum

Binomial name
- Rattus blangorum Miller, 1942

Species of rodent

The Aceh rat (Rattus blangorum) is a species of rodent from the family Muridae. The Aceh rat is listed as Data Deficient on the IUCN Red List because only two specimens have ever been recorded, and little is known about the species. The species was first regarded as its own species and then as a subspecies of the Malayan field rat (Rattus tiomanicus), but was once again considered distinct due to its small body size.

The Aceh rat is native to Indonesia, known only in the type locality of Blangnanga Base Camp in the Aceh foothills of Gunung Leuser National Park at 1,097 m (3,599 ft) on Sumatra. It is believed that the Aceh rat prefers lowland forests.

== See also ==
- Malayan field rat
