= Baletemys =

Scientific classification
- Kingdom: Animalia
- Phylum: Chordata
- Class: Mammalia
- Infraclass: Placentalia
- Order: Rodentia
- Family: Muridae
- Tribe: Rattini
- Genus: Baletemys; Rowsey et al., 2022
- Species: B. kampalili

Binomial name
- Baletemys kampalili Rowsey et al., 2022

Species of mammal

The Kampalili shrew-mouse or the Kampalili baletemys (Baletemys kampalili) is a species of rodent in the family Muridae. It is the only species in the genus Baletemys. It is found only on Mount Kampalili, in the highlands of eastern Mindanao, in the Philippines.

== See also ==
- List of living mammal species described in the 2020s
