= Palawan soft-furred mountain rat =

Conservation status
- Least Concern (IUCN 3.1)

Scientific classification
- Kingdom: Animalia
- Phylum: Chordata
- Class: Mammalia
- Order: Rodentia
- Family: Muridae
- Subfamily: Murinae
- Tribe: Rattini
- Genus: Palawanomys; Musser & Newcomb, 1983
- Species: P. furvus

Binomial name
- Palawanomys furvus Musser & Newcomb, 1983
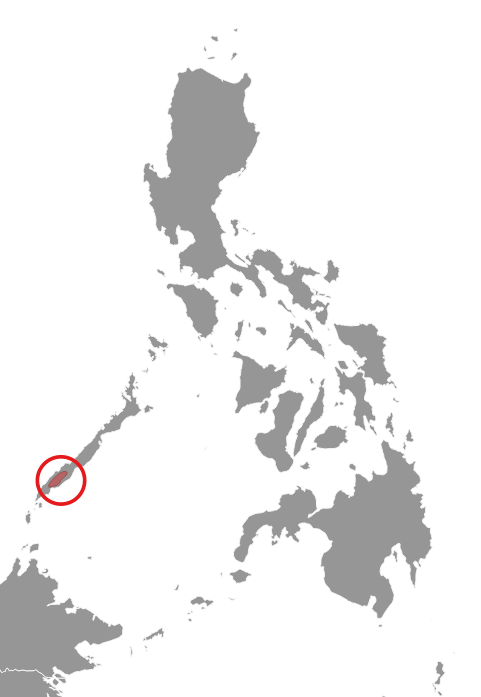

Species of rodent

The Palawan soft-furred mountain rat (Palawanomys furvus) is a species of rodent in the family Muridae. It is the only species in the genus Palawanomys. It is found only in Palawan, Philippines, and has been recorded on Mount Mantalingajan.
