= Nonsense rat =

Conservation status
- Endangered (IUCN 3.1)

Scientific classification
- Kingdom: Animalia
- Phylum: Chordata
- Class: Mammalia
- Order: Rodentia
- Family: Muridae
- Genus: Rattus
- Species: R. burrus

Binomial name
- Rattus burrus (Miller, 1902)

Synonyms
- Mus burrescens Miller, 1902; Mus burrulus Miller, 1902; Mus burrus Miller, 1902

Species of rodent

The nonsense rat, Nicobar Archipelago rat or Miller's Nicobar rat (Rattus burrus) is endemic to the Nicobar Islands in India. It lives on Great Nicobar, Little Nicobar, and Trinket islands. On Car Nicobar Island, Rattus palmarum and Rattus andamanensis live instead.

The species was first described in 1902 by Miller, who placed it in the genus Mus. Today it is classified in the genus Rattus. The origin of the name "nonsense rat" is uncertain, as Miller did not provide a common name in his original description. More recent sources, such as the IUCN, include it.

== Habitat and distribution ==
The nonsense rat is endemic to the Nicobar Islands, where it is confined to isolated populations on the islands of Great Nicobar, Little Nicobar and Trinket. It inhabits tropical evergreen and semi-evergreen forests.

== Conservation ==
The nonsense rat is classified as endangered by the IUCN.
