= Halmahera Island rat =

Scientific classification
- Kingdom: Animalia
- Phylum: Chordata
- Class: Mammalia
- Order: Rodentia
- Family: Muridae
- Genus: Rattus
- Species: R. halmaheraensis

Binomial name
- Rattus halmaheraensis P.-H. Fabre, Miguez, Holden, Fitriana, Semiadi, Musser, & K. M. Helgen, 2023

Species of mammal

The Halmahera Island rat (Rattus halmaheraensis) is species of rat that inhabits the island of Halmahera, in Indonesia, and perhaps the islands of Bacan and Ternate nearby.

== See also ==
- List of living mammal species described in the 2020s
