= Luzon broad-toothed rat =

Conservation status
- Data Deficient (IUCN 3.1)

Scientific classification
- Kingdom: Animalia
- Phylum: Chordata
- Class: Mammalia
- Order: Rodentia
- Family: Muridae
- Subfamily: Murinae
- Tribe: Rattini
- Genus: Abditomys; Musser, 1982
- Species: A. latidens

Binomial name
- Abditomys latidens (Sanborn, 1952)
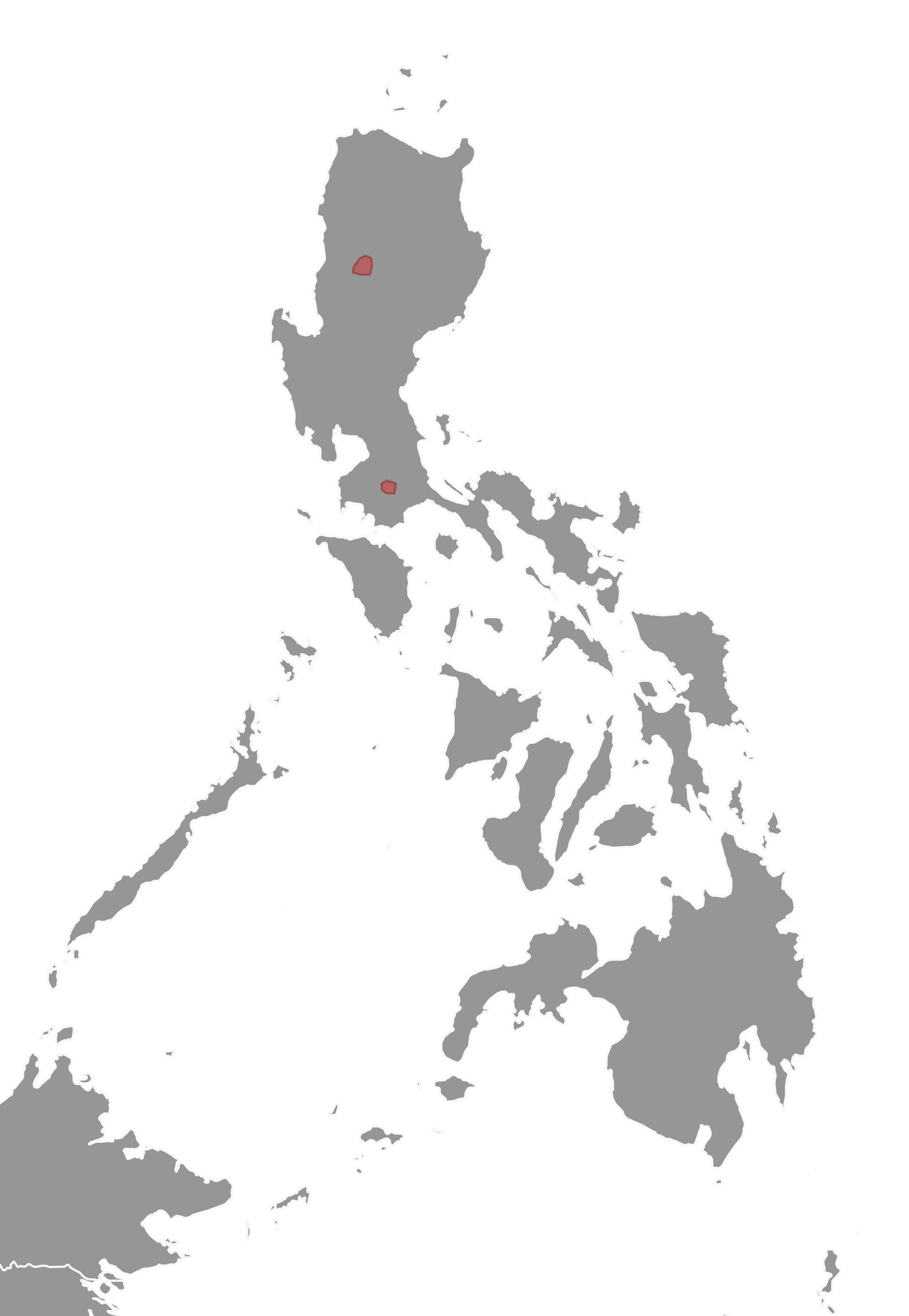

Synonyms
- Rattus latidens Sanborn, 1952

Species of rodent

The Luzon broad-toothed rat (Abditomys latidens) is a species of rodent in the family Muridae.

It is endemic to central and northern Luzon in the Philippines. It is the only member of the genus Abditomys.
