= Luzon short-nosed rat =

Conservation status
- Data Deficient (IUCN 3.1)

Scientific classification
- Kingdom: Animalia
- Phylum: Chordata
- Class: Mammalia
- Order: Rodentia
- Family: Muridae
- Subfamily: Murinae
- Tribe: Rattini
- Genus: Tryphomys; Miller, 1910
- Species: T. adustus

Binomial name
- Tryphomys adustus Miller, 1910
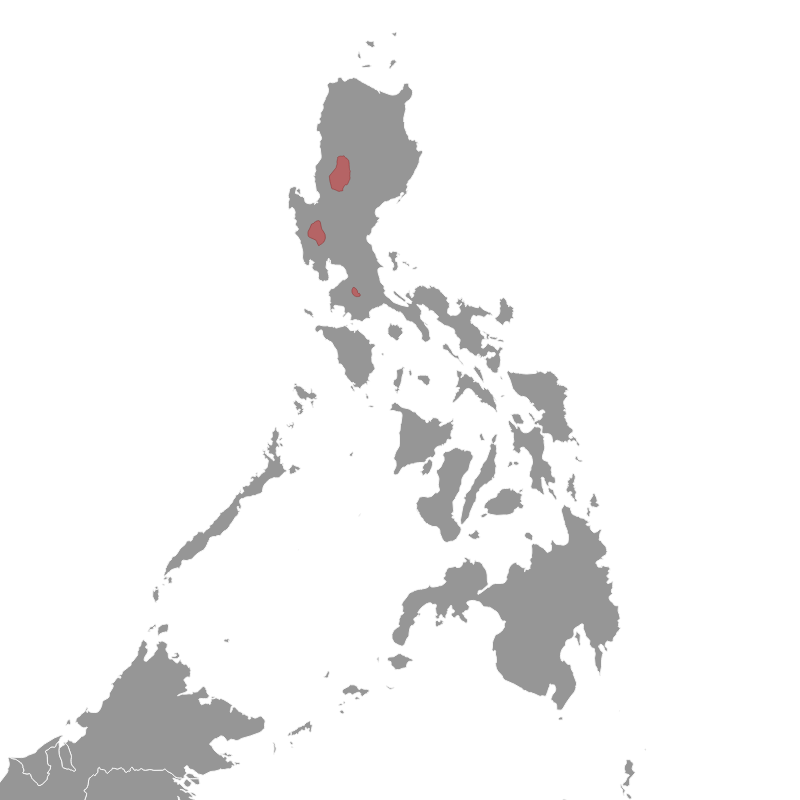

Species of rodent

The Luzon short-nosed rat (Tryphomys adustus) is a species of rodent in the family Muridae. It is the only species in the genus Tryphomys. It is found only in the Philippines, and is known only from Benguet, Laguna, and Tarlac provinces.
