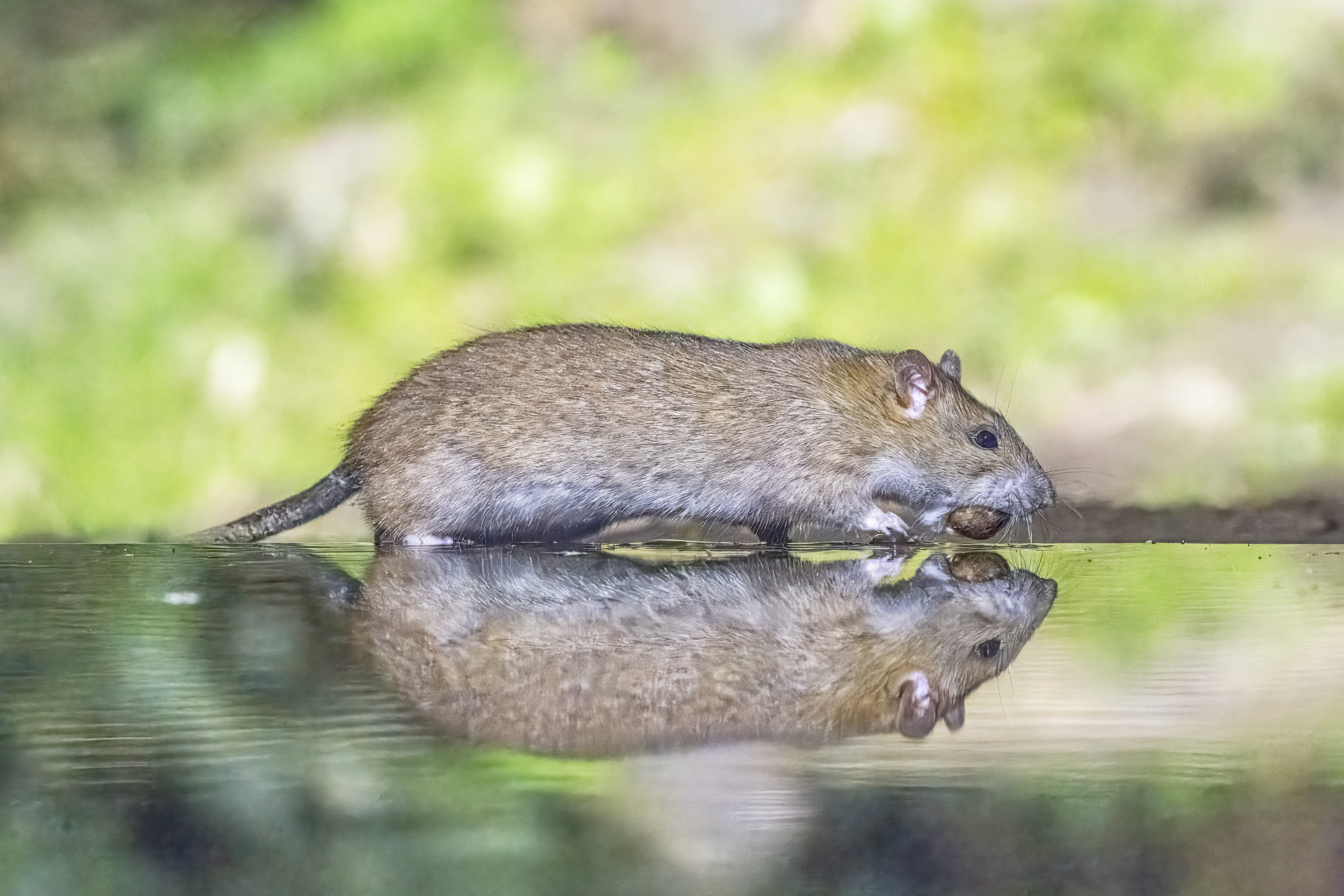
- The brown rat (Rattus norvegicus)

Scientific classification
- Kingdom: Animalia
- Phylum: Chordata
- Class: Mammalia
- Infraclass: Placentalia
- Order: Rodentia
- Family: Muridae
- Tribe: Rattini
- Genus: Rattus; Fischer de Waldheim, 1803

Type species
- Mus rattus Linnaeus, 1758

Species
- 68 species

Synonyms
- Stenomys Thomas, 1910; Acanthomys Gray, 1867; Christomys Sody, 1941; Cironomys Sody, 1941; Epimys Trouessart, 1881; Geromys Sody, 1941; Mollicomys Sody, 1941; Octomys Sody, 1941; Pullomys Sody, 1941; Togomys Dieterlen, 1989

= Rattus =

Rattus Temporal range: Early Pleistocene – Recent

Genus of rodents

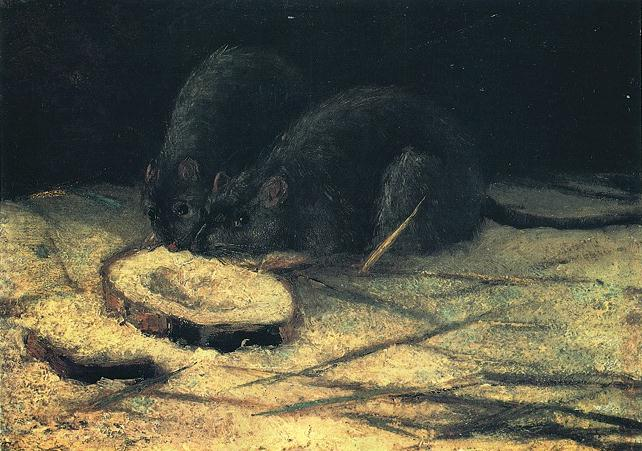
Two Rats by Vincent van Gogh (1884)

Rattus is a genus of muroid rodents, all typically called rats. However, the term rat can also be applied to rodent species outside of this genus.

== Species and description ==
The best-known Rattus species are the black rat (R. rattus) and the brown rat (R. norvegicus). The group is generally known as the Old World rats or true rats and originated in Asia. Rats are bigger than most Old World mice, which are their relatives, but seldom weigh over 500 grams (1.1 lb) in the wild.

== Taxonomy of Rattus ==
The genus Rattus is a member of the giant subfamily Murinae.

The genus Rattus proper contains 64 extant species. A subgeneric breakdown of the species has been proposed, but does not include all species.

=== Species ===
Genus Rattus – Typical rats
- incertae sedis
  - Enggano rat (Rattus enganus) – Indonesia (potentially extinct)
  - Philippine forest rat (Rattus everetti) – the Philippines
  - Polynesian rat or kiore (Rattus exulans) – originally native to Bangladesh, Myanmar, Thailand, Cambodia, Laos, Vietnam, Malaysia, and Indonesia, but now introduced throughout the Pacific (including most Polynesian, Melanesian, and Micronesian islands, most notably Fiji, Papua New Guinea, New Zealand, Easter Island and Hawaii), as well as the Philippines, Brunei, and Singapore, origin uncertain in Taiwan
  - Hainald's rat (Rattus hainaldi) – Indonesia
  - Halmahera Island rat (Rattus halmaheraensis) - Indonesia
  - Hoogerwerf's rat (Rattus hoogerwerfi) – Indonesia
  - Korinch's rat (Rattus korinchi) – Indonesia
  - †Maclear's rat (Rattus macleari) – Christmas Island (now extinct)
  - Nillu rat (Rattus montanus) – Sri Lanka
  - Moluccan prehensile-tailed rat (Rattus morotaiensis) – Indonesia
  - †Bulldog rat (Rattus nativitatis) – Christmas Island (now extinct)
  - Kerala rat (Rattus ranjiniae) – India
  - New Ireland forest rat (Rattus sanila) – New Ireland, Papua New Guinea (potentially extinct)
  - Andaman rat (Rattus stoicus) – the Andaman Islands, India
  - Timor rat (Rattus timorensis) – Timor
- R. norvegicus group
  - Himalayan field rat (Rattus nitidus) – originally native to Bhutan, China, India, Myanmar, Nepal, Thailand, and Vietnam (presence uncertain in Bangladesh), but now introduced to Indonesia, the Philippines, and Palau
  - Brown rat (Rattus norvegicus) – originally native to southeastern Siberia, northeastern China, and parts of Japan, but now introduced worldwide except Antarctica
  - Turkestan rat (Rattus pyctoris; obs. Rattus turkestanicus) – Afghanistan, China, India, Iran, Kyrgyzstan, Nepal and Pakistan
- R. rattus group
  - Sunburned rat (Rattus adustus) – Enggano Island, Indonesia
  - Sikkim rat (Rattus andamanensis) – Bhutan, Cambodia, China, India, Laos, Myanmar, Nepal, Thailand and Vietnam
  - Ricefield rat (Rattus argentiventer) – Southeast Asia
  - Summit rat (Rattus baluensis) – Malaysia
  - Aceh rat (Rattus blangorum) – Indonesia
  - Nonsense rat (Rattus burrus) – the Nicobar Islands, India
  - Hoffmann's rat (Rattus hoffmanni) – Indonesia
  - Koopman's rat (Rattus koopmani) – Indonesia
  - Lesser ricefield rat (Rattus losea) – China, Laos, Taiwan, Thailand and Vietnam
  - Mentawai rat (Rattus lugens) – Indonesia
  - Mindoro black rat (Rattus mindorensis) – the Philippines
  - Little soft-furred rat (Rattus mollicomulus) – Indonesia
  - Osgood's rat (Rattus osgoodi) – Vietnam
  - Palm rat (Rattus palmarum) – the Nicobar Islands, India
  - Black rat (Rattus rattus) – originally native to western India and Pakistan, but now introduced worldwide except Antarctica
  - Little Indochinese field rat (Rattus sakeratensis) – Thailand and Laos
  - Sahyadris forest rat (Rattus satarae) – India
  - Simalur rat (Rattus simalurensis) – Indonesia
  - Tanezumi rat (Rattus tanezumi) – Afghanistan, Bangladesh, Cambodia, China, the Cocos (Keeling) Islands, Fiji, India, Indonesia, Japan, North Korea, South Korea, Laos, Malaysia, Myanmar, Nepal, Pakistan, the Philippines, Taiwan, Thailand and Vietnam
  - Tawitawi forest rat (Rattus tawitawiensis) – the Philippines
  - Malayan field rat (Rattus tiomanicus) – Indonesia, Malaysia, the Philippines and Thailand
- R. xanthurus group
  - Bonthain rat (Rattus bontanus; obs. Rattus foramineus) – Indonesia
  - Lore Lindu xanthurus rat (Rattus facetus) – Indonesia
  - Opossum rat (Rattus marmosurus) – Indonesia
  - Peleng rat (Rattus pelurus) – Indonesia
  - Southeastern xanthurus rat (Rattus salocco) – Indonesia
  - Yellow-tailed rat (Rattus xanthurus) – Indonesia
- R. leucopus group (New Guinean group)
  - Vogelkop mountain rat (Rattus arfakiensis)
  - Western New Guinea mountain rat (Rattus arrogans)
  - Manus Island spiny rat (Rattus detentus) – Manus Island and potentially Los Negros, Papua New Guinea
  - Sula rat (Rattus elaphinus) – Indonesia
  - Spiny Ceram rat (Rattus feliceus) – Indonesia
  - Giluwe rat (Rattus giluwensis) – Papua New Guinea
  - Japen rat (Rattus jobiensis) – Indonesia
  - Cape York rat (Rattus leucopus) – Australia, Indonesia and Papua New Guinea
  - Eastern rat (Rattus mordax) – Papua New Guinea
  - Gag Island rat (Rattus nikenii) – Indonesia
  - Moss-forest rat (Rattus niobe) – Indonesia and Papua New Guinea
  - New Guinean rat (Rattus novaeguineae) – Papua New Guinea
  - Arianus's rat (Rattus omichlodes) – Indonesia
  - Pocock's highland rat (Rattus pococki) – Indonesia, Papua New Guinea
  - Large New Guinea spiny rat (Rattus praetor) – Indonesia, Papua New Guinea and the Solomon Islands
  - Glacier rat (Rattus richardsoni) – Indonesia
  - Stein's rat (Rattus steini) – Indonesia and Papua New Guinea
  - Van Deusen's rat (Rattus vandeuseni) – Papua New Guinea
  - Slender rat (Rattus verecundus) – Indonesia and Papua New Guinea
- R. fuscipes group (Australian group)
  - Dusky rat (Rattus colletti) – Australia
  - Bush rat (Rattus fuscipes) – Australia
  - Australian swamp rat (Rattus lutreolus) – Australia
  - Dusky field rat (Rattus sordidus) – Australia, Indonesia and Papua New Guinea
  - Pale field rat (Rattus tunneyi) – Australia
  - Long-haired rat (Rattus villosissimus) – Australia

=== Phylogeny ===
The following phylogeny of selected Rattus species is from Pagès et al. (2010).

- Rattini (tribe)
  - - Berylmys
      - Berylmys bowersi
      - Berylmys berdmorei
  - - Bandicota
      - Bandicota savilei
      - Bandicota indica
    - Rattus
      - - Rattus nitidus
        - Rattus norvegicus
      - - Rattus exulans
        - - Rattus andamanensis
          - - Rattus argentiventer
            - - - Rattus tiomanicus
                - Rattus losea
              - - other Rattus spp.
                - - Rattus tanezumi
                  - Rattus rattus

== Evolution ==
Molecular evidence suggests that Rattus originated in the Late Miocene and that it experienced an exceptionally rapid burst of diversification during the Pleistocene epoch.

=== Fossil species ===
In contrast to the large number of living species, as of 2024, just four fossil species have been placed in Rattus proper:

- Rattus baoshanensis - Late Pliocene China
- Rattus jaegeri - Late Pliocene to Early Pleistocene Thailand
- Rattus pristinus - Early Pleistocene China
- Rattus miyakoensis - Late Pleistocene Japan
