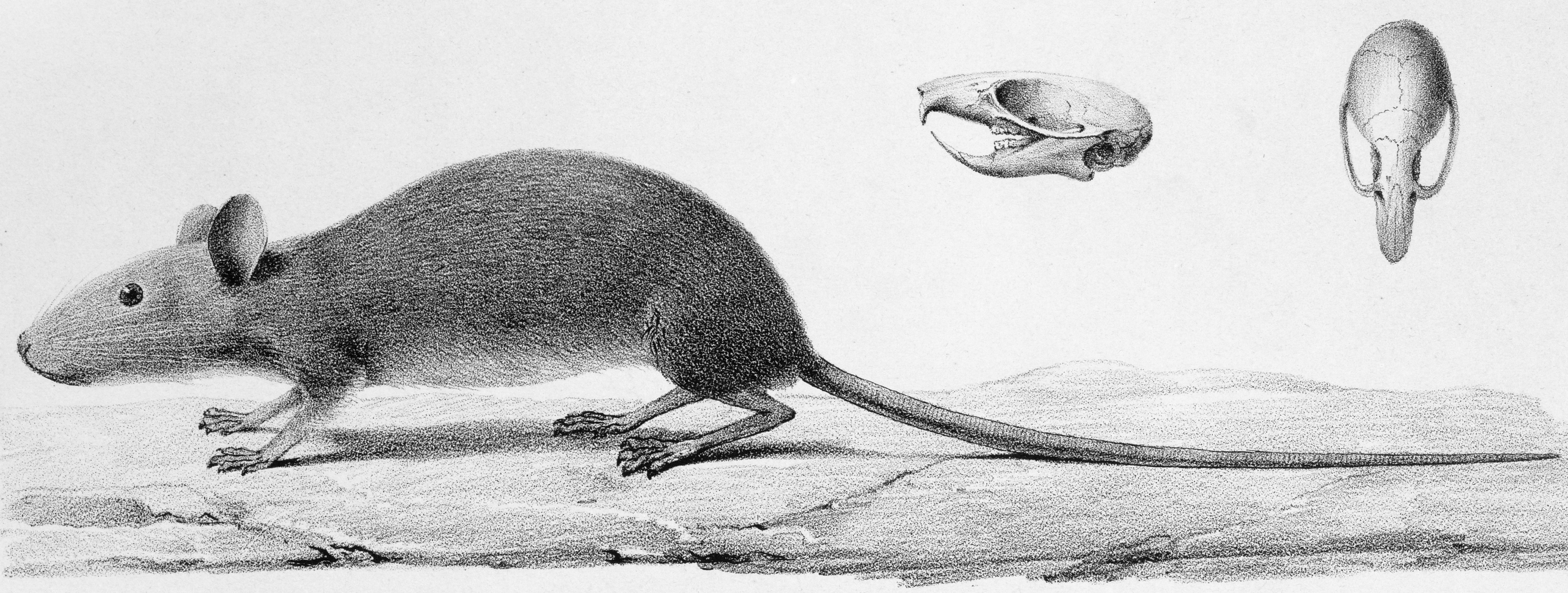

Conservation status
- Least Concern (IUCN 3.1)

Scientific classification
- Kingdom: Animalia
- Phylum: Chordata
- Class: Mammalia
- Order: Rodentia
- Family: Muridae
- Genus: Rattus
- Species: R. tanezumi

Binomial name
- Rattus tanezumi Temminck, 1844
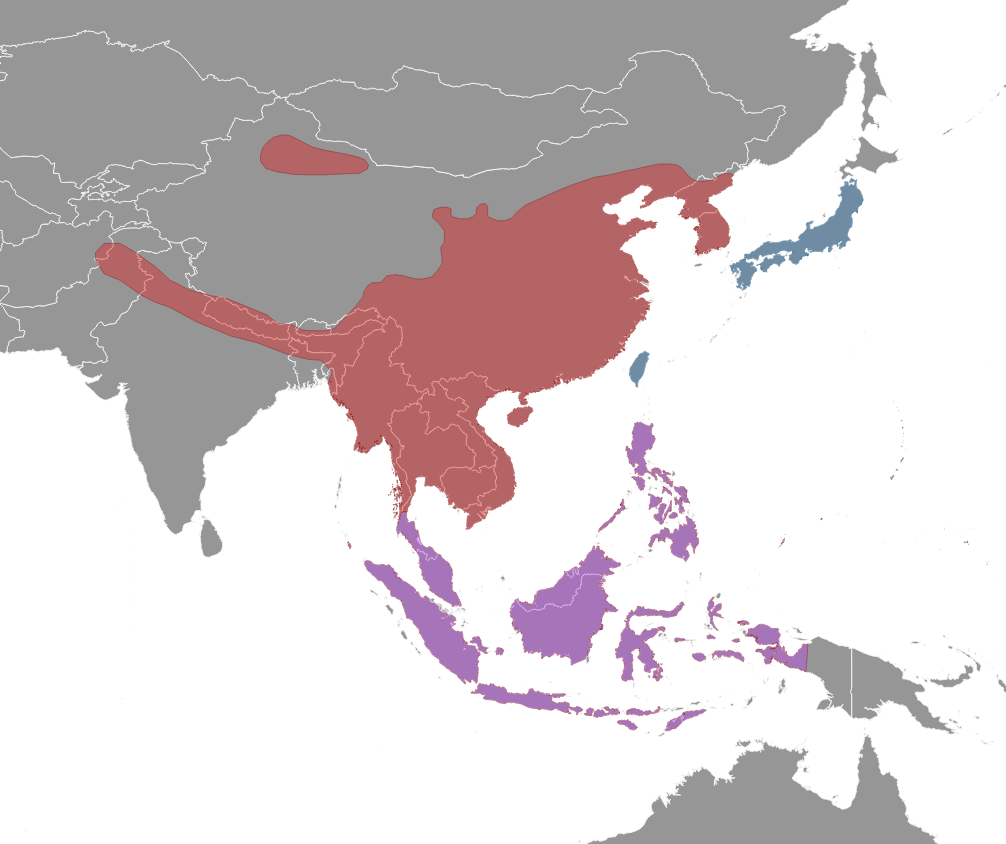

Synonyms
- List: Mus tanezumi Temminck, 1844; Rattus rattus tanezumi (Temminck, 1844); Mus nezumi Temminck, 1844; Mus brunneus Hodgson, 1845; Rattus brunneus (Hodgson, 1845); Rattus rattus brunneus (Hodgson, 1845); Mus brunneusculus Hodgson, 1845; Rattus brunneusculus (Hodgson, 1845); Rattus rattus brunneusculus (Hodgson, 1845); Mus nemoralis Blyth, 1851; Mus robustulus Blyth, 1859; Rattus (?) rattus robustulus (Blyth, 1859); Mus canna Swinhoe, 1871; Rattus canna (Swinhoe, 1871); Mus Ouang-Thomæ Milne-Edwards, 1871; Mus flavipectus Milne-Edwards, 1871; Rattus rattus flavipectus (Milne-Edwards, 1871); Rattus flavipectus (Milne-Edwards, 1871); Mus Germani Milne-Edwards, 1872; Rattus rattus germaini (Milne-Edwards, 1872); Mus sladeni J. Anderson, 1879; Mus yunnanensis J. Anderson, 1879; Rattus rattus yunnanensis (J. Anderson, 1879); Mus diardii Jentink, 1880; Rattus rattus diardi (Jentink, 1880) Mus neglectus; Jentink, 1880 Rattus rattus neglectus; (Jentink, 1880) Mus pannosus; G. S. Miller, 1900 Rattus rattus pannosus; (G.S. Miller, 1900) Mus pulliventer; G. S. Miller, 1902 Rattus pulliventer; (G. S. Miller, 1902) Mus griseiventer; Bonhote, 1903 Mus griseoventer; Bonhote, 1903 Mus kelleri; Mearns, 1905 Epimys kelleri; (Mearns, 1903) Mus mindanensis; Mearns, 1905 Rattus mindanensis; (Mearns, 1905) Epimys mindanensis; (Mearns, 1905) Rattus rattus mindanensis; (Mearns, 1905) Mus zamboangae; Mearns, 1905 Epimys zamboangae; (Mearns, 1905) Epimys neglectus; Lyon, 1911 Epimys benguetensis; Hollister, 1913 Rattus benguetensis; (Hollister, 1913) Epimys coloratus; Hollister, 1913 Epimys rattus dentatus; G. S. Miller, 1913 Rattus rattus dentatus; (G. S. Miller, 1913) Epimys rattus exsul; G. S. Miller, 1913 Rattus rattus exsul; (G. S. Miller, 1913) Epimys rattus fortunatus; G. S. Miller, 1913 Rattus rattus fortunatus; (G. S. Miller, 1913) Epimys rattus insulanus; G. S. Miller, 1913 Rattus rattus insulanus; (G. S. Miller, 1913) Epimys pannellus; G. S. Miller, 1913 Rattus rattus pannellus; (G. S. Miller, 1913) Epimys robiginosus; Hollister, 1913 Epimys rattus turbidus; G. S. Miller, 1913 Rattus rattus turbidus; (G. S. Miller, 1913) Epimys rattus poenitentiarii; Kloss, 1915 Rattus rattus poenitentiarii; (Kloss, 1915) Epimys rattus portus; Kloss, 1915 Rattus rattus portus; (Kloss, 1915) Rattus rattus griseiventer; Gyldenstolpe, 1916 Epimys rattus makensis; Kloss, 1916 Rattus rattus makensis; (Kloss, 1916) Epimys rattus rangensis; Kloss, 1916 Rattus rattus rangensis; (Kloss, 1916) Rattus rattus thai; Kloss, 1917 Rattus rattus bhotia; Hinton, 1918 Rattus rattus tistae; Hinton, 1918 Rattus rattus khyensis; Hinton, 1919 Rattus rattus kramensis; Kloss, 1919 Rattus rattus lanensis; Kloss, 1919 Rattus macmillani; Hinton, 1919 Rattus rattus macmillani; (Hinton, 1919) Rattus rattus mesanis; Kloss, 1919 Rattus rattus tatkonensis; Hinton, 1919 Rattus rattus tikos; Hinton, 1919 Rattus dammermani; O. Thomas, 1921 Rattus rattus dammermani; O. Thomas, 1921 Rattus palelae; G. S. Miller & Hollister, 1921 Rattus hoffmanni (?) palelae; (G. S. Miller & Hollister, 1921) Rattus molliculus; H. C. Robinson & Kloss, 1922 Rattus rattus molliculus; (H. C. Robinson & Kloss, 1922) Rattus rattus sumbae; Sody, 1930 Rattus rattus samati; Sody, 1932 Rattus rattus santalum; Sody, 1932 Rattus rattus septicus; Sody, 1933 Rattus rattus moluccarius; Sody, 1933 Rattus mindanensis tablasi; E. H. Taylor, 1934 Rattus lalolis; Tate & Archbold, 1935 Rattus rattus (?) lalolis; Tate & Archbold, 1935 Rattus rattus palembang; Tate & Archbold, 1935 Rattus rattus alangensis; Chasen, 1937 Rattus masaretes; Sody, 1937 Rattus rattus kadanus; Chasen, 1937 Rattus rattus lontaris; Chasen, 1937 Rattus rattus moheius; Chasen, 1937 Rattus rattus panjius; Chasen, 1937 Rattus rattus pipidonis; Chasen, 1937 Rattus rattus robinsoni; Chasen, 1940 Rattus rattus argyraceus; Sody, 1941 Rattus rattus auroreus; Sody, 1941 Rattus rattus barussanoides; Sody, 1941 Rattus rattus makassarius; Sody, 1941 Rattus rattus obiensis; Sody, 1941 Rattus rattus pelengensis; Sody, 1941 Rattus sapoensis; Sody, 1941 Rattus rattus talaudensis; Sody, 1941 Rattus toxi; Sody, 1941 Rattus rattus bullocki; Roonwal, 1948 Rattus rattus brevicaudus; Kuroda, 1952 Rattus rattus rufescens form. kurokuma; Kuroda, 1953 Rattus rattus rufescens form. shirokuma; Kuroda, 1953 Rattus rattus amboinensis; Laurie & J. Edwards Hill, 1954 Rattus rattus yeni; Đào Văn Tiến, 1960 Rattus rattus mansorius; D. H. Johnson, 1962 Rattus rattus povolnyi; Niethammer & J. Martens, 1975 Rattus rattus brevicaudus; Chakraborty, 1976

= Tanezumi rat =

Species of rodent

The tanezumi rat (Rattus tanezumi), also known as the Asian house rat, East Asian house rat, Oriental house rat, Oriental rat or Oriental roof rat, is a species of rodent belonging to the family Muridae, which includes the mice, rats, gerbils and related species. This rat is indigenous to southern Asia and has been introduced elsewhere.

== Taxonomy ==
The tanezumi rat was first formally described as Mus tanezumi in 1844 by the Dutch zoologist Coenraad Jacob Temminck with its type locality given as "japonais est Ta-nezumi." which has been interpreted as Japan, near Nagasaki on Kyushu. This species is included in the Rattus rattus species complex within the genus Rattus this group includes R. rattus, R. tanezumi, R. sakeratensis and R. tiomanicus. These species are not well defined and further study is required to define the species limits within this group. The name diardii, currently treated as a synonym of this species, is probably a distinct species. Most authorities retain this taxon under R. tanezumi until such work is undertaken and the names that are applicable to the different lineages in this complex are settled.

== Description ==
The tanezumi rat is a medium sized rodent, with a tail that is at least equal to the length of its head and body. The adults have bodies which measure 114 to 224 mm (4.5 to 8.8 in) in length with a tail that is 110 to 231 mm (4.3 to 9.1 in) in length and has a weight of 65 to 300 g (2.3 to 10.6 oz). The fur on the back and sides is olive-brown, and the ventral surface generally paler. The almost naked tail is dark grey. It has black eyes and large ears. the juveniles have a comparatively larger head and a smaller body.

== Distribution and habitat ==
The tanezimi rat is widely distributed but it is unclear where this species is native and where it has been introduced. There are also issues with determining its distribution in comparison with the closely related R. rattus. The International Union for Conservation of Nature state that they consider the native range to extend from eastern Afghanistan through central and southern Nepal, Bhutan, northern India, northern Bangladesh and northeastern India into southern and central China, Hainan Island, the Korean Peninsula, and mainland Southeast Asia, including offshore islands, south to the Isthmus of Kra, it is also thought to be likely native to Mergui Archipelago. Its status in Taiwan and Japan is unclear. It is probable that it is an introduced species to the Andaman Islands, Nicobar Islands, the entirety of the Malay Archipelago as far east as New Guinea. It has also been introduced to the islands of Micronesia, Enewetak Atoll and Fiji. Farther afield this species has been introduced to South Africa where it is found in Gauteng, KwaZulu-Natal, Limpopo and Mpumalanga.

The tanezimi rat is a highly adaptable species that is frequently encountered in and around habitation and in agricultural areas. In the Philippines this species is common in disturbed lowland and montane forest up to altitudes of 1,800 m (5,900 ft).

== Biology ==
The tanezimi rat is an omnivorous mammal that mainly eats plant matter. This species can be an economically important pest in rice fields, and of coconut, banana and maize crops. These rats live in mixed sex groups, each male or female will mate with more than one member of the other sex. They breed throughout the year, giving birth to litters of 3 to 7 pups, pregnancy last just 3-4 days, the pups open their eyes at 15 days old and are weaned at around 3 weeks old. They may be sexually mature at 3 months old.

== Gallery ==
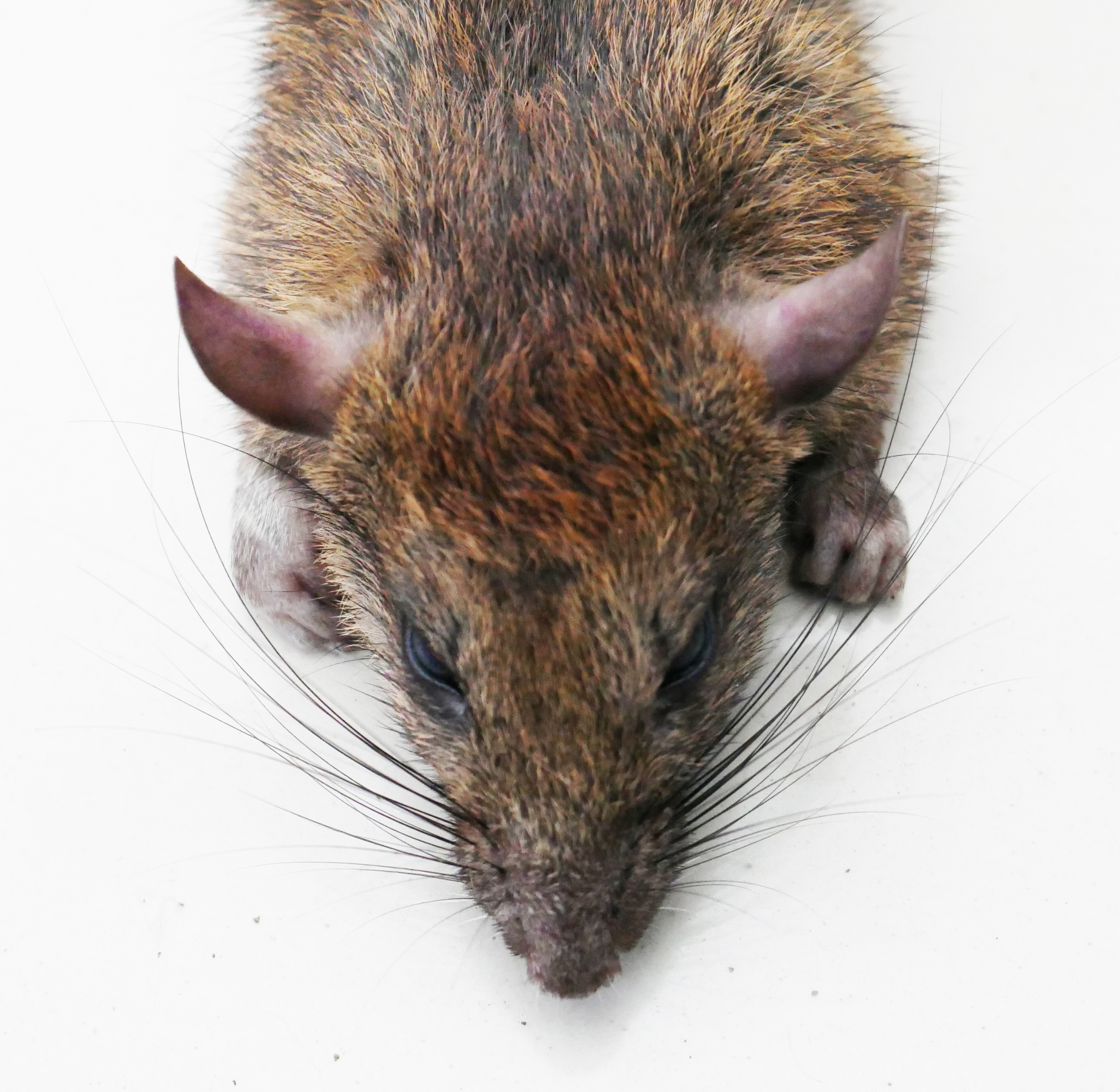

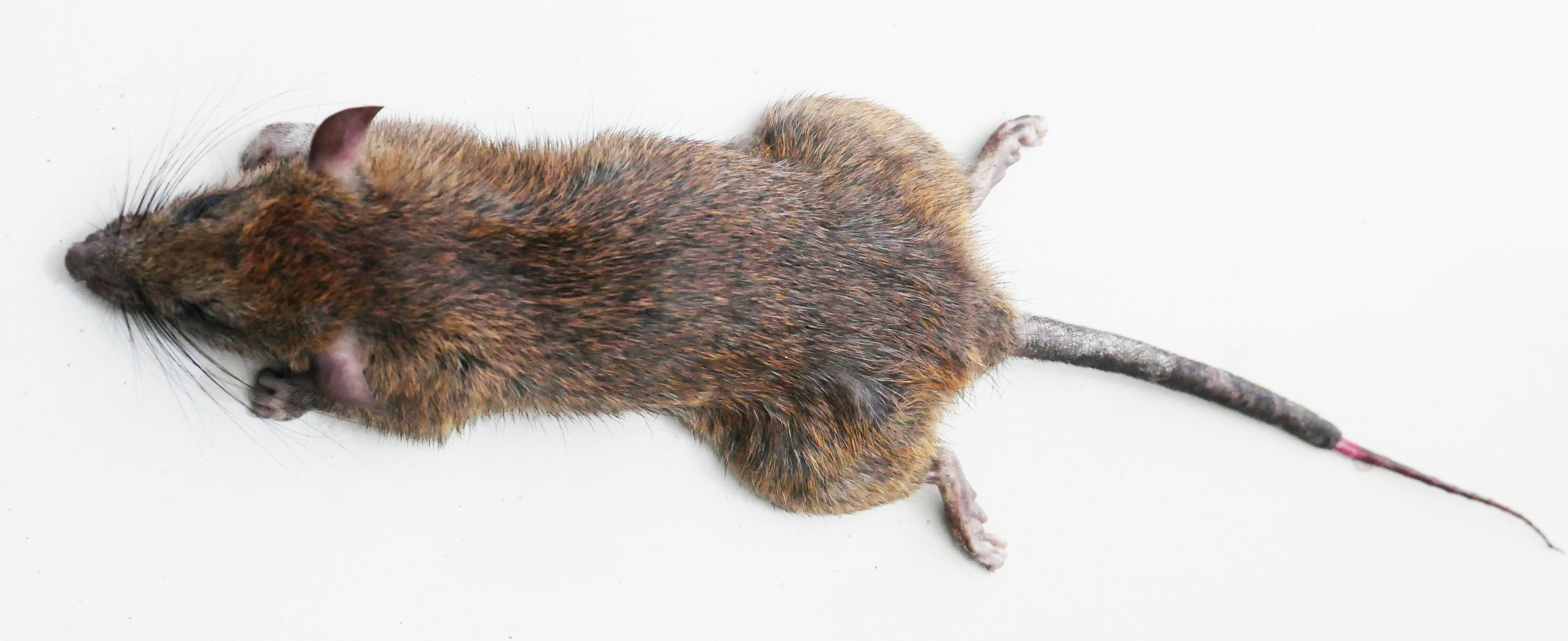

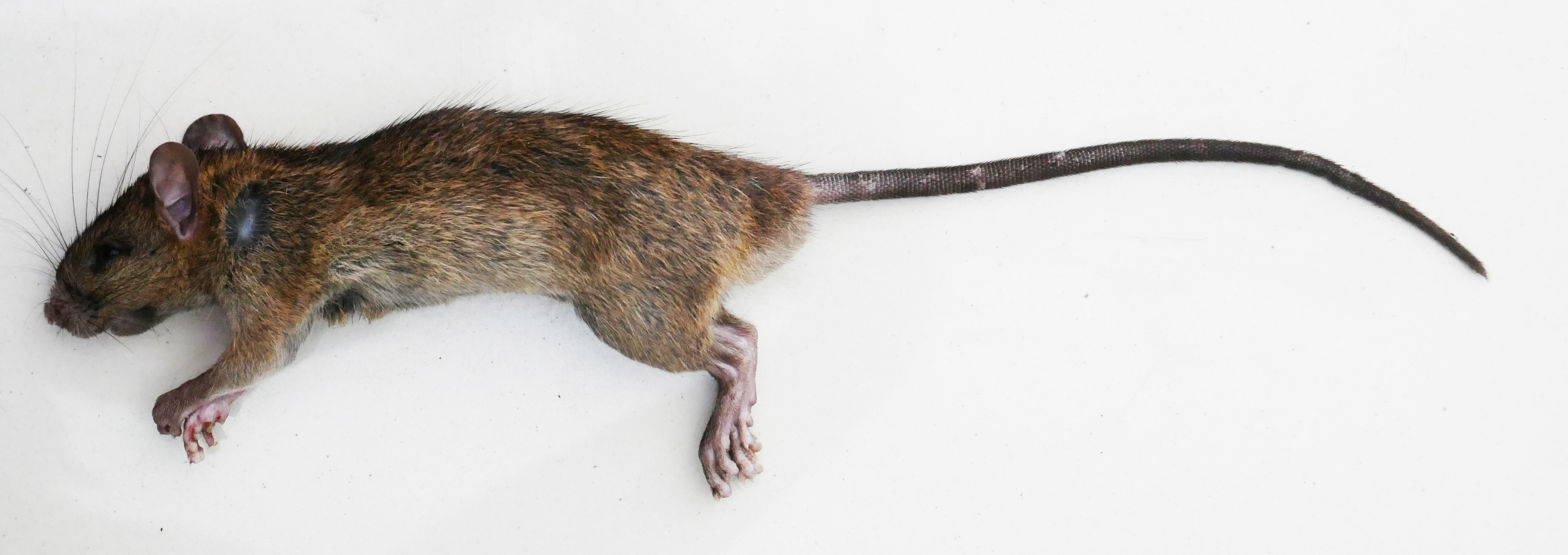
