= Giluwe rat =

Conservation status
- Least Concern (IUCN 3.1)

Scientific classification
- Kingdom: Animalia
- Phylum: Chordata
- Class: Mammalia
- Order: Rodentia
- Family: Muridae
- Genus: Rattus
- Species: R. giluwensis

Binomial name
- Rattus giluwensis Hill, 1960

Species of rodent

The Giluwe rat (Rattus giluwensis) is a species of rodent in the family Muridae. It is found only in Papua New Guinea, on Mount Giluwe and the subalpine grasslands of the Kaijende Highlands.
