= Bonthain rat =

Conservation status
- Least Concern (IUCN 3.1)

Scientific classification
- Kingdom: Animalia
- Phylum: Chordata
- Class: Mammalia
- Infraclass: Placentalia
- Order: Rodentia
- Family: Muridae
- Genus: Rattus
- Species: R. bontanus

Binomial name
- Rattus bontanus Thomas, 1921

Synonyms
- Rattus foramineus Sody, 1941

Species of rodent

The Bonthain rat or southwestern xanthurus rat (Rattus bontanus) is a species of rodent in the family Muridae. It is found only in southwestern Sulawesi, Indonesia.
