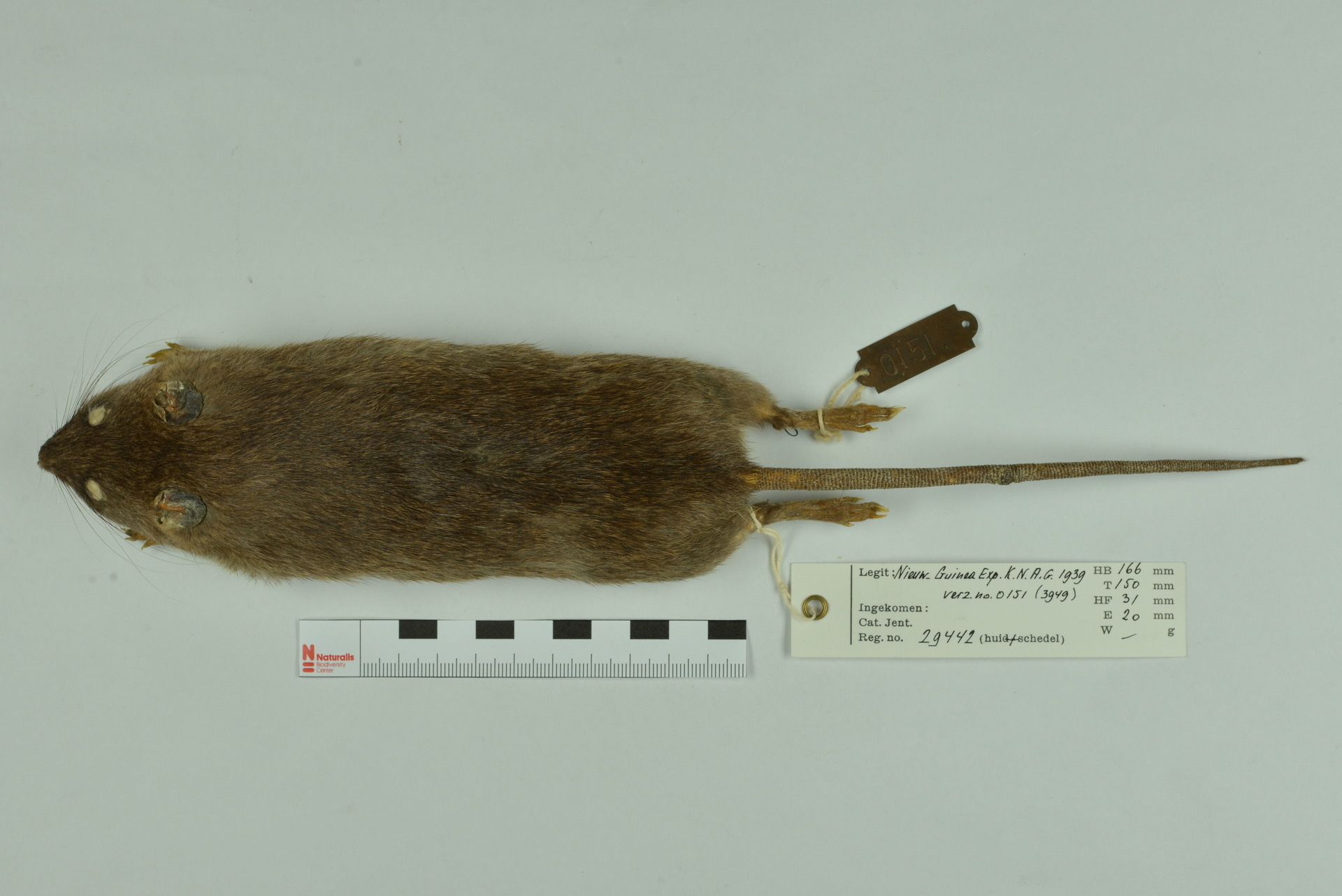

Conservation status
- Least Concern (IUCN 3.1)

Scientific classification
- Kingdom: Animalia
- Phylum: Chordata
- Class: Mammalia
- Order: Rodentia
- Family: Muridae
- Genus: Rattus
- Species: R. verecundus

Binomial name
- Rattus verecundus (Thomas, 1904)

Synonyms
- Stenomys verecundus Thomas, 1904

= Slender rat =

Species of rodent

The slender rat (Rattus verecundus) is a species of rodent in the family Muridae. It is found in West Papua, Indonesia and Papua New Guinea.

== Names ==
It is known as sjang in the Kalam language of Papua New Guinea.
