= Koopman's rat =

Conservation status
- Data Deficient (IUCN 3.1)

Scientific classification
- Kingdom: Animalia
- Phylum: Chordata
- Class: Mammalia
- Order: Rodentia
- Family: Muridae
- Genus: Rattus
- Species: R. koopmani

Binomial name
- Rattus koopmani Musser & Holden, 1991

Species of rodent

Koopman's rat (Rattus koopmani) is a species of rodent in the family Muridae. It is found only on Peleng island, located in the Banggai Islands (Kepulauan Banggai) off the southeastern coast of Sulawesi, Indonesia.
