= New Ireland forest rat =

Conservation status
- Extinct

Scientific classification
- Kingdom: Animalia
- Phylum: Chordata
- Class: Mammalia
- Order: Rodentia
- Family: Muridae
- Genus: Rattus
- Species: †R. sanila

Binomial name
- †Rattus sanila Flannery & White, 1991

Species of rodent

The New Ireland forest rat (Rattus sanila) is a large rodent in the family Muridae. It is endemic to New Ireland, in the Bismarck Archipelago, Papua New Guinea.

== Description ==
Rattus sanila is known only by the discovery of some 7 subfossil fragments of jaw dated to over 3,000 years old. The molars of this particular species are broad and have a very complex structure of the cusp. The diastema is also longer than in other species of the genus Rattus suggesting a separate species which may be a relict of an archaic or ancestral dispersal of Rattus stock to New Guinea and Australia. This species probably still survives in some primary forest.
