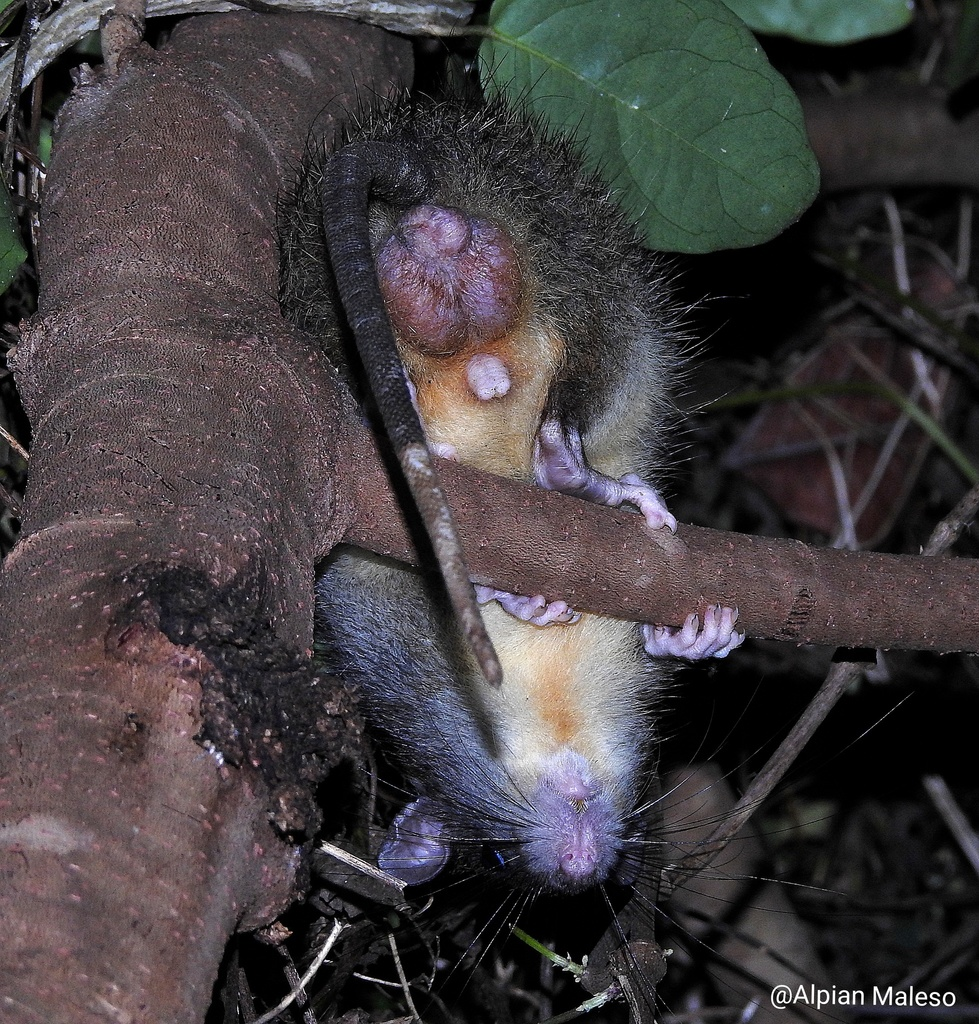

Conservation status
- Data Deficient (IUCN 3.1)

Scientific classification
- Kingdom: Animalia
- Phylum: Chordata
- Class: Mammalia
- Order: Rodentia
- Family: Muridae
- Genus: Rattus
- Species: R. pelurus

Binomial name
- Rattus pelurus Sody, 1941

= Peleng rat =

Species of rodent

The Peleng rat (Rattus pelurus) is a species of rodent in the family Muridae. It is found only on Peleng Island off the southeastern coast of Sulawesi, Indonesia.
