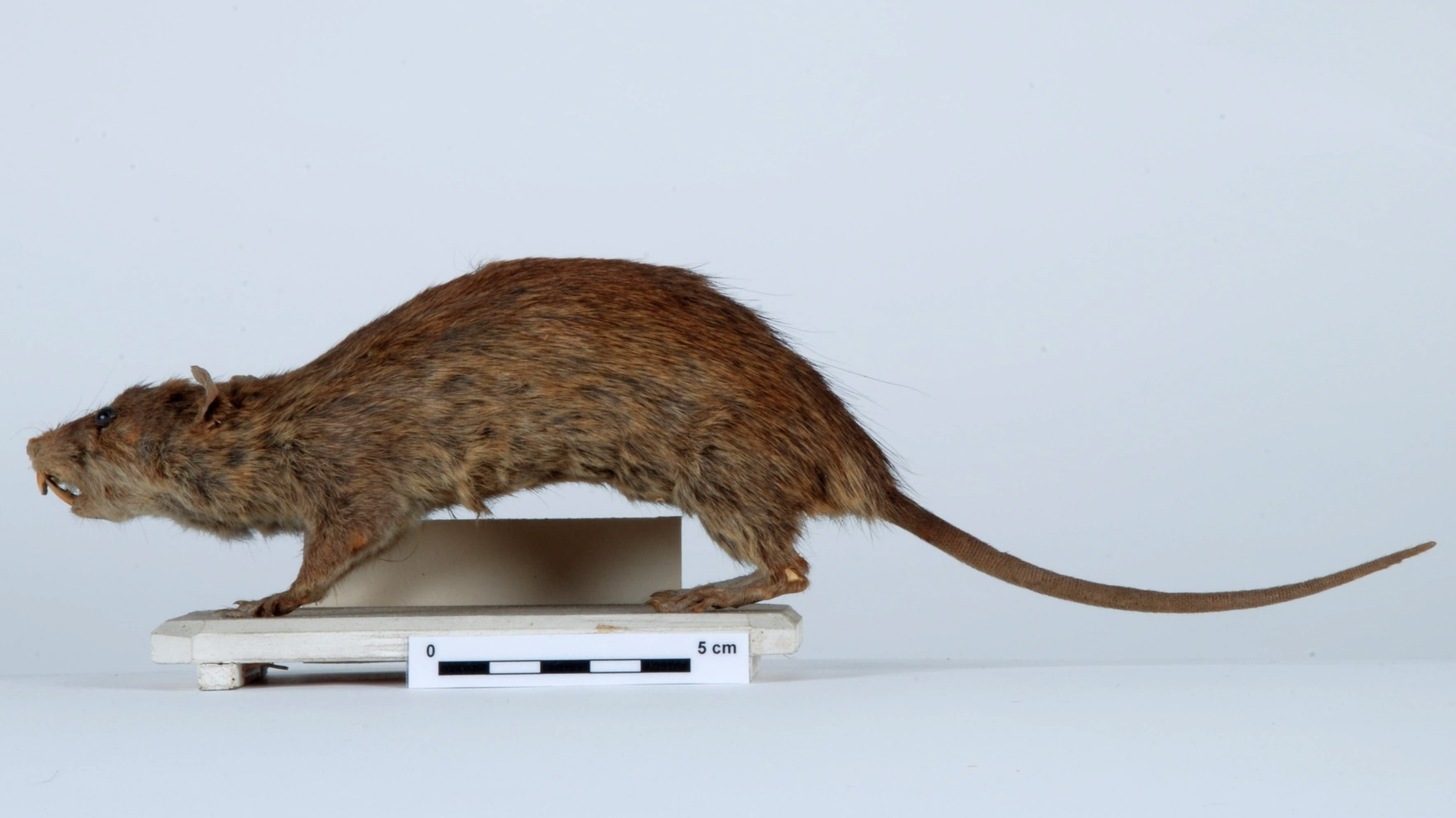
- stuffed specimen

Conservation status
- Least Concern (IUCN 3.1)

Scientific classification
- Kingdom: Animalia
- Phylum: Chordata
- Class: Mammalia
- Infraclass: Placentalia
- Order: Rodentia
- Family: Muridae
- Genus: Rattus
- Species: R. nitidus

Binomial name
- Rattus nitidus (Hodgson, 1845)
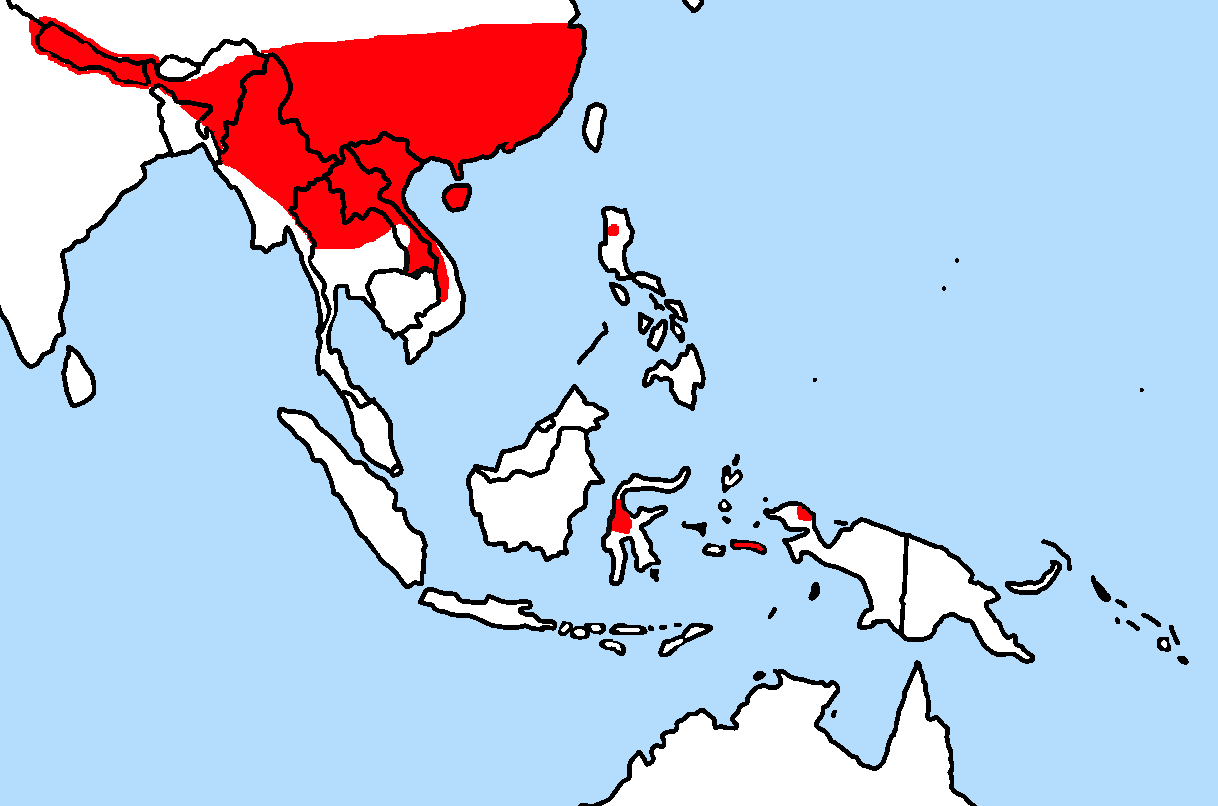
- Native distribution

Synonyms
- Mus nittidus; Mus horeites; Mus aequicordalis; Mus guhai

= Himalayan field rat =

Species of rodent

The Himalayan field rat (Rattus nitidus), sometimes known as the white-footed Indo-Chinese rat, is a species of rodent in the family Muridae. It has a wide range, being found in India, Bangladesh, Nepal, Bhutan, China, Myanmar, Laos, Thailand, and Vietnam, with introduced populations in Indonesia (widely), Palau, and the Philippines. A common species, the International Union for Conservation of Nature has assessed its conservation status as being of "least concern".

== Taxonomy ==
The Himalayan field rat was first described in 1845 by Brian Houghton Hodgson, a British naturalist and ethnologist who worked in India and Nepal and gave it the name Mus nitidus, but it was later transferred to the genus Rattus. Two subspecies are recognised, R. n. nitidus and R. n. obsoletus. Recent molecular research has shown that the Himalayan field rat is closely related to the brown rat (Rattus norvegicus), and morphological studies confirm this.

== Description ==
The head-and-body length is 160 to 180 mm (6 to 7 in). It has soft, brown dorsal fur, and whitish underparts, each hair having a grey base. The feet are white, the hind feet are narrower than those of R. norvegicus, and the soles have ridges which provides extra grip when the animal is climbing.

== Distribution and habitat ==
This rat is native to southeastern Asia. Its range extends from northern India, Bhutan, Nepal and probably Bangladesh, through central, southern and eastern China and southward to Myanmar, Thailand, Laos and Vietnam. It has been introduced to Palau, the Philippines and Indonesia. It generally inhabits both primary and secondary forests at altitudes up to about 2,750 m (9,000 ft), but is an adaptable species and is also found in plantations, on agricultural land and around human dwellings.

== Status ==
R. nitidus is an abundant and adaptable species with a very wide range, able to live in a number of different environments. No particular threats have been identified, and the International Union for Conservation of Nature has assessed its conservation status as being of "least concern".
