= Large New Guinea spiny rat =

Conservation status
- Least Concern (IUCN 3.1)

Scientific classification
- Kingdom: Animalia
- Phylum: Chordata
- Class: Mammalia
- Order: Rodentia
- Family: Muridae
- Genus: Rattus
- Species: R. praetor

Binomial name
- Rattus praetor (Thomas, 1888)

Species of mammal

The large New Guinea spiny rat (Rattus praetor) is a species of rodent in the family Muridae. It is found in Indonesia, Papua New Guinea, and the Solomon Islands.
