= Arianus's rat =

Conservation status
- Data Deficient (IUCN 3.1)

Scientific classification
- Kingdom: Animalia
- Phylum: Chordata
- Class: Mammalia
- Order: Rodentia
- Family: Muridae
- Genus: Rattus
- Species: R. omichlodes

Binomial name
- Rattus omichlodes Misonne, 1979

Species of rodent

Arianus's rat (Rattus omichlodes), also known as Arianus' New Guinea mountain rat, is a species of rat native to the mountains of Papua Province, Indonesia.
