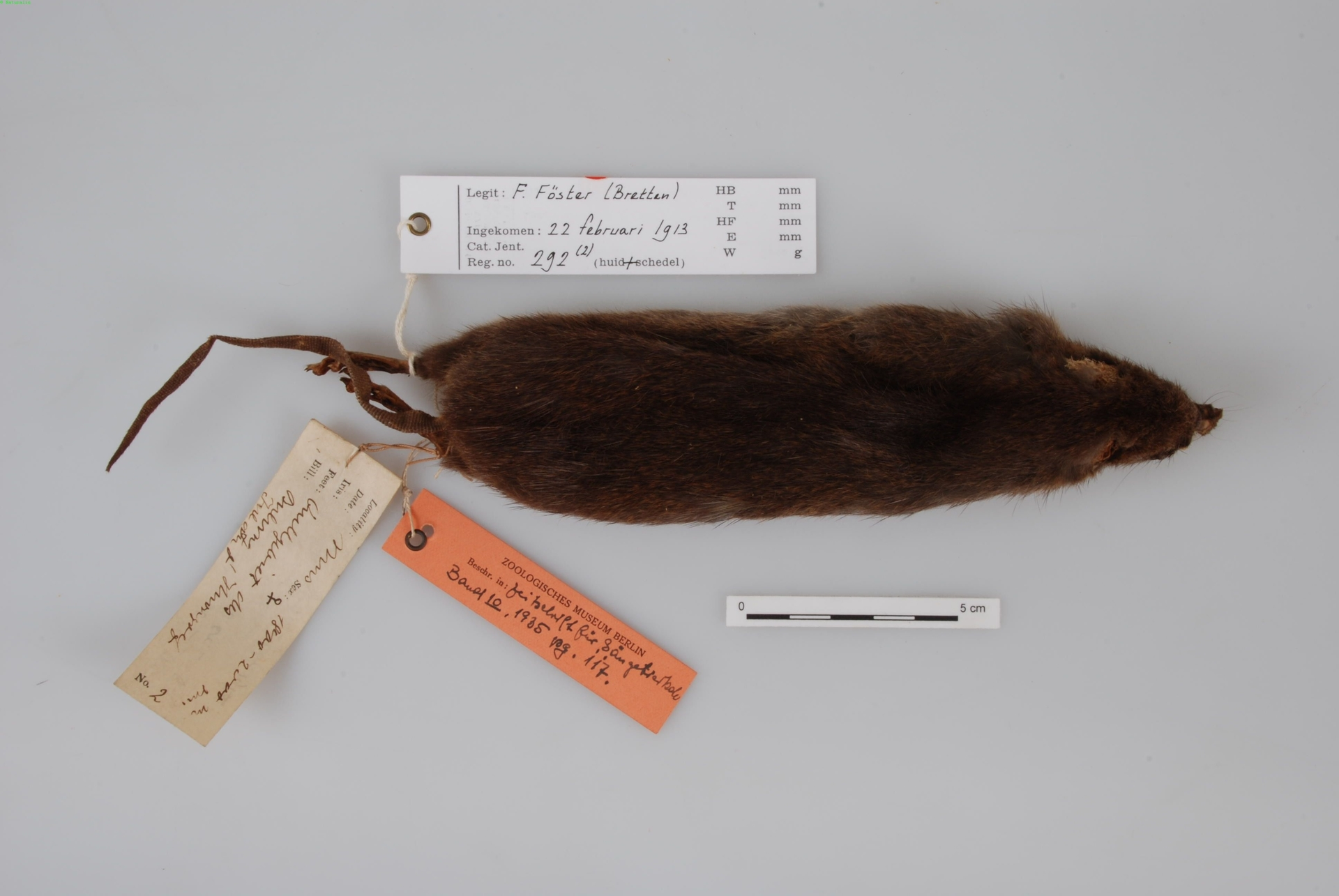

Conservation status
- Least Concern (IUCN 3.1)

Scientific classification
- Kingdom: Animalia
- Phylum: Chordata
- Class: Mammalia
- Order: Rodentia
- Family: Muridae
- Genus: Rattus
- Species: R. steini

Binomial name
- Rattus steini Rümmler, 1935

= Stein's rat =

Species of rodent

Stein's rat (Rattus steini), also known as the small spiny rat, is a species of rodent in the family Muridae. It is found in West Papua, Indonesia and Papua New Guinea.

== Subspecies ==
Subspecies include:

- Rattus steini baliemensis
- Rattus steini foersteri
- Rattus steini hageni
- Rattus steini steini
