= Mindoro black rat =

Conservation status
- Least Concern (IUCN 3.1)

Scientific classification
- Kingdom: Animalia
- Phylum: Chordata
- Class: Mammalia
- Order: Rodentia
- Family: Muridae
- Genus: Rattus
- Species: R. mindorensis

Binomial name
- Rattus mindorensis (Thomas, 1898)
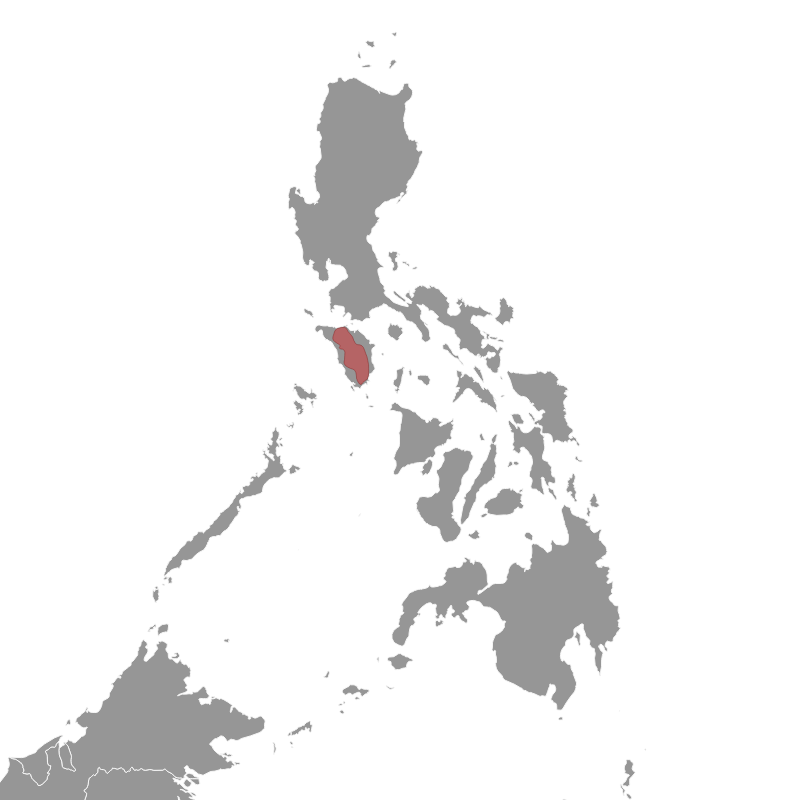

Species of rodent

The Mindoro black rat (Rattus mindorensis) is a species of rodent in the family Muridae. It is found only in hilly and forested areas of Mindoro island, the Philippines.
