= Little soft-furred rat =

Conservation status
- Endangered (IUCN 3.1)

Scientific classification
- Kingdom: Animalia
- Phylum: Chordata
- Class: Mammalia
- Order: Rodentia
- Family: Muridae
- Genus: Rattus
- Species: R. mollicomulus

Binomial name
- Rattus mollicomulus Tate & Archbold, 1935

Species of rodent

The little soft-furred rat (Rattus mollicomulus) is a species of rodent in the family Muridae. It is found only on the upper slopes of Mount Lompobattang in Bantaeng Regency, South Sulawesi, Indonesia. It gets its name from its soft, silky fur. It is smaller than a roof rat, but larger than a house mouse.
