= Dusky rat =

Conservation status
- Least Concern (IUCN 3.1)

Scientific classification
- Kingdom: Animalia
- Phylum: Chordata
- Class: Mammalia
- Order: Rodentia
- Family: Muridae
- Genus: Rattus
- Species: R. colletti

Binomial name
- Rattus colletti (Thomas, 1904)

Synonyms
- Mus colletti Thomas, 1904

Species of rodent

The dusky rat (Rattus colletti) is an indigenous species of rodent in the family Muridae found in Australia.

== Name ==
Kunwinjku people of western Arnhem Land call this animal mulbbu, a name also applied to other rodent species. It was first described in 1904 by British zoologist Oldfield Thomas.

== Range ==
The rat is found only in the monsoonal subcoastal plains of the Northern Territory, Australia.

== Predation ==
The dusky rat is eaten according to Peterson Nganjmirra and is prey to the Australian water python (Liasis fuscus) also ranging across northern Australia.
