= Enggano rat =

Conservation status
- Data Deficient (IUCN 3.1)

Scientific classification
- Kingdom: Animalia
- Phylum: Chordata
- Class: Mammalia
- Order: Rodentia
- Family: Muridae
- Genus: Rattus
- Species: R. enganus

Binomial name
- Rattus enganus (Miller, 1906)

Species of rodent

The Enggano Island rat (Rattus enganus) is a species of rodent in the family Muridae. It is found only on Enggano Island, Indonesia. It is critically endangered and has not been collected in more than a century, so is very possibly extinct.
