= Eastern rat =

Conservation status
- Least Concern (IUCN 3.1)

Scientific classification
- Kingdom: Animalia
- Phylum: Chordata
- Class: Mammalia
- Order: Rodentia
- Family: Muridae
- Genus: Rattus
- Species: R. mordax

Binomial name
- Rattus mordax (Thomas, 1904)

Species of rodent

The eastern rat (Rattus mordax) is a species of rodent in the family Muridae.

It is found only in Papua New Guinea.
