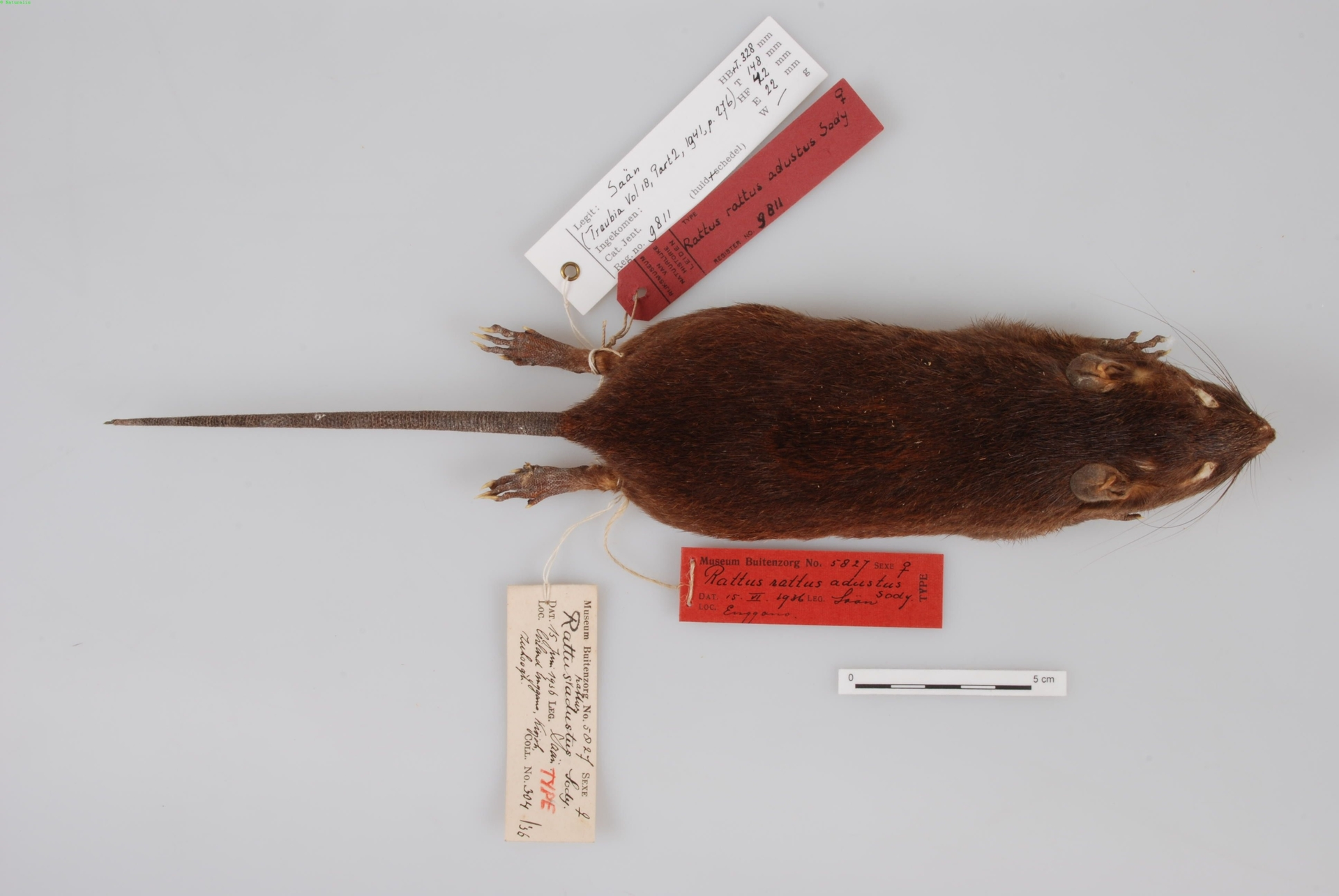
- A Sunburnt Rat specimen

Conservation status
- Data Deficient (IUCN 3.1)

Scientific classification
- Kingdom: Animalia
- Phylum: Chordata
- Class: Mammalia
- Order: Rodentia
- Family: Muridae
- Genus: Rattus
- Species: R. adustus

Binomial name
- Rattus adustus Sody, 1940

= Sunburned rat =

Species of rodent

The sunburned rat (Rattus adustus) is a species of rat from Enggano Island in Indonesia. It is only known from the holotype and has not been recorded since its description in 1940.

== Description ==
The rat's head and body grow to a combined length of 18 cm, while the tail grows up to 14.8 cm and is black in colour. The fur is a dark brown above, dark brownish-grey below.
