= Osgood's rat =

Conservation status
- Least Concern (IUCN 3.1)

Scientific classification
- Kingdom: Animalia
- Phylum: Chordata
- Class: Mammalia
- Order: Rodentia
- Family: Muridae
- Genus: Rattus
- Species: R. osgoodi

Binomial name
- Rattus osgoodi Musser & Newcomb, 1985

Species of rodent

Osgood's rat (Rattus osgoodi) is a species of rodent in the family Muridae. It is found only in Lâm Đồng Province in the Central Highlands (Tây Nguyên) of southern Vietnam. Its name references Wilfred Hudson Osgood.
