= Korinch's rat =

Conservation status
- Data Deficient (IUCN 3.1)

Scientific classification
- Kingdom: Animalia
- Phylum: Chordata
- Class: Mammalia
- Order: Rodentia
- Family: Muridae
- Genus: Rattus
- Species: R. korinchi

Binomial name
- Rattus korinchi (Robinson & Kloss, 1916)

Species of rodent

Korinch's rat (Rattus korinchi) is a species of rodent in the family Muridae. It is found only in western Sumatra, Indonesia, and is only known from Mount Kerinci and Mount Talakmau, where it is endemic to high elevations above 2000 m. It is only known from two museum specimens collected early in the 20th century. Genetic analysis indicate its closest relative is Rattus hoogerwerfi, another Sumatran mountain rat from which it diverged around 1.4 million years ago.
