= Nillu rat =

Conservation status
- Endangered (IUCN 3.1)

Scientific classification
- Kingdom: Animalia
- Phylum: Chordata
- Class: Mammalia
- Order: Rodentia
- Family: Muridae
- Genus: Rattus
- Species: R. montanus

Binomial name
- Rattus montanus Phillips, 1932
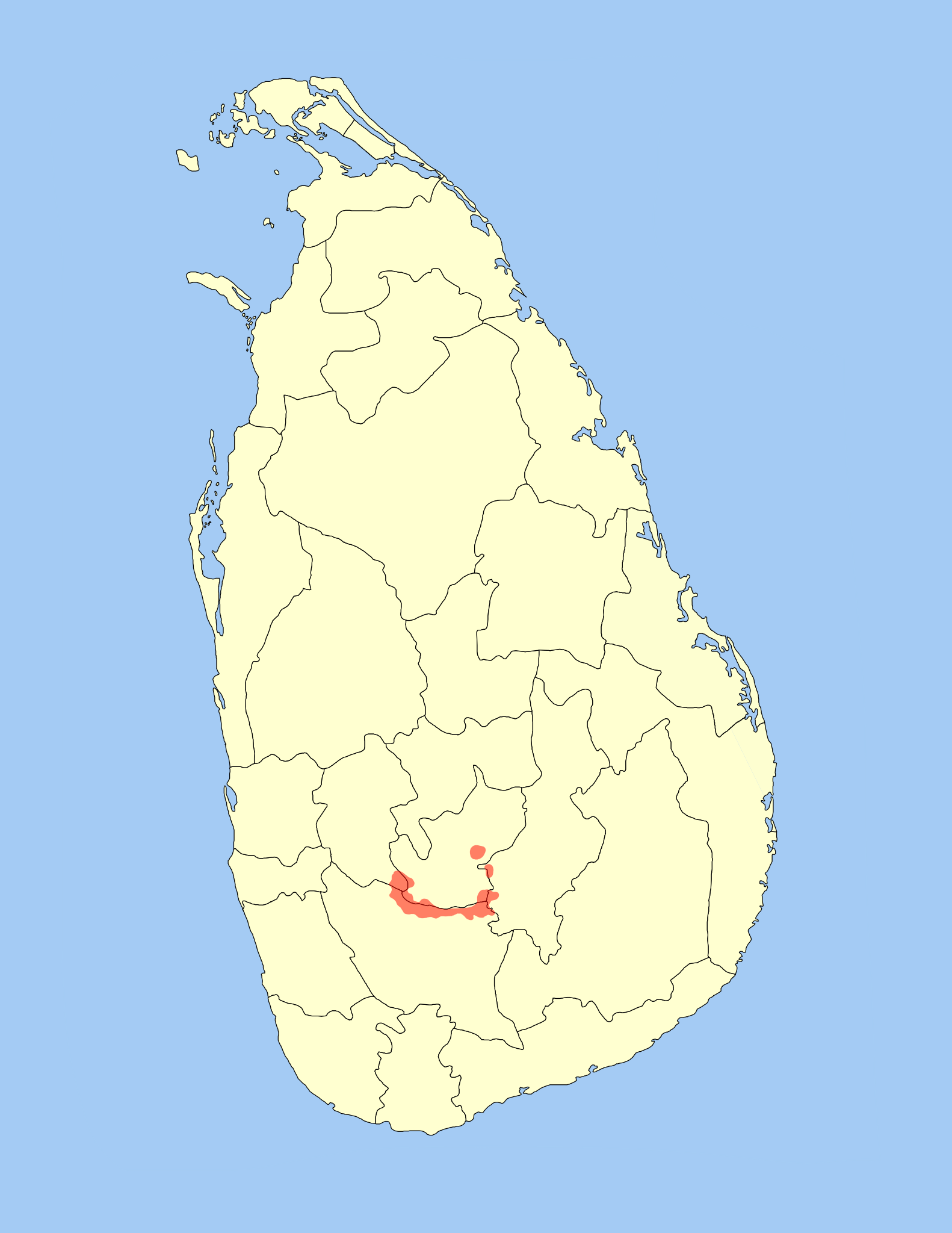

Species of rodent

The Nillu rat or Sri Lankan mountain rat (Rattus montanus) is a species of rodent in the family Muridae. It is found only in Sri Lanka where it is known as நில்ளு எலி (Nillu Eli) in Tamil and නෙලූ මීයා(Nelu Meeya) in Sinhalese.

== Range ==
The Nillu rat is only found in Knuckles, Horton Plains, Nuwara Eliya, and Ohiya in the central highlands of Central and Uva provinces of Sri Lanka.

== Description ==
Head and body length is 16–17 cm. Tail is 20–22 cm. Grayish brown with a reddish tinge dorsally, darkest along back. Underparts gray grading into whitish. Chin and upper throat white. Tail blackish brown with fine dark hairs. Long, shiny black whiskers. Fur soft and long, up to 45mm in length in back. Feet covered with short hairs.
