= Timor rat =

Conservation status
- Data Deficient (IUCN 3.1)

Scientific classification
- Kingdom: Animalia
- Phylum: Chordata
- Class: Mammalia
- Order: Rodentia
- Family: Muridae
- Genus: Rattus
- Species: R. timorensis

Binomial name
- Rattus timorensis Kitchener, Aplin & Boeadi, 1991

Species of rodent

The Timor rat (Rattus timorensis) is a species of rodent in the family Muridae found in Indonesian West Timor, where it lives in the teak forests. It is known from a specimen collected near the summit of Mount Mutis.
