= Van Deusen's rat =

Conservation status
- Endangered (IUCN 3.1)

Scientific classification
- Kingdom: Animalia
- Phylum: Chordata
- Class: Mammalia
- Order: Rodentia
- Family: Muridae
- Genus: Rattus
- Species: R. vandeuseni

Binomial name
- Rattus vandeuseni Taylor & Calaby, 1982

Synonyms
- Stenomys vandeuseni (Taylor & Calaby, 1982)

Species of rodent

Van Deusen's rat (Rattus vandeuseni) is a species of rodent in the family Muridae. It is endemic to the mountains of southeast Papua New Guinea.
