= Gag Island rat =

Conservation status
- Critically Endangered (IUCN 3.1)

Scientific classification
- Kingdom: Animalia
- Phylum: Chordata
- Class: Mammalia
- Order: Rodentia
- Family: Muridae
- Genus: Rattus
- Species: R. nikenii

Binomial name
- Rattus nikenii Maryanto, Sinaga, Achmadi, & Maharadatunkamsi, 2010

Species of rodent

The Gag Island rat or Niken's rat (Rattus nikenii) is a species of rodent in the family Muridae. It is endemic to Gag Island in West Papua, Indonesia.

It was described in 2010 after studies found it to be distinct in anatomy and coloration from other Papuan Rattus species. Although it is only known from Gag Island, it could potentially also be found on other islands in the Raja Ampat chain.

Although its habitat is protected to an extent, it is threatened by nickel mining on Gag Island; due to this, it is classified as Critically Endangered on the IUCN Red List.
