= New Guinean rat =

Conservation status
- Least Concern (IUCN 3.1)

Scientific classification
- Kingdom: Animalia
- Phylum: Chordata
- Class: Mammalia
- Order: Rodentia
- Family: Muridae
- Genus: Rattus
- Species: R. novaeguineae

Binomial name
- Rattus novaeguineae Taylor & Calaby, 1982

Species of rodent

The New Guinean rat (Rattus novaeguineae) is a species of rodent in the family Muridae. It is found only in parts of central Papua New Guinea.
