= Turkestan rat =

Conservation status
- Least Concern (IUCN 3.1)

Scientific classification
- Kingdom: Animalia
- Phylum: Chordata
- Class: Mammalia
- Order: Rodentia
- Family: Muridae
- Genus: Rattus
- Species: R. pyctoris

Binomial name
- Rattus pyctoris (Hodgson, 1845)

Synonyms
- Rattus rattoides (Hodgson, 1845); Rattus turkestanicus (Satunin, 1903)

Species of rodent

The Turkestan rat (Rattus pyctoris) is a species of rodent in the family Muridae.

== Distribution and habitat ==
The species is found throughout continental Asia from Afghanistan to China, at altitudes from 1,200 to 4,250 m. It occurs in montane areas, rocky habitats and frequently near or on cultivated or residential land.
