= Mentawai rat =

Conservation status
- Vulnerable (IUCN 3.1)

Scientific classification
- Kingdom: Animalia
- Phylum: Chordata
- Class: Mammalia
- Order: Rodentia
- Family: Muridae
- Genus: Rattus
- Species: R. lugens

Binomial name
- Rattus lugens (Miller, 1903)

Species of rodent

The Mentawai Archipelago rat (Rattus lugens) is a species of rodent in the family Muridae. It is found only in the Mentawai Islands of Indonesia, on the islands of Siberut, Sipora, Pagai Utara (North Pagai island), and Pagai Selatan (South Pagai island).
