= Vogelkop mountain rat =

Conservation status
- Data Deficient (IUCN 3.1)

Scientific classification
- Kingdom: Animalia
- Phylum: Chordata
- Class: Mammalia
- Order: Rodentia
- Family: Muridae
- Genus: Rattus
- Species: R. arfakiensis

Binomial name
- Rattus arfakiensis Rümmler, 1935

Species of rodent

The Vogelkop mountain rat, Rattus arfakiensis, is a species of rat native to Indonesia. It is found only in the Bird's Head Peninsula (possibly throughout the Arfak Mountains) of Papua Province, Indonesia.
