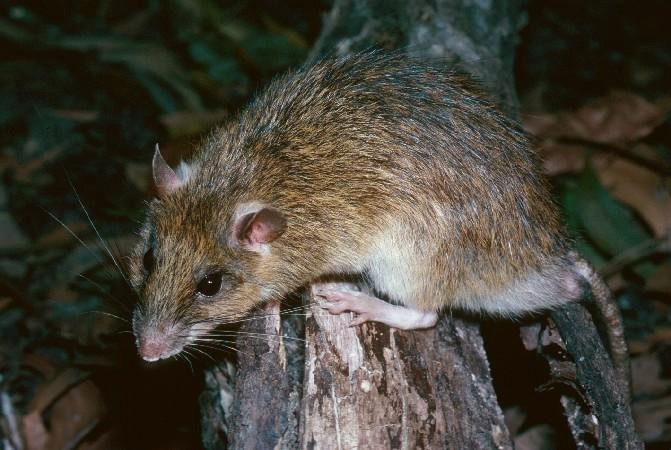
- Found in Indonesia

Conservation status
- Least Concern (IUCN 3.1)

Scientific classification
- Kingdom: Animalia
- Phylum: Chordata
- Class: Mammalia
- Order: Rodentia
- Family: Muridae
- Genus: Rattus
- Species: R. leucopus

Binomial name
- Rattus leucopus (Gray, 1867)

= Cape York rat =

Species of rodent

The Cape York rat (Rattus leucopus) is a species of rodent in the family Muridae. It is found in southern New Guinea, in both Indonesia and Papua New Guinea, and in Cape York Peninsula in Australia.
