= Moluccan prehensile-tailed rat =

Conservation status
- Least Concern (IUCN 3.1)

Scientific classification
- Kingdom: Animalia
- Phylum: Chordata
- Class: Mammalia
- Order: Rodentia
- Family: Muridae
- Genus: Rattus
- Species: R. morotaiensis

Binomial name
- Rattus morotaiensis Kellogg, 1945

Species of rodent

The Moluccan prehensile-tailed rat (Rattus morotaiensis) is a species of rodent in the family Muridae. It is found only in the Halmahera Islands of Indonesia, including Morotai, Halmahera, and Batjan islands.
