= Simalur rat =

Conservation status
- Endangered (IUCN 3.1)

Scientific classification
- Kingdom: Animalia
- Phylum: Chordata
- Class: Mammalia
- Order: Rodentia
- Family: Muridae
- Genus: Rattus
- Species: R. simalurensis

Binomial name
- Rattus simalurensis (Miller, 1903)

Species of rodent

The Simalur rat (Rattus simalurensis) is a species of rodent in the family Muridae. It is found only in Indonesia, on Simalur island and the nearby islands of Siumat, Lasia, and Babi
