= Western New Guinea mountain rat =

Conservation status
- Least Concern (IUCN 3.1)

Scientific classification
- Kingdom: Animalia
- Phylum: Chordata
- Class: Mammalia
- Order: Rodentia
- Family: Muridae
- Genus: Rattus
- Species: R. arrogans

Binomial name
- Rattus arrogans Thomas, 1922

Species of rodent

The western New Guinea mountain rat (Rattus arrogans) is a species of rodent in the family Muridae. It is widespread in the mountains of central and western New Guinea.
