= Andaman rat =

Conservation status
- Vulnerable (IUCN 3.1)

Scientific classification
- Domain: Eukaryota
- Kingdom: Animalia
- Phylum: Chordata
- Class: Mammalia
- Order: Rodentia
- Family: Muridae
- Genus: Rattus
- Species: R. stoicus

Binomial name
- Rattus stoicus (Miller, 1902)

Species of rodent

The Andaman rat (Rattus stoicus) is a species of rodent in the family Muridae. It is endemic to the Andaman Islands, where it has been recorded on Henry Lawrence Island, South Andaman, and Middle Andaman. It is a nocturnal species that lives in tropical evergreen forests from sea level to 200 m (660 ft) above sea level.
