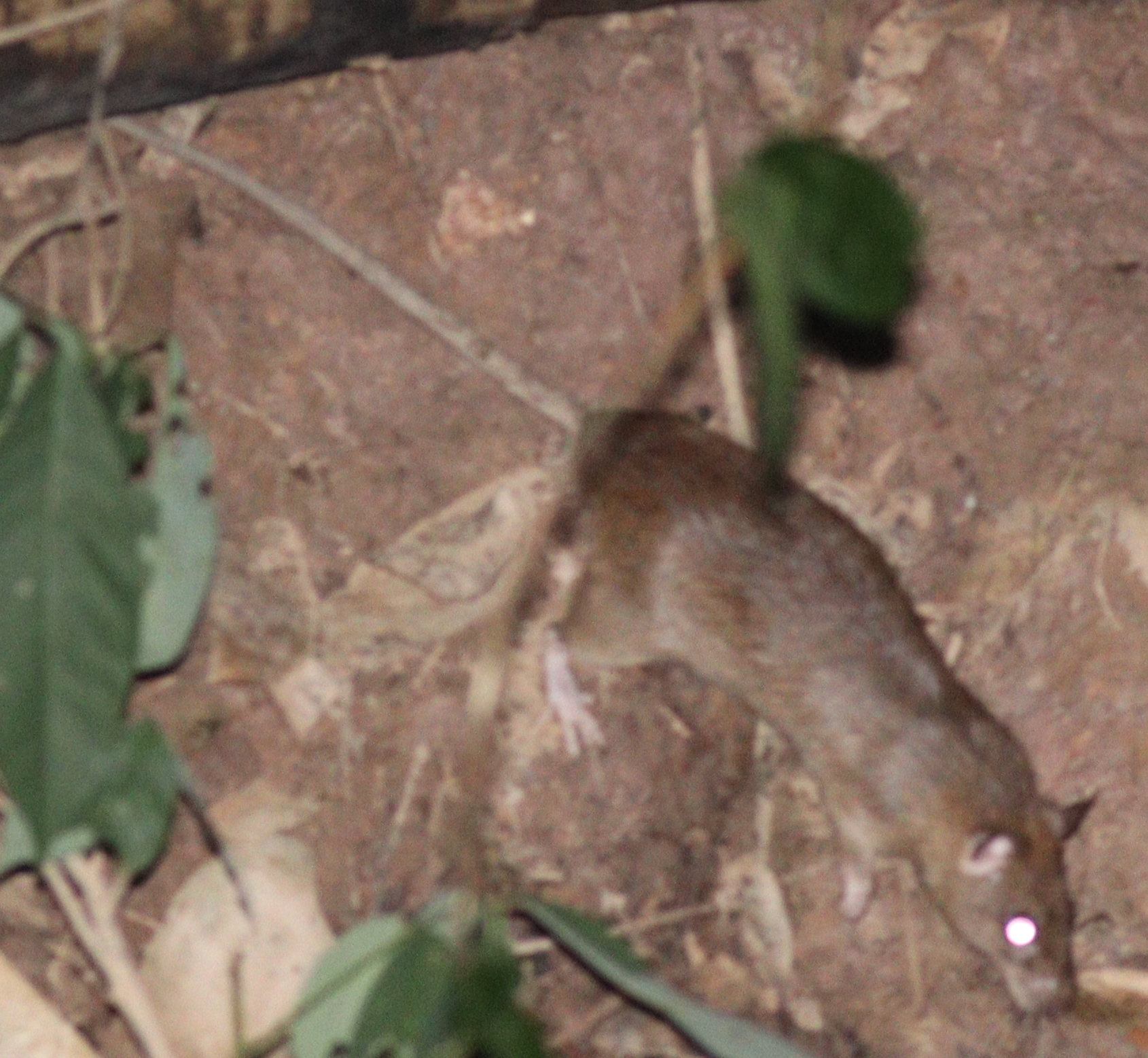

Conservation status
- Least Concern (IUCN 3.1)

Scientific classification
- Kingdom: Animalia
- Phylum: Chordata
- Class: Mammalia
- Order: Rodentia
- Family: Muridae
- Genus: Rattus
- Species: R. losea

Binomial name
- Rattus losea (R. Swinhoe, 1871)
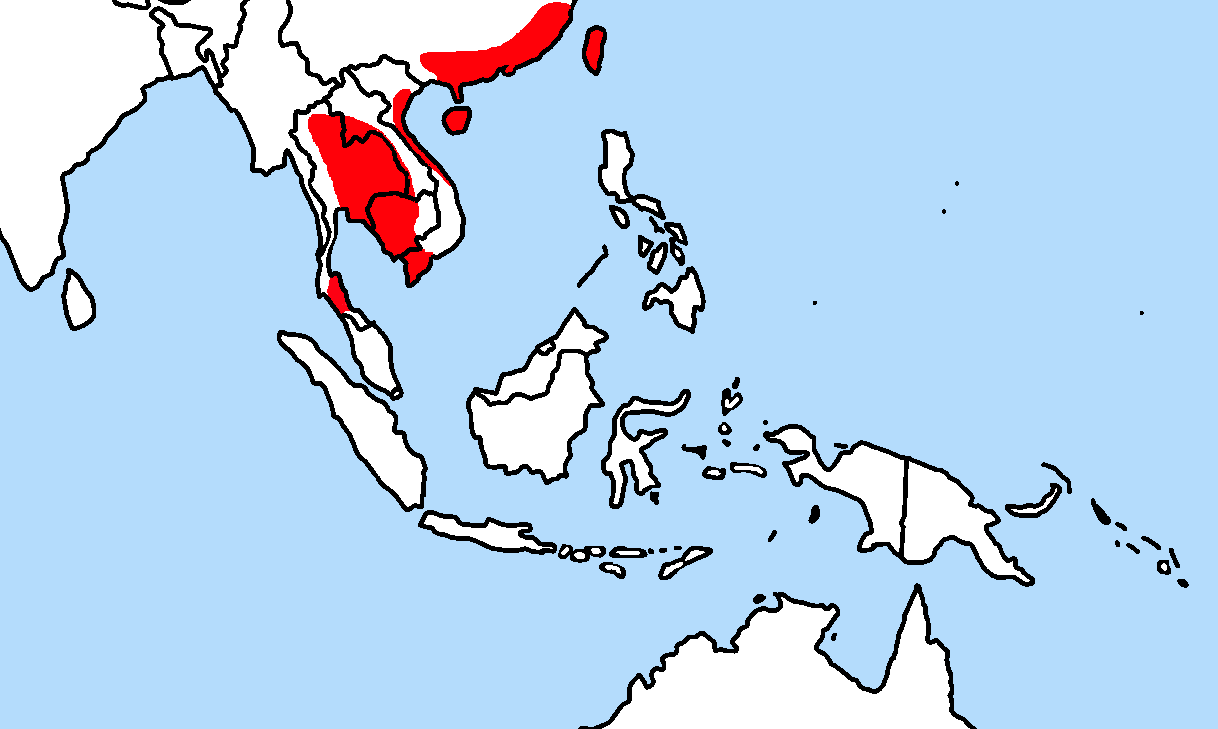

= Lesser ricefield rat =

Lesser rice-field rat

Species of rodent

The lesser ricefield rat (Rattus losea) is a species of rodent in the family Muridae. It was first described by Robert Swinhoe in 1871 and is found in China, Laos, Taiwan, Thailand, and Vietnam.
