= Yellow-tailed rat =

- Stuffed specimen

Conservation status
- Least Concern (IUCN 3.1)

Scientific classification
- Kingdom: Animalia
- Phylum: Chordata
- Class: Mammalia
- Order: Rodentia
- Family: Muridae
- Genus: Rattus
- Species: R. xanthurus

Binomial name
- Rattus xanthurus (Gray, 1867)

Synonyms
- Mus xanthura Gray, 1867; Taeromys paraxanthus Sody, 1941; Mus faberi Jentink, 1883

Species of rodent

The yellow-tailed rat (Rattus xanthurus) is a species of rodent in the family Muridae. It is found only in northeastern Sulawesi, Indonesia.
