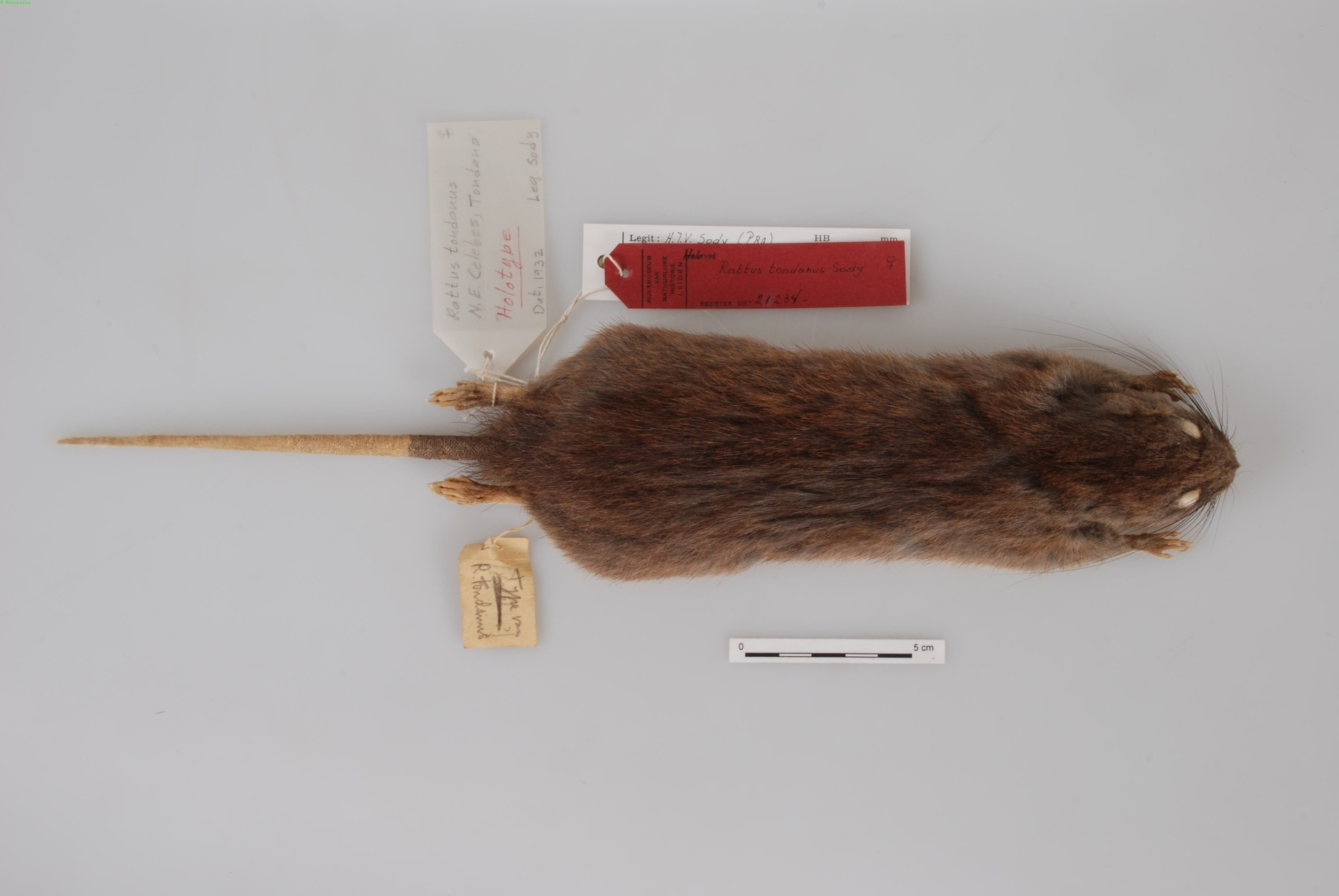

Conservation status
- Least Concern (IUCN 3.1)

Scientific classification
- Kingdom: Animalia
- Phylum: Chordata
- Class: Mammalia
- Infraclass: Placentalia
- Order: Rodentia
- Family: Muridae
- Genus: Rattus
- Species: R. marmosurus

Binomial name
- Rattus marmosurus Thomas, 1921

= Opossum rat =

Species of rodent

The opossum rat (Rattus marmosurus) is a species of rodent in the family Muridae. It is found only in northern and central Sulawesi, Indonesia.
