= Kerala rat =

Conservation status
- Endangered (IUCN 3.1)

Scientific classification
- Kingdom: Animalia
- Phylum: Chordata
- Class: Mammalia
- Order: Rodentia
- Family: Muridae
- Genus: Rattus
- Species: R. ranjiniae

Binomial name
- Rattus ranjiniae Agrawal & Ghosal, 1969

Species of rodent

The Kerala rat or Ranjini's field rat, (Rattus ranjiniae) is a species of rodent in the family Muridae found only in Kerala, India. In Kerala, it is known only from fragmented locations in Alappuzha, Thrissur, and Thiruvananthapuram. Its natural habitats are subtropical or tropical dry lowland grassland and swamps.
