= Moss-forest rat =

Conservation status
- Least Concern (IUCN 3.1)

Scientific classification
- Domain: Eukaryota
- Kingdom: Animalia
- Phylum: Chordata
- Class: Mammalia
- Order: Rodentia
- Family: Muridae
- Genus: Rattus
- Species: R. niobe

Binomial name
- Rattus niobe (Thomas, 1906)

Synonyms
- Stenomys niobe Thomas, 1906

Species of rodent

The moss-forest rat (Rattus niobe) is a species of rodent in the family Muridae. It is found in Indonesia and Papua New Guinea.

== Names ==
It is known as katgn in the Kalam language of Papua New Guinea.
