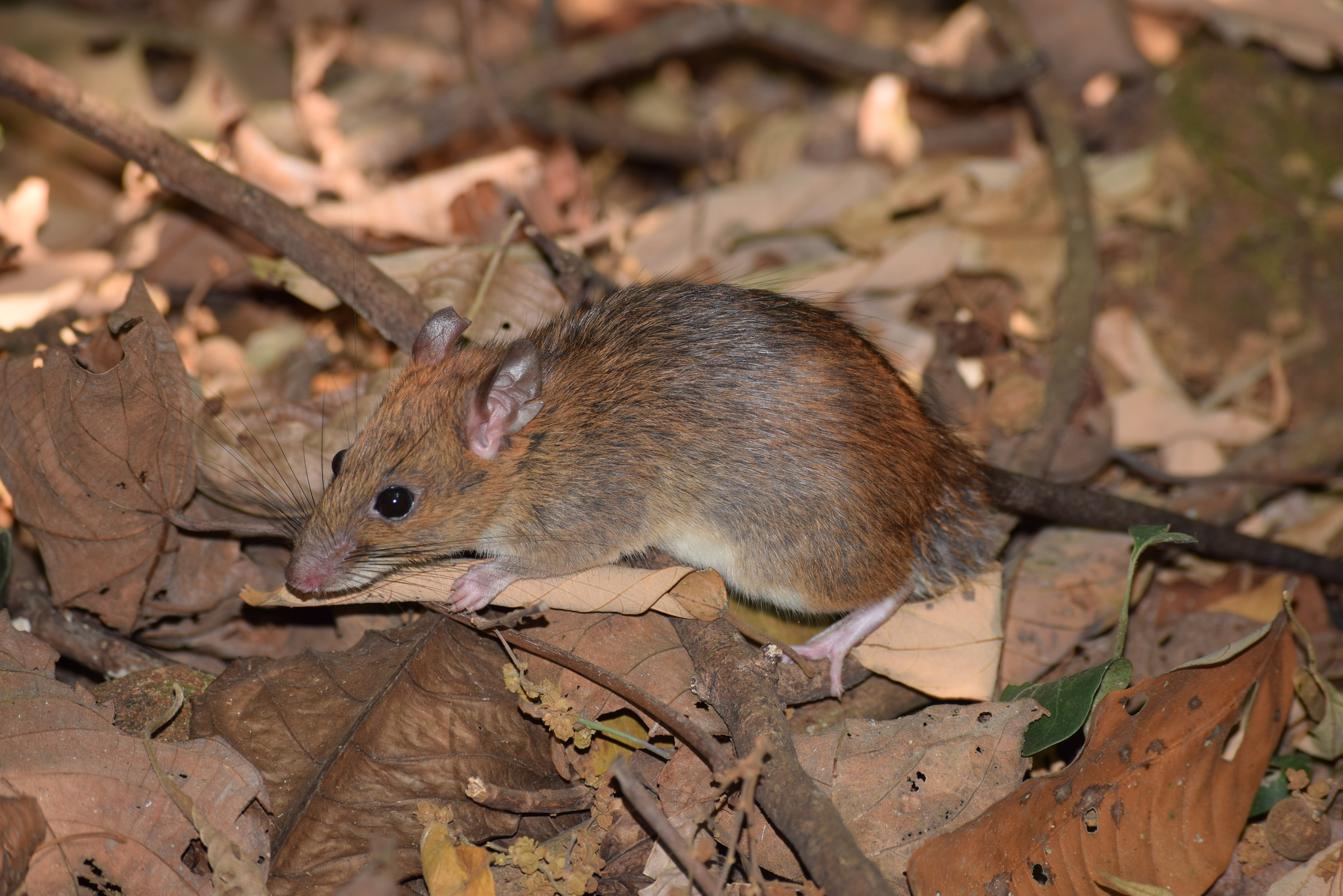

Conservation status
- Vulnerable (IUCN 3.1)

Scientific classification
- Kingdom: Animalia
- Phylum: Chordata
- Class: Mammalia
- Order: Rodentia
- Family: Muridae
- Genus: Rattus
- Species: R. satarae

Binomial name
- Rattus satarae Hinton, 1918

= Sahyadris forest rat =

Species of rodent

The Sahyadris forest rat (Rattus satarae) is a species of rat belonging to the family Muridae. It is native to the northern Western Ghats in India where it is split between three regions, Satara in Maharashtra, the Nilgiri mountains in Tamil Nadu and Kodagu district in Karnataka.

== Vulnerability ==
R. satarae is listed as vulnerable by the IUCN due to it being restricted to less than 2,000 km^{2} of forest habitat that remains. The locations it is found in are highly fragmented and it is vulnerable to changes in its habitat. The species is facing a decline in the quality of its habitat and the number of mature individuals in the population. It is highly sensitive to changes in its habitat. The main threats faced by the species include loss of forests to plantations, logging, pesticide use, and planting of exotic species.

== Habitat ==
The species has only been seen in the moist deciduous and evergreen forests of the northern Western Ghats are of India, between 700 and 2,150 m in altitude. It lives almost exclusively in nests or burrows in the middle or high canopy, only occasionally going to the ground near the base of a tree or vine. It eats fruits and insects.

== Appearance ==
R. satarae has a long, soft coat with a golden brown back and white underside. Its tail is very long. It was originally described as a subspecies of the black rat (Rattus rattus) due to its similar appearance. However, DNA evidence has shown that they are two distinct species with no interbreeding despite them occupying the same habitat. Their similarities are thought to be due to convergence as a result of sharing the same ecological niche.
