= Sikkim rat =

Conservation status
- Least Concern (IUCN 3.1)

Scientific classification
- Kingdom: Animalia
- Phylum: Chordata
- Class: Mammalia
- Order: Rodentia
- Family: Muridae
- Genus: Rattus
- Species: R. andamanensis

Binomial name
- Rattus andamanensis (Blyth, 1860)

Synonyms
- R. sikkimensis Hinton, 1919

Species of rodent

The Sikkim rat (Rattus andamanensis) is a species of rodent in the family Muridae.

It is found in Bhutan, Cambodia, China, India, Laos, Myanmar, Nepal, Thailand, and Vietnam. The rat's coloring is brownish upperparts and a white underside. The mitochondrial genome of Rattus andamanensis has 2 rRNA genes, 22 tRNA genes, and 13 protein-coding genes, for a total of 37 genes, which is similar to that of other vertebrates.
