= Malayan field rat =

Conservation status
- Least Concern (IUCN 3.1)

Scientific classification
- Kingdom: Animalia
- Phylum: Chordata
- Class: Mammalia
- Order: Rodentia
- Family: Muridae
- Genus: Rattus
- Species: R. tiomanicus

Binomial name
- Rattus tiomanicus (Miller, 1900)
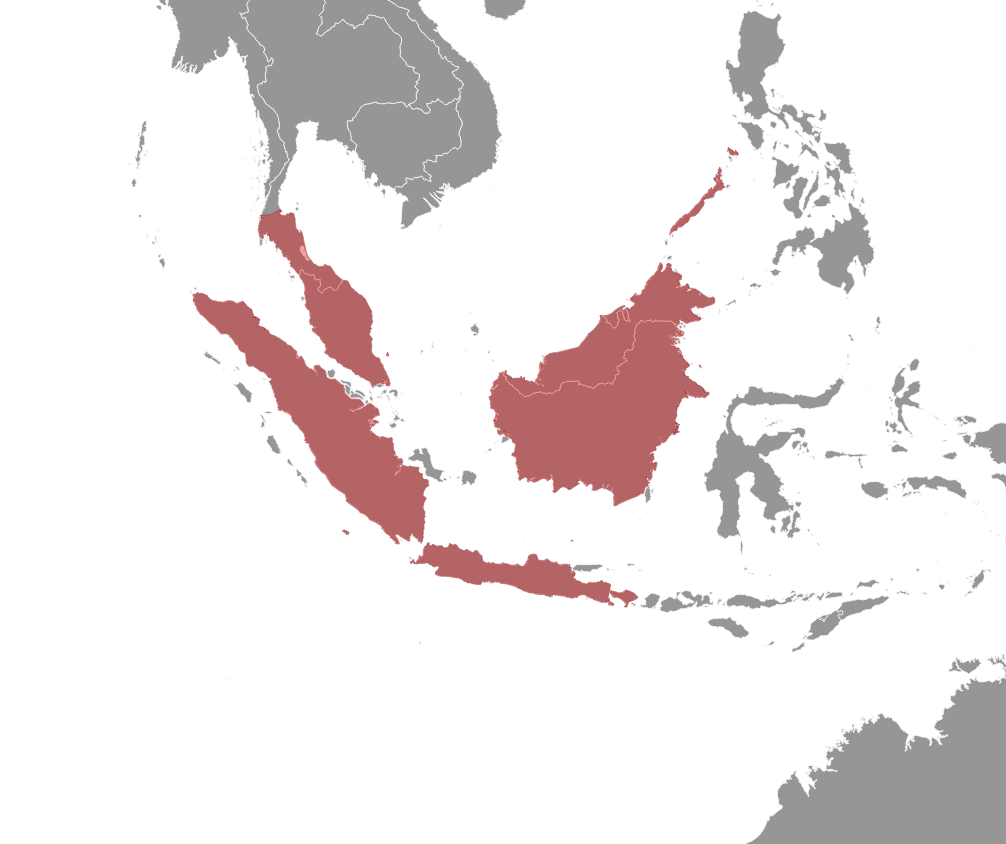

Species of rodent

The Malayan field rat, Malaysian field rat or Malaysian wood rat, (Rattus tiomanicus) is a species of rodent in the family Muridae. It is nocturnal and mainly arboreal and is found in Malaysia, Thailand, Indonesia and the Philippines. It is a common species and the International Union for Conservation of Nature has assessed it as being of "least concern".

== Description ==
The Malayan field rat has a head-and-body length of 140 to 190 mm (5.5 to 7.5 in) and a tail 150 to 200 mm (6 to 8 in). It has a weight of between 55 and 150 g (2 and 5 oz). The ears are large and nearly naked. The fur is smooth and flattened, interspersed with short spines. The dorsal pelage is a grizzled olive-brown with scattered medium-length black guard hairs, and the underparts are whitish. The tail, which is a similar length to the body, is a uniform dark brown. The feet are broad, and the soles have fine ridges for climbing. It differs from Annandale's rat (Rattus annandalei) in having sleek fur with spines and fewer mammae, and from the ricefield rat (Rattus argentiventer) in having plain white underparts and lacking an orange spot in front of the ear.

== Distribution and habitat ==
The Malayan field rat is known from Malaysia, Thailand, Sumatra, Borneo, the Philippines and many smaller islands. Its typical habitat is primary and secondary forest, including coastal forest but it is seldom found in dipterocarp forests. It is also found in plantations, shrubby areas, grassland and gardens, but seldom invades buildings.

== Behaviour ==
The Malayan field rat is nocturnal. It climbs well and spends much of its time in trees as well as foraging on the ground. It hides in log piles, heaps of palm fronds, under fallen logs and in the crowns of palm trees. It feeds on both vegetable and animal matter, with oil palm fruits forming part of its diet.

== Status ==
The Malayan field rat is an abundant and adaptable species with a very wide range, a large total population and an ability to live in a number of different environments. No particular threats have been identified, and in some areas it is regarded as a pest. The International Union for Conservation of Nature has assessed its conservation status as being of "least concern".
