= Palm rat =

Conservation status
- Vulnerable (IUCN 3.1)

Scientific classification
- Kingdom: Animalia
- Phylum: Chordata
- Class: Mammalia
- Order: Rodentia
- Family: Muridae
- Genus: Rattus
- Species: R. palmarum

Binomial name
- Rattus palmarum (Zelebor, 1869)

Species of rodent

The palm rat (Rattus palmarum) is a species of rodent in the family Muridae. It is found in the Nicobar Islands, on Car Nicobar and Great Nicobar islands.

The palm rat's natural habitats are subtropical or tropical dry forest and subtropical or tropical mangrove forest.
