= Sulawesi montane rain forests =

Ecoregion in Sulawesi, Indonesia

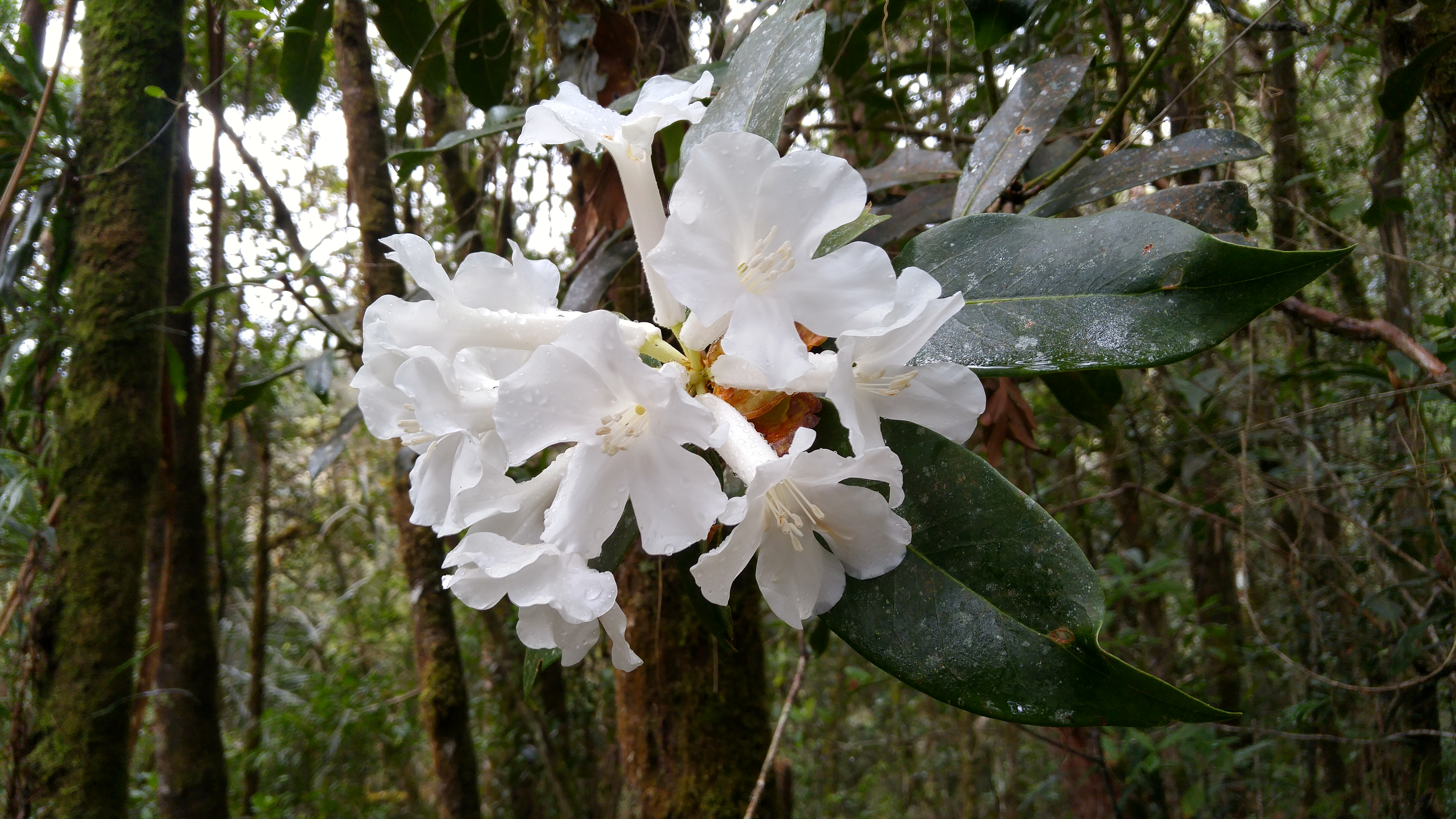
- Rhododendron on Mount Latimojong, South Sulawesi

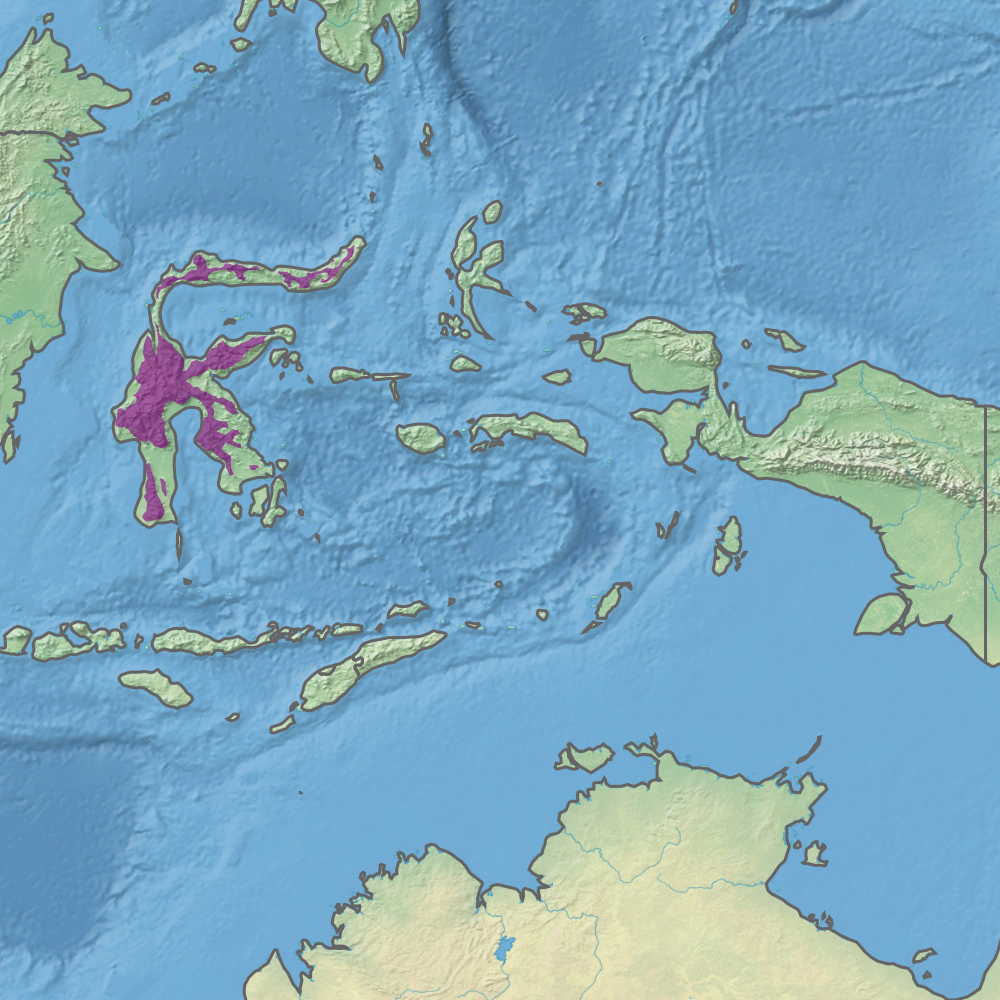
- Ecoregion territory (in purple)

Ecology
- Realm: Australasian realm
- Biome: tropical and subtropical moist broadleaf forests
- Borders: Sulawesi lowland rain forests

Geography
- Area: 75,472 km^{2} (29,140 mi^{2})
- Countries: Indonesia
- Province: Central Sulawesi; Gorontalo; North Maluku; North Sulawesi; South Sulawesi; Southeast Sulawesi, West Sulawesi
- Coordinates: 1.9°S 120.2°E

Conservation
- Conservation status: Relatively stable/intact
- Global 200: Sulawesi moist forests
- Protected: 9,066 km² (12%)

The Sulawesi montane rain forests is a tropical moist forest ecoregion in Indonesia. It includes the highlands of Sulawesi.

== Geography ==
Sulawesi, with an area of 180,681 km^{2}, is the fourth-largest island in Indonesia, and the eleventh-largest in the world. The landmass of Sulawesi includes four peninsulas: the northern Minahasa Peninsula, the East Peninsula, the South Peninsula, and the Southeast Peninsula. The island is mountainous, and the highest peak is Mount Latimojong at 3,478 meters. Approximately 40% of Sulawesi's land area is in the montane rain forests ecoregion; the surrounding lowlands are in the Sulawesi lowland rain forests ecoregion.

The islands that make up the ecoregion are part of Wallacea, a group of islands that are part of the Australasian realm, but were never joined to either the Australian or Asian continents. The islands of Wallacea are home to a mix of plants and animals from both terrestrial realms, and have many unique species that evolved in isolation. The Makassar Strait separates Sulawesi from Borneo to the west; the strait is part of the Wallace Line, which demarcates the western boundary of Wallacea. Borneo and the other Indonesian islands west of Sulawesi are part of Sundaland, and were connected to the Asian continent when sea levels were lower during the ice ages.

== Climate ==
The ecoregion has a wet tropical montane climate.

== Flora ==
The main plant communities are lower montane rain forest, upper montane rain forest, and sub-alpine forests. The forests generally form a closed canopy, and height decreases with elevation.

Lower montane rain forest, or sub-montane forest, ranges from 1000 to 1500 meters elevation. Trees in the beech family (Fagaceae) are predominant, including four species of Lithocarpus and two species of Castanopsis (Castanopsis acuminatissima and C. buruana). Other trees include Eugenia, along with trees in the myrtle family (Myrtaceae), laurel family (Lauraceae), and tea family (Theaceae) and the conifers Agathis dammara and Phyllocladus. Epiphytes including orchids are common. In the mid-montane forests (1500–2000 meters elevation) Fagaceae, especially Lithocarpus menadoensis and L. celebicus, Myrtaceae, and Agathis are predominant.

Upper montane forests are characterized by conifers, including species of Agathis, Podocarpus, Dacrycarpus, Dacrydium, and Phyllocladus, together with Myrtaceae and the shrubs Rhododendron, Vaccinium, Gaultheria, and Tasmannia piperita. Fagaceae are less common than in the lower-elevation forests. Mosses become abundant over 2000 meters elevation.

Sub-alpine communities form above 3200 meters elevation, with low trees and shrubs, principally Rhododendron, Decaspermum, and Hedyotis, along with the lower shrubs Gaultheria and Acrothamnus suaveolens. The trees and shrubs are festooned with lichens. Herbs include the daisy Keysseria, the ginger Alpinia, Potentilla leuconata and P. parvus, and the grasses Poa and Agrostis.

== Fauna ==
The ecoregion is home to 102 mammal species, a third of which are endemic or near-endemic. 24 mammal species are endemic to the ecoregion, and 10 are near-endemic.

Larger mammals include two pigs, the Celebes warty pig (Sus celebensis) and North Sulawesi babirusa (Babyrousa celebensis). The Celebes warty pig lives in the lower montane and lowland rain forests of Sulawesi and other islands of Wallacea. The North Sulawesi babirusa lives in both the montane and lowland rain forests of northern and central Sulawesi. The endemic Mountain anoa (Bubalus quarlesi) is a dwarf buffalo which stands only 70 cm (28 in) high. The Celebes rusa deer (Rusa timorensis macassaricus) is a subspecies of the Javan rusa, which may have been introduced from Sundaland to Sulawesi by humans in ancient times.

There are two endemic arboreal primates, Dian's tarsier (Tarsius dentatus) and the Pygmy tarsier (Tarsius pumilus).

The majority of endemic species are rodents, including three squirrels and 17 Murid rodents:

- montane long-nosed squirrel (Hyosciurus heinrichi)
- secretive dwarf squirrel (Prosciurillus abstrusus)
- Weber's dwarf squirrel (Prosciurillus weberi)
- little soft-furred rat (Rattus mollicomulus)
- opossum rat (Rattus marmosurus)
- Dollman's spiny rat (Maxomys dollmani)
- Watts's spiny rat (Maxomys wattsi)
- Celebes shrew-rat (Crunomys celebensis)
- long-headed hill rat (Bunomys prolatus)
- fraternal hill rat (Bunomys fratrorum)
- Heinrich's hill rat (Bunomys heinrichi)
- inland hill rat (Bunomys penitus)
- Sulawesi soft-furred rat (Eropeplus canus)
- elegant margareta rat (Margaretamys elegans)
- little margareta rat (Margaretamys parvus)
- Salokko rat) (Taeromys arcuatus)
- Sulawesi montane rat (Taeromys hamatus)
- Sulawesian shrew rat (Melasmothrix naso)
- Tate's shrew rat (Tateomys rhinogradoides)
- long-tailed shrew rat (Tateomys macrocercus)

Another ten species are Sulawesi endemics, which live in both the montane and lowland rain forests ecoregions:

- Sulawesi palm civet (Macrogalidia musschenbroekii)
- Elongated shrew (Crocidura elongata)
- Sulawesi shrew (Crocidura lea)
- Sulawesi tiny shrew (Crocidura levicula)
- Crested roundleaf bat (Hipposideros inexpectatus)
- Minahassa pipistrelle (Pipistrellus minahassae)
- Gaskell's false serotine (Hesperoptenus gaskelli)
- Yellow-tailed rat (Rattus xanthurus)
- Celebes crested macaque (Macaca nigra)
- North Sulawesi babirusa (Babyrousa celebensis)

The Bola Batu babirusa (Babyrousa bolabatuensis), known only from bones, is recognized as a separate species. No living individuals have been recorded, and the species may be extinct.

The ecoregion is home to 168 bird species. 19 species are endemic to the ecoregion, and another 23 are near-endemic.

== Protected areas ==
A 2017 assessment found that 9,066 km^{2}, or 12%, of the ecoregion is in protected areas.

Protected areas in or partly in the ecoregion include:

- Gunung Ambang Nature Recreation Park
- Panua Nature Reserve
- Gunung Lokon Nature Reserve
- Gunung Sojol Nature Reserve
- Pegunungan Faruhumpenai Nature Reserve
- Pangi Binangga Nature Reserve
- Pamona Nature Reserve
- Gunung Dako Nature Reserve
- Tinombala Nature Reserve
- Faruhumpenai Nature Reserve
- Lore Lindu National Park
- Rawa Aopa Watumohai National Park
- Bogani Nani Wartabone National Park
- Bantimurung Bulusaraung National Park
- Ganda Dewata National Park
- Gunung Ambang Nature Reserve
- Morowali Nature Reserve
- Nantu Wildlife Reserve
- Nantu Wildlife Reserve
- Komara Wildlife Reserve
- Nantu Boliyohuto National Park
- Bantimurung Nature Recreation Park
- Gunung Tinombala Nature Reserve
- Danau Matano Nature Recreation Park
- Danau Towuti Nature Recreation Park
- Nanggala III Nature Recreation Park
- Cani Sirenreng Nature Recreation Park
- Malino Nature Recreation Park
- Mangolo Nature Recreation Park
- Lejja Nature Recreation Park
- Banggai Kepulauan Nature Recreation Park
- Sulawesi Tengah Grand Forest Park
- Abdul Latief/Sinjai Grand Forest Park
