= Christine's margareta rat =

Scientific classification
- Kingdom: Animalia
- Phylum: Chordata
- Class: Mammalia
- Order: Rodentia
- Family: Muridae
- Genus: Margaretamys
- Species: M. christinae

Binomial name
- Margaretamys christinae Mortelliti, Castiglia, Amori, Maryanto & Musser, 2012
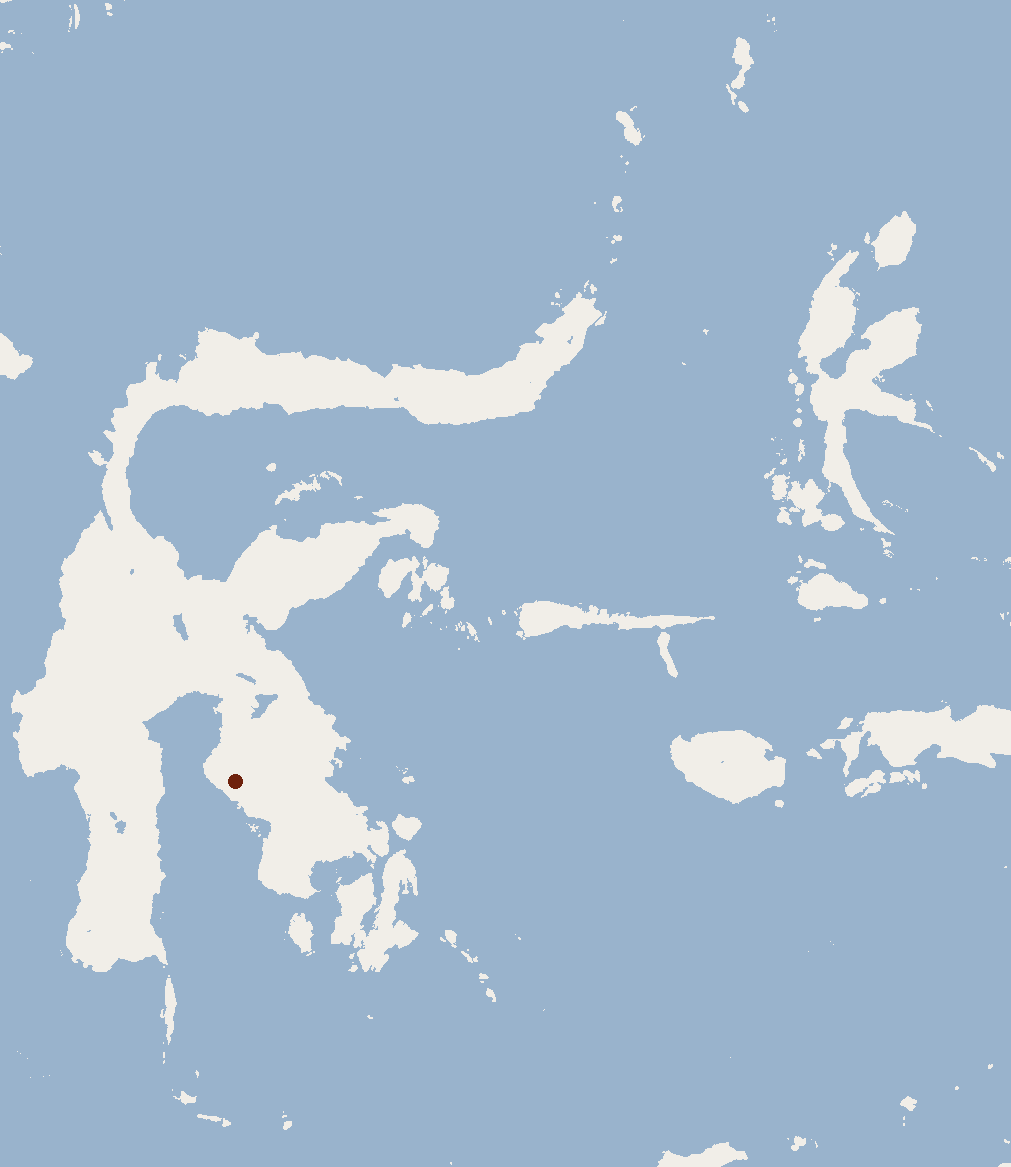
- Geographical distribution of Margaretamys christinae, c.2013

Species of rodent

Christine's margareta rat (Margaretamys christinae) is a species of rodent in the family Muridae. It is found only in Indonesia on the island of Sulawesi, in a mountainous part of the southeastern peninsula. It was first discovered by an expedition led by Alessio Mortelliti in 2011.

== Taxonomy ==
Christine's margareta rat belongs to the genus Margaretamys in the Old World rats and mice subfamily Murinae of the family Muridae. It was discovered in 2011 and was first described in 2012 by Alessio Mortelliti, Riccardo Castiglia, Giovanni Amori, Ibnu Maryanto and Guy G. Musser. Mortelliti, from the Sapienza University of Rome, who discovered the new species, named it after Christina Thwaites, another member of the expedition.

== Description ==
Christine's margareta rat grows to a head-and-body length of about 110 mm (4.3 in) with a tail length of 175 mm (7 in). The muzzle is greyish white, the whiskers are long and the ears are large, brown and sparsely haired. The fur is long, soft and dense and the dorsal colouring is dark reddish brown. The underparts are greyish yellow, except the chin and throat, which are greyish white. The legs are brown while the fingers and toes are white. The tail is greyish brown, with the last third white. The scales on the tail each bear three hairs, and these increase in length towards the tip, where they form a terminal tuft. This species is distinguished from other members of its genus found on Sulawesi by its small size, its soft reddish-brown upper parts, greyish-buff underparts and long, bicoloured tail with a tufted tip.

== Ecology ==
Although the ecology of this species has not been studied, it is likely to be similar to the other three species of Margaretamys which are also endemic to Sulawesi. They are nocturnal and live on the ground or in the forest understory (Christine's margareta rat was trapped 1.5 m (5 ft) off the ground). They feed largely on fruit and insects and have litters of one or two young.

== Status ==
Christine's margareta rat is known from a single specimen collected in the Mekongga mountain range in the rainforest at an altitude of about 1,537 m (5,043 ft). Much of Sulawesi has been logged for timber and to make way for cacao plantations, and the locality of capture of the new species was in secondary forest. The forested mountains are separated by deep valleys which would be unlikely to provide suitable habitat. It seems likely that this species exists in a number of separate subpopulations and occupies a total area of less than 1,000 square kilometres (390 sq mi). Its conservation status is provisionally assessed as being "Endangered".
