= Tondano rat =

Conservation status
- Vulnerable (IUCN 3.1)

Scientific classification
- Kingdom: Animalia
- Phylum: Chordata
- Class: Mammalia
- Order: Rodentia
- Family: Muridae
- Genus: Taeromys
- Species: T. taerae

Binomial name
- Taeromys taerae (Sody, 1932)
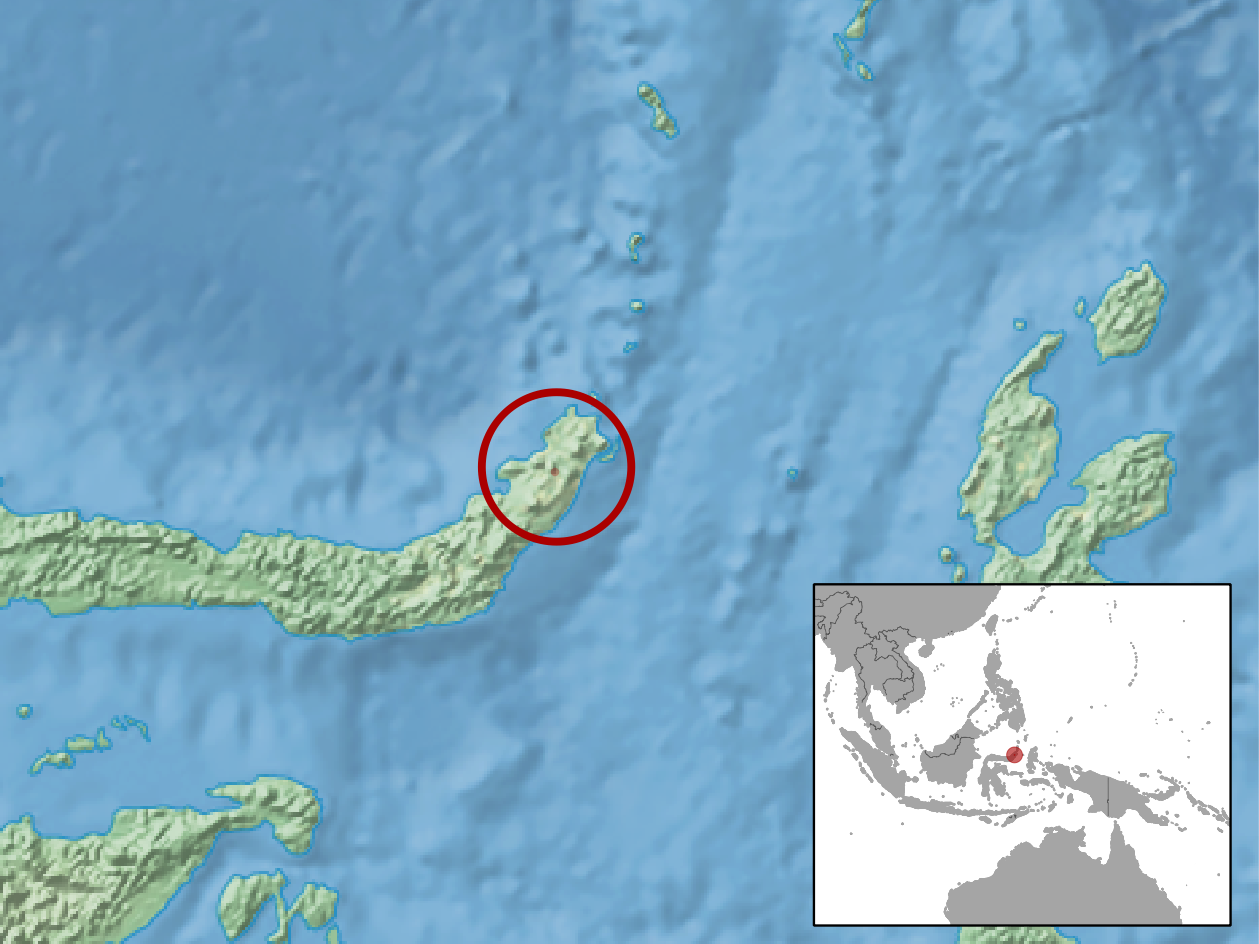

Species of rodent

The Tondano rat (Taeromys taerae) is a species of rodent in the family Muridae. It is found only in Indonesia. Taeromys taerae is found in the highlands of northeastern Sulawesi. The rat is a morphological relative of T. hamatus, which is found only in central Sulawesian mountains.
