= Gunung Ambang Nature Reserve =

Protected area in Sulawesi, Indonesia

- Mount Ambang Nature Reserve
- IUCN category III (natural monument or feature)
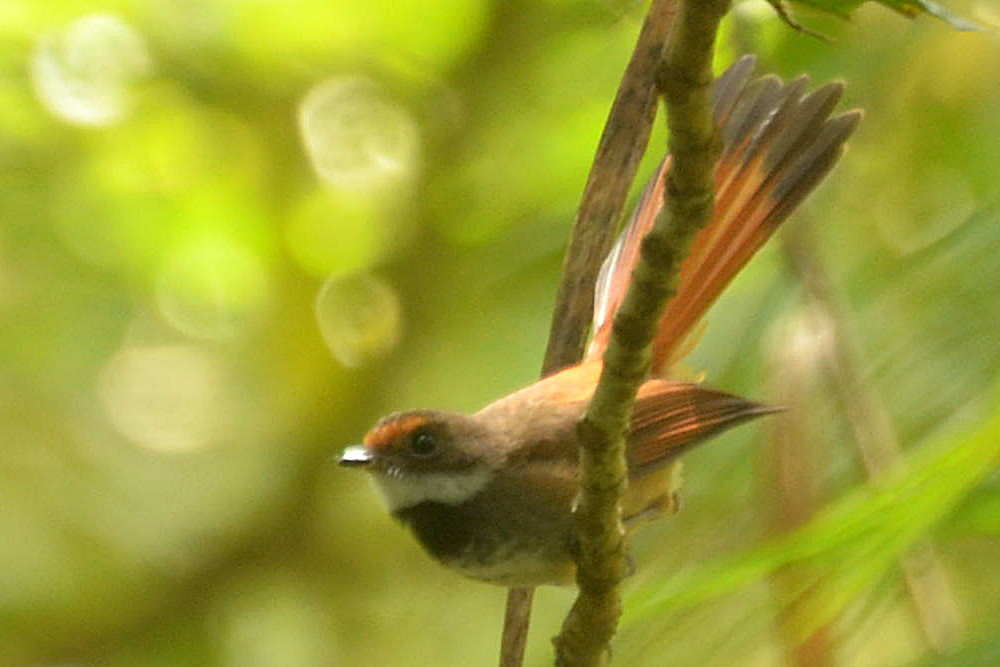
- Rusty-bellied fantail (Rhipidura teysmanni toradja) at Gunung Ambang Nature Reserve
- Location: North Sulawesi, Indonesia
- Designation: Nature reserve
- Governing body: Balai Besar Konservasi Sumber Daya Alam Sulawesi Selatan

Gunung Ambang Nature Reserve is a preserved area in the north of the island of Sulawesi in Indonesia. It is in a mountainous, little-explored region and contains a large number of indigenous plants and animals.

== Geography ==
The Gunung Ambang Nature Reserve has an area of about 8,000 hectares and is situated close to the equator in the mountainous area to the east of Bogani Nani Wartabone National Park in the northern peninsula of Sulawesi. It ranges in elevation from 700 m (2,297 ft) to the summit of Mount Moyayat at 1,760 m (5,774 ft) andconsists mostly of valleys and steep-sided mountains. The lower parts are covered by evergreen rainforest with few palms and a canopy of up to 25 m (82 ft) with some emergent trees. In the higher parts the trees are not so tall and there is a dense understorey of palms and other vegetation. There are a number of marshes and small lakes and, particularly near the edge of the park, trees have been felled and there are clearings and the growth of secondary forest.

The reserve is best accessed from the village of Singsingon, which is an hour's drive from Kotamobagu. Visitors need a permit to visit the park and these can be obtained from the National Park Office in Kotamobagu.

== Flora and fauna ==
Trees in the lowland rainforest area of the reserve include Calophyllum, Eugenia, Knema, Litsea, Sterculia insularis, Acalypha caturus and Cryptocarya celebicum with the largest trees being Pometia pinnata, Endospermum peltatum and Canarium asperum. On higher slopes Eugenia sp., Lithocarpus celebicus, Lithocarpus bancanus, Calophyllum treubii, Calophyllum soulattri, Derris dalbergoides and Vaccinium sp. predominated with an understorey which included many palms.

The Gunung Ambang Nature Reserve is of particular interest to bird watchers and many species of bird endemic to Sulawesi can be seen here. One of the rarest is the cinnabar hawk owl, first described in 1999. Other nocturnal birds include the Sulawesi masked owl, the Sulawesi scops owl and the great eared nightjar.

A number of species of flycatcher can be seen in the canopy, often in mixed-species flocks, a rarity being the Matinan blue flycatcher. More common species include the citrine canary-flycatcher, the snowy-browed flycatcher, the little pied flycatcher and the turquoise flycatcher. Also present in these flocks among the trees are the sulphur-vented whistler, the Sulawesi babbler, the streak-headed white-eye, the crimson-crowned flowerpecker, the cerulean cuckooshrike and the Sulawesi leaf warbler. Also often present nearby are the scarlet myzomela and the dark-eared myza. The call of Malia grata can often be heard, and the Sulawesi drongo, the yellow-billed malkoha and the Sulawesi fantail are also present. The purple-bearded bee-eater is an elusive denizen of woodland verges and open areas and the olive-flanked whistler is a rare upland species. Other birds that occur in the forest under-storey and on the ground include the mountain tailorbird and the scaly-breasted kingfisher.

Raptors are chiefly found at the edge of the forest and in areas under cultivation. In the upland areas of the nature reserve are pigeons, lorikeets, parrots, including the golden-mantled racket-tail, and hornbills, although these large-billed birds are uncommon.

There are a number of mammals in the reserve although these face hunting pressure, with traps being set, mostly for small mammals. The Celebes crested macaque is found in the reserve and the spectral tarsier is also present but both of these are very wary of humans. Rare mammals include the anoa, the Celebes warty pig, the Sulawesi bear cuscus and the Sulawesi dwarf cuscus, and there are plenty of forest rats which emerge into the open at night.
