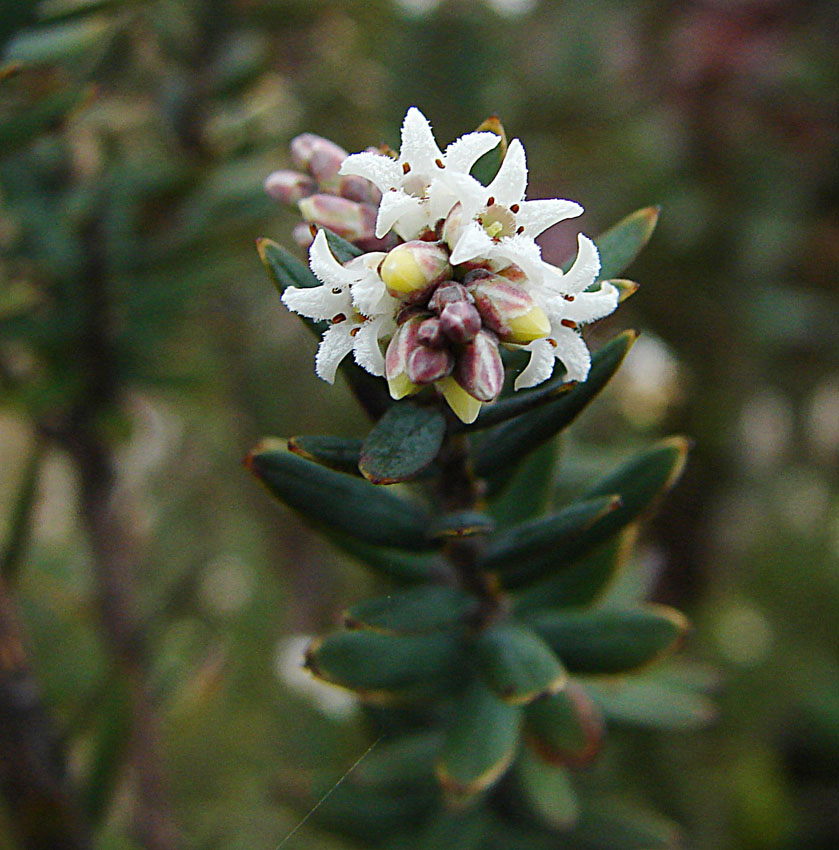
- Acrothamnus sauveolens found at the tree line of Mount Kinabalu, Borneo

Scientific classification
- Kingdom: Plantae
- Clade: Tracheophytes
- Clade: Angiosperms
- Clade: Eudicots
- Clade: Asterids
- Order: Ericales
- Family: Ericaceae
- Subfamily: Epacridoideae
- Tribe: Styphelieae
- Genus: Acrothamnus; Quinn

= Acrothamnus =

Genus of flowering plants

Acrothamnus is a genus of flowering plants in the family Ericaceae. The species, which were formerly included in the genus Leucopogon, occur in eastern Australia, New Zealand, New Guinea and the Pacific. They include:

- Acrothamnus colensoi (Hook.f.) Quinn
- Acrothamnus hookeri (Sond.) Quinn
- Acrothamnus maccraei (F.Muell.) Quinn - Subalpine beard-heath
- Acrothamnus montanus (R.Br) Quinn - Snow beard-heath
- Acrothamnus spathaceus (Pedley) Quinn
- Acrothamnus suaveolens (Hook.f.) Quinn
