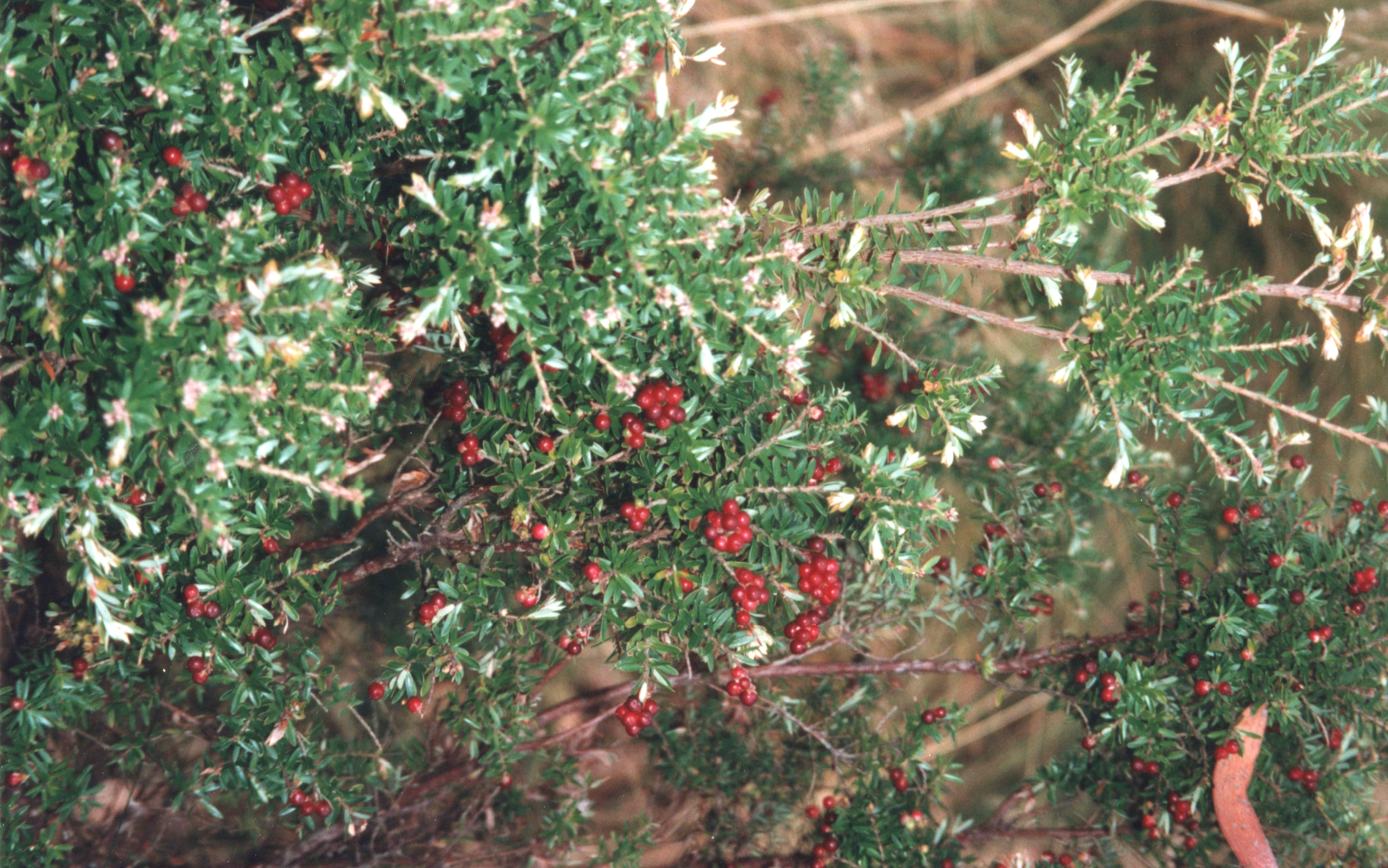
- Careys Peak, Australia

Scientific classification
- Kingdom: Plantae
- Clade: Tracheophytes
- Clade: Angiosperms
- Clade: Eudicots
- Clade: Asterids
- Order: Ericales
- Family: Ericaceae
- Genus: Acrothamnus
- Species: A. hookeri

Binomial name
- Acrothamnus hookeri (Sond.) Quinn

= Acrothamnus hookeri =

Mountain beardheath

Species of flowering plant

Acrothamnus hookeri, commonly known as the mountain beardheath, is a flowering plant in the family Ericaceae and grows in subalpine regions of southeastern Australia. It is a small upright shrub with oblong-shaped leaves and white flowers.

== Description ==
Acrothamnus hookeri is an upright, occasionally bushy shrub about 50 cm (20 in) high with branchlets that are rough. The leaves are oblong-shaped, 4.0–9.2 mm (0.16–0.36 in) long, 1.1–2.5 mm (0.043–0.098 in) wide, edges mostly smooth but finely toothed toward the apex, upper surface flat to curved outward, lower surface sometimes with a whitish covering and 3 middle more or less parallel veins, and a petiole 0.5–1.2 mm (0.020–0.047 in) long. The white flowers are borne in groups of 1–10 in spikes up to 4–10 mm (0.16–0.39 in) long, more or less crowded, at the end of branches or upper leaf nodes, bracteoles broadly oval-shaped, 1.2–1.7 mm (0.047–0.067 in) long and the sepals 1.75–2.6 mm (0.069–0.102 in) long. The male corolla tube is 2–2.1 mm (0.079–0.083 in) long, female tubes 1.8–1.9 mm (0.071–0.075 in) long, lobes about 1.5 mm (0.059 in) long and bearded on the inside. Flowering occurs from October to January and the fruit is a fleshy, pink drupe, red when ripe, smooth and 2.2–2.6 mm (0.087–0.102 in) long.

== Taxonomy ==
Acrothamnus hookeri was first formally described in 2005 by Christopher John Quinn and the description was published in Australian Systematic Botany.

== Distribution and habitat ==
Mountain beardheath grows in montane forest, in heath on wet rocky soils and woodland in New South Wales, Australian Capital Territory and Victoria.
