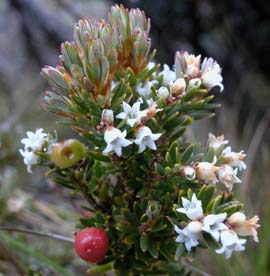
- Acrothamus montanus with fruit

Scientific classification
- Kingdom: Plantae
- Clade: Tracheophytes
- Clade: Angiosperms
- Clade: Eudicots
- Clade: Asterids
- Order: Ericales
- Family: Ericaceae
- Genus: Acrothamnus
- Species: A. montanus

Binomial name
- Acrothamnus montanus (R.Br.) Quinn

Synonyms
- Leucopogon montanus (R.Br.) J.H.Willis; Lissanthe montana R.Br.; Styphelia montana (R.Br.) F.Muell.

= Acrothamnus montanus =

Species of flowering plant

Acrothamnus montanus, also known as snow beard heath, is a native Australian bushy shrub commonly found in sub-alpine to alpine areas of southeast Australia.

Acrothamnus montanus has been previously known as Leucopogon montanus, Lissanthe montana and Styphelia montana.

== Description ==
Acrothamnus montanus is a woody perennial shrub growing up to 50 centimetres (20 in) high.

It is a hermaphrodite plant, reaching reproductive maturity around 5 years, and usually flowers between the months of December to March depending on the location.

Flower petals are white and glabrous, with a few papillae on the inner face. Flower occur in ~3-8 clustered spiked up to 7 millimetres (0.28 in) long. Flowers produce drupe, fleshy fruit that turns red when ripe.

Leaves are simple, oblong, narrow and blunt, with toothed margins; 4.5–7.8 millimetres (0.18–0.31 in) long and 1.2–2.3 millimetres (0.05–0.09 in) wide. Lamina is glabrous with flat or slightly concaved upper surface and glabrous lower surface with 3 central and parallel veins. Petiol is ~0.5–1.3 millimetres (0.02–0.05 in) long.

A. montanus stores buds (bud bank) in its basal and stem.

Easily confused with Acrothamnus hookeri, Acrothamnus montanus is thought to be a clinal form of this species. However, A. montanus can be distinguished by an absence of hairs within the flower, and slightly concaved leaves toward the apex.

== Taxonomy ==
The Greek translation of Acrothamnus montanus relates to the high altitude this shrub occurs in. Acron means 'summit or extremity', thamnos means 'shrub', and montanus means 'mountains'.

== Distribution ==
Acrothamnus montanus is distributed in sub-alpine and alpine areas across the Australian states of New South Wales, Victoria, and Tasmania.

Victorian legislation lists A. montanus as Endangered (EN) in the Flora and Fauna Guarantee Act 1988 (FFG). In Victoria, the species has been found in the East Gippsland Uplands, Highlands Northern Fall, Monaro Tablelands and the Victorian Alps.

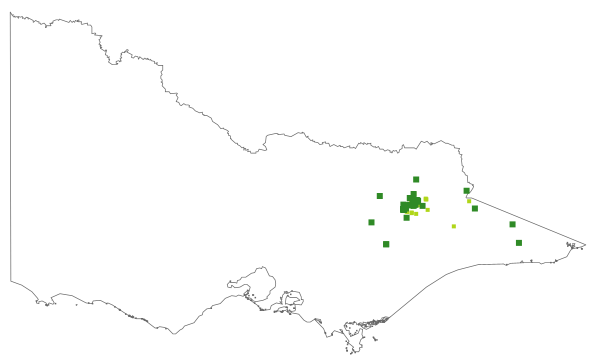
Distribution of A. montanus in Victoria, Australia

In NSW, the species has been found in areas around Mount Stilwell and Mount Kosciuszko.

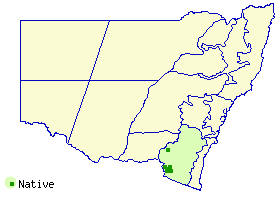
Distribution of A. montanus in NSW, Australia

=== Threats ===
A study about the impacts of global warming on alpine vegetation noted that Acrothamnus montanus shows high uncertainty for future landscape cover estimates. Predictions revealed an equally likely chance of the species increasing, decreasing or showing no change in landscape cover by 2050.

== Ecology ==
=== Guthega skink ===
Liopholis guthega is a nationally endangered skink, restricted to the alpine plateaus of Kosciuszko National Park (New South Wales) and Bogong High Plains (Victoria). Research observing L.guthega's foraging behaviours during summer found in late summer the skink's diet shifts from predominantly invertebrates to predominantly plant material, largely that of Acrothamnus montanus berries. This is thought to be in response to temporal variation impacting resource availability.

L. guthega is thought to play a significant role in seed dispersal of A. montanus, indicated by the prevalence of intact seeds in scat.

=== Mountain pygmy-possum ===
Burramys parvus, or the Mountain Pygmy-possum, habituates in dense alpine rock across southern Victoria and Kosciuszko National Park (New South Wales). Research found the main plant species present in the possum's diet is Acrothamnus montanus and Podocarpus lawrencei.

== Gallery ==
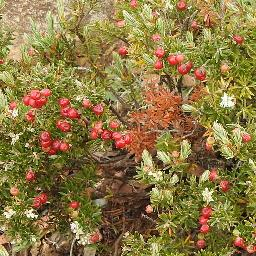
A. montanus with red berries

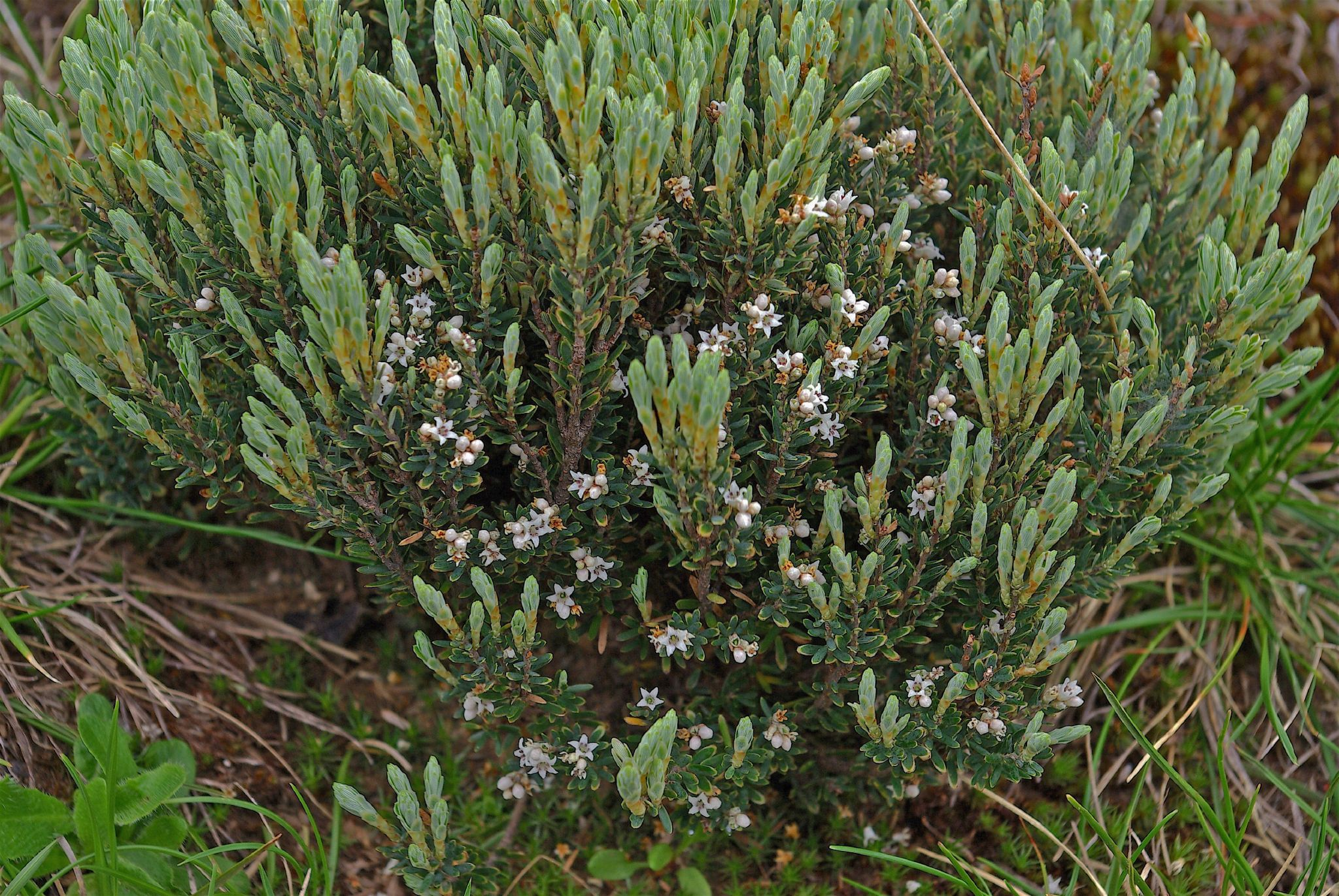
A. montanus

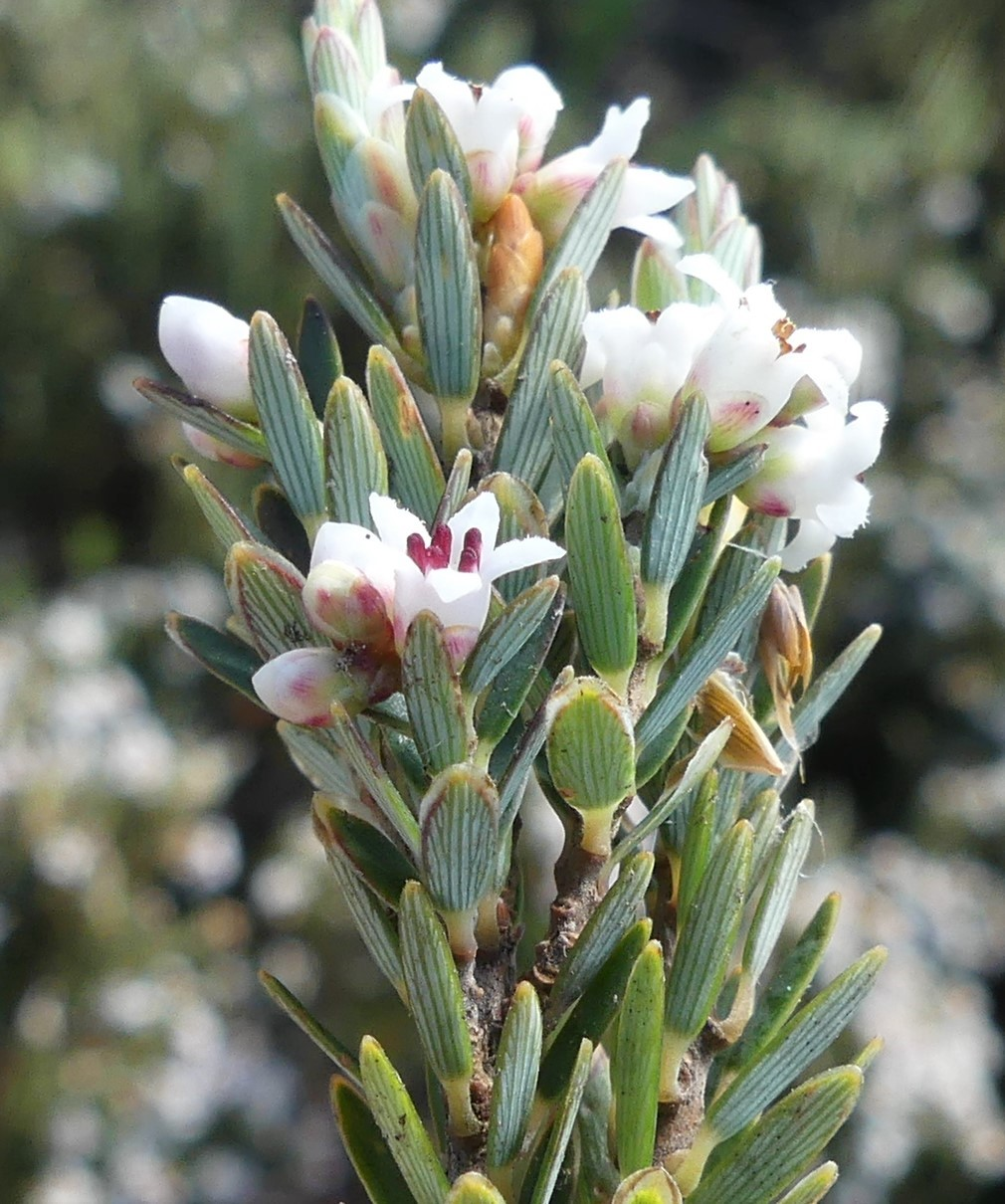
A. montanus at Falls Creek
