= Margaretamys =

Scientific classification
- Kingdom: Animalia
- Phylum: Chordata
- Class: Mammalia
- Infraclass: Placentalia
- Order: Rodentia
- Family: Muridae
- Subfamily: Murinae
- Tribe: Rattini
- Genus: Margaretamys; Musser, 1981

Type species
- Mus beccarii

Species
- Margaretamys beccarii Margaretamys christinae Margaretamys elegans Margaretamys parvus

Genus of rodents

Margaretamys is a genus of rodent in the family Muridae endemic to the island of Sulawesi in Indonesia. Up until 1973, it was known from only few examples of one species. Then Guy G. Musser collected more examples of this species during his stay in Sulawesi, as well as collecting two new species. And in 1981, as part of his huge project of sorting through the then very large genus Rattus, he described these as members of the new genus, Margaretamys.

The known distribution is the island of Sulawesi in Indonesia. Samples are known from the northern peninsula, the central core and the southeastern peninsula, ranging from tropical lowlands to mountain ranges up to about 2250 m. Each species is represented by only few examples, and have proven difficult to catch, so each species may have wider distributions and more species may exist in areas not yet surveyed.

It contains the following species:

- Beccari's margareta rat (Margaretamys beccarii)
- Christine's margareta rat (Margaretamys christinae)
- Elegant margareta rat (Margaretamys elegans)
- Little margareta rat (Margaretamys parvus)
