= Tanggeasinua Mountains =

Mountain range in Indonesia

Coordinates: 03°24′S 121°42′E

The Tanggeasinua Mountains (Pegunungan Tanggeasinua) are a range of mountains on the island of Sulawesi (the Celebes), in Indonesia. Running northwest–southeast, they form part of the spine of the southeast peninsula of the island. They are parallel to and east of the Mekongga Range and lie in the province of Southeast Sulawesi.
