= Sulawesi forest rat =

Conservation status
- Data Deficient (IUCN 3.1)

Scientific classification
- Kingdom: Animalia
- Phylum: Chordata
- Class: Mammalia
- Order: Rodentia
- Family: Muridae
- Genus: Taeromys
- Species: T. punicans

Binomial name
- Taeromys punicans (Miller & Hollister, 1921)
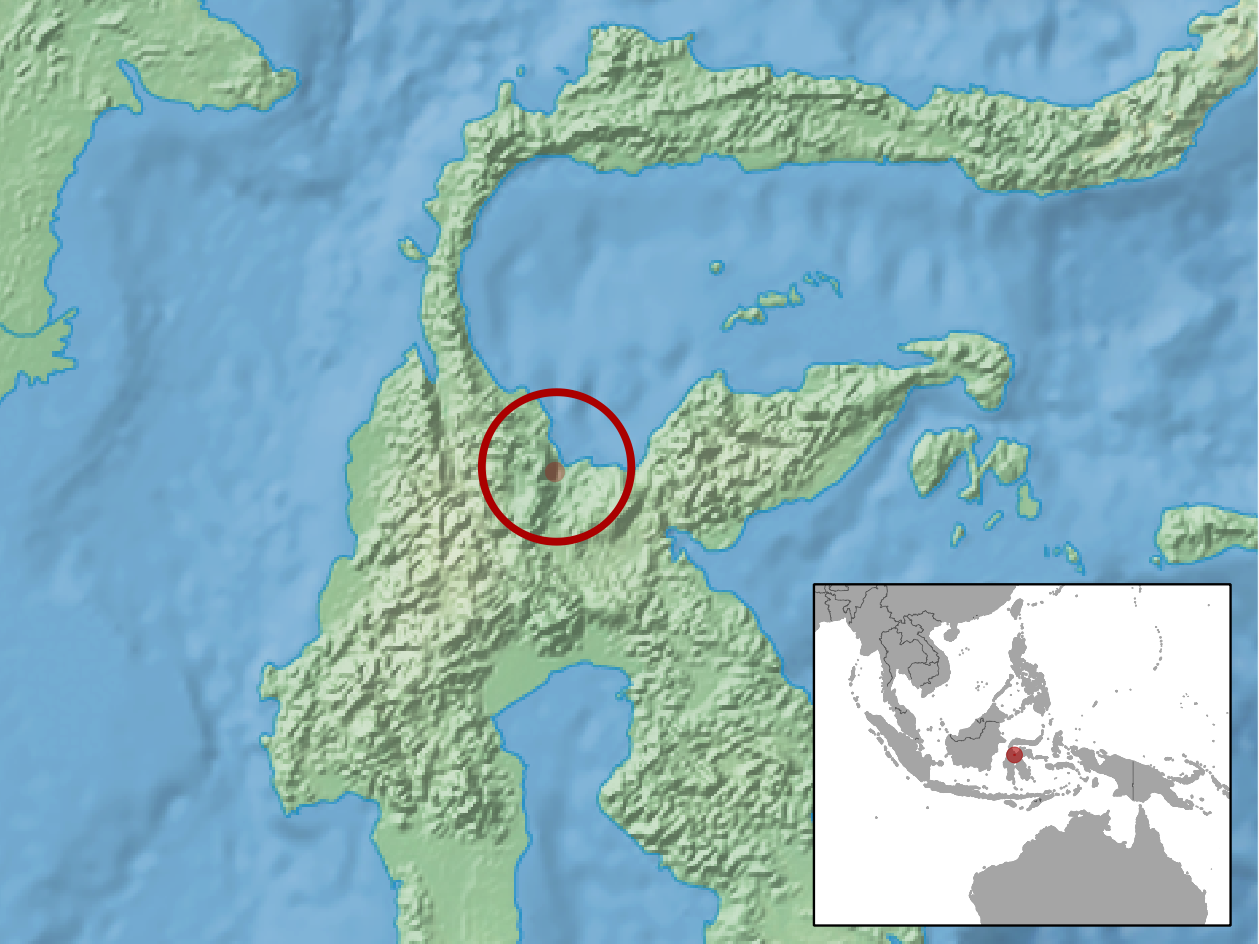

Species of rodent

The Sulawesi forest rat (Taeromys punicans) is a species of rodent in the family Muridae. It is found only in central Sulawesi, Indonesia. It is known only from Pinedapa, Poso Pesisir, Poso Regency.
