= Acrothamnus maccraei =

Scientific classification
- Kingdom: Plantae
- Clade: Tracheophytes
- Clade: Angiosperms
- Clade: Eudicots
- Clade: Asterids
- Order: Ericales
- Family: Ericaceae
- Genus: Acrothamnus
- Species: A. maccraei

Binomial name
- Acrothamnus maccraei (F.Muell.) Quinn

Synonyms
- Leucopogon maccraei F.Muell.

Species of flowering plant

Acrothamnus maccraei is commonly known as subalpine beard-heath. Its size ranges from 1 to 3 metres (3 ft 3 in to 9 ft 10 in) and it has white flowers. They are mainly dense like shrubs, with dark green spreading triangle like leaves.
