= Celebes rat =

Conservation status
- Least Concern (IUCN 3.1)

Scientific classification
- Kingdom: Animalia
- Phylum: Chordata
- Class: Mammalia
- Order: Rodentia
- Family: Muridae
- Genus: Taeromys
- Species: T. celebensis

Binomial name
- Taeromys celebensis (Gray, 1867)
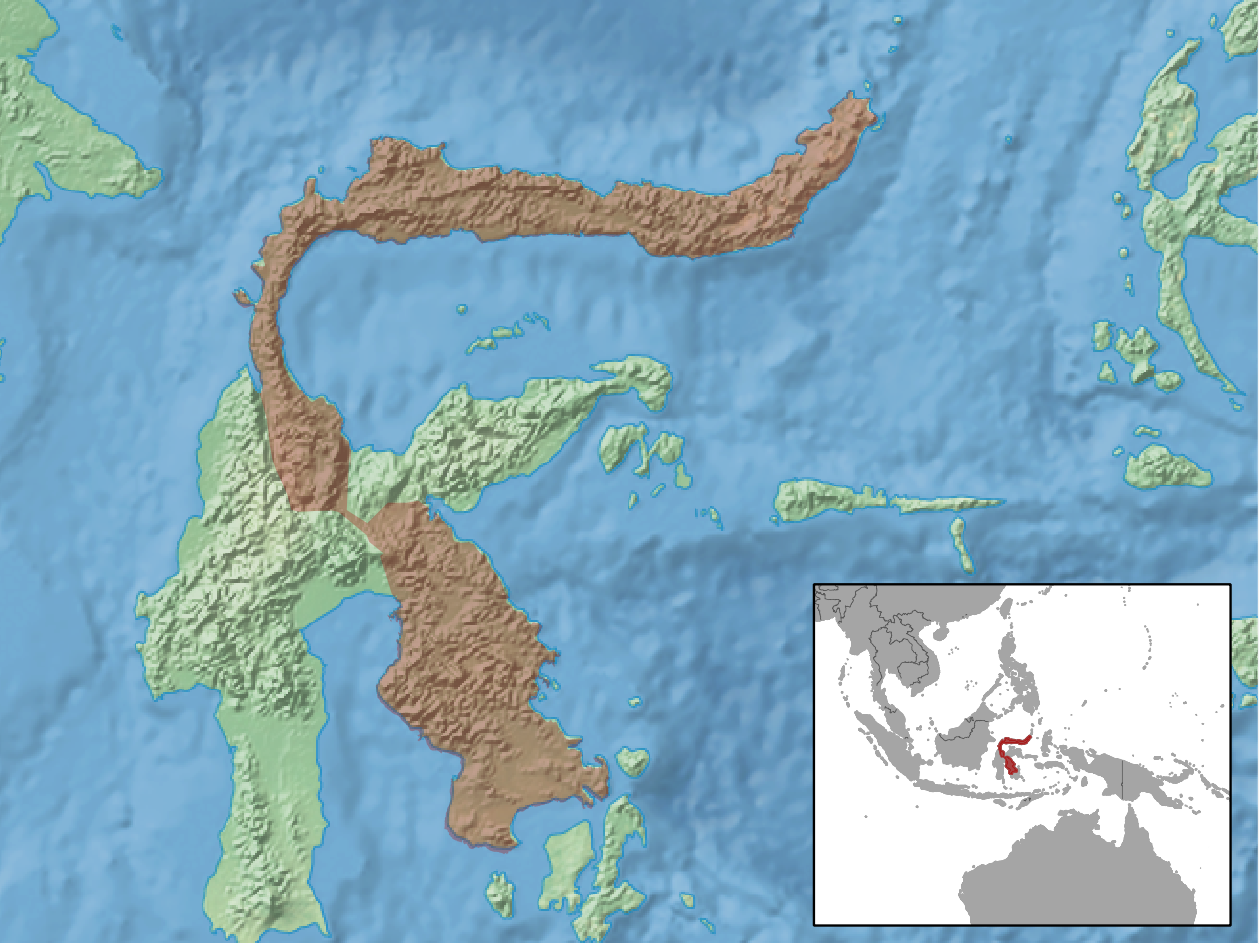

Species of rodent

The Celebes rat (Taeromys celebensis) is a species of rodent in the family Muridae. It is found only in Sulawesi, Indonesia.
