= Salokko rat =

Conservation status
- Vulnerable (IUCN 3.1)

Scientific classification
- Kingdom: Animalia
- Phylum: Chordata
- Class: Mammalia
- Order: Rodentia
- Family: Muridae
- Genus: Taeromys
- Species: T. arcuatus

Binomial name
- Taeromys arcuatus (Tate & Archbold, 1935)
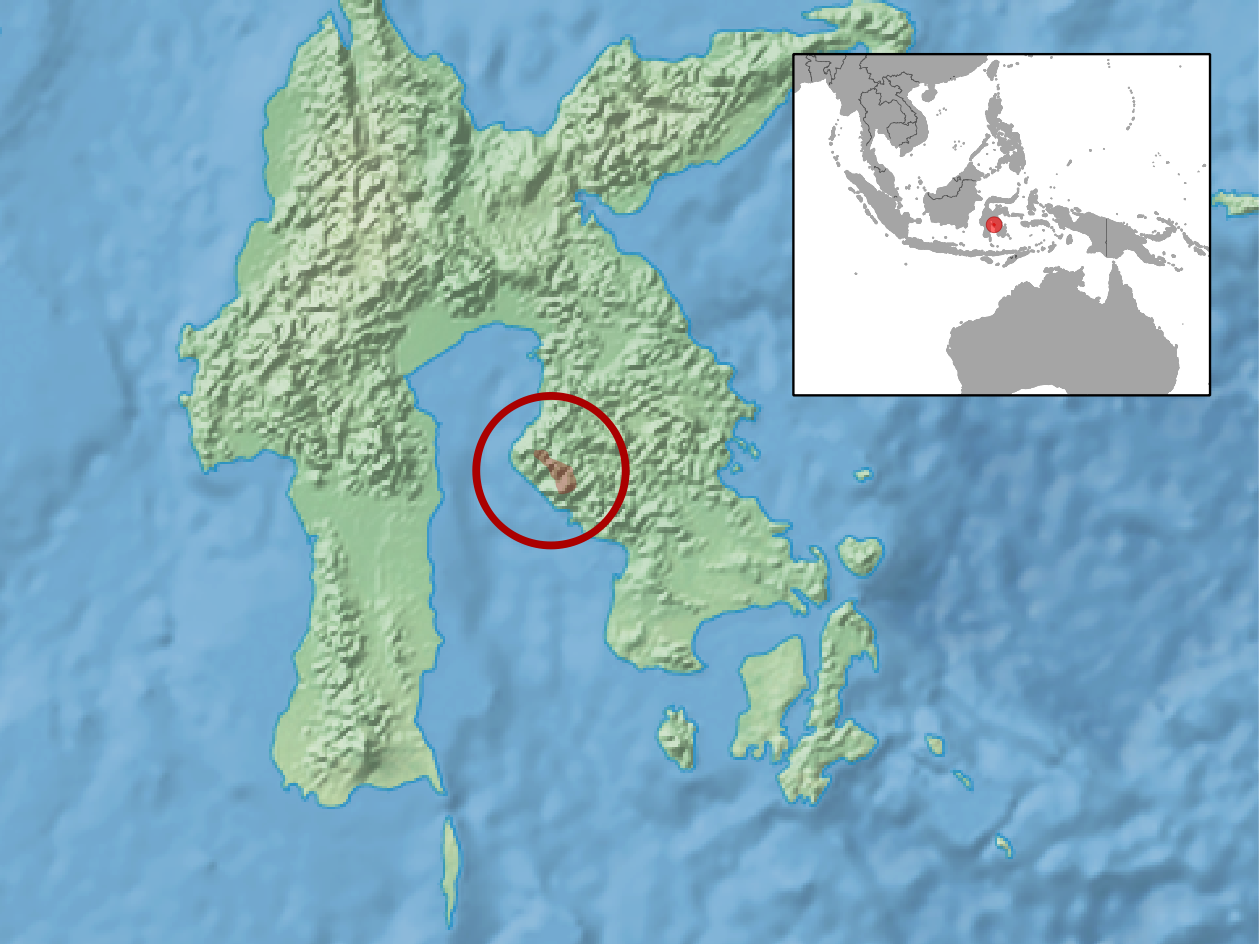

Species of rodent

The Salokko rat (Taeromys arcuatus) is a species of rodent in the family Muridae.

It is found only in Sulawesi, Indonesia. The Salokko rat has been found in the Mekongga Mountains of southeastern Sulawesi, and Lore Lindu National Park, Central Sulawesi.

== Bibliography ==
- Musser, G. G.; Carleton, M. D. (2005). "Superfamily Muroidea". In Wilson, D. E.; Reeder, D. M. (eds.). Mammal Species of the World: A Taxonomic and Geographic Reference (3rd ed.). Johns Hopkins University Press. pp. 894–1531. ISBN 978-0-8018-8221-0. OCLC 62265494.
