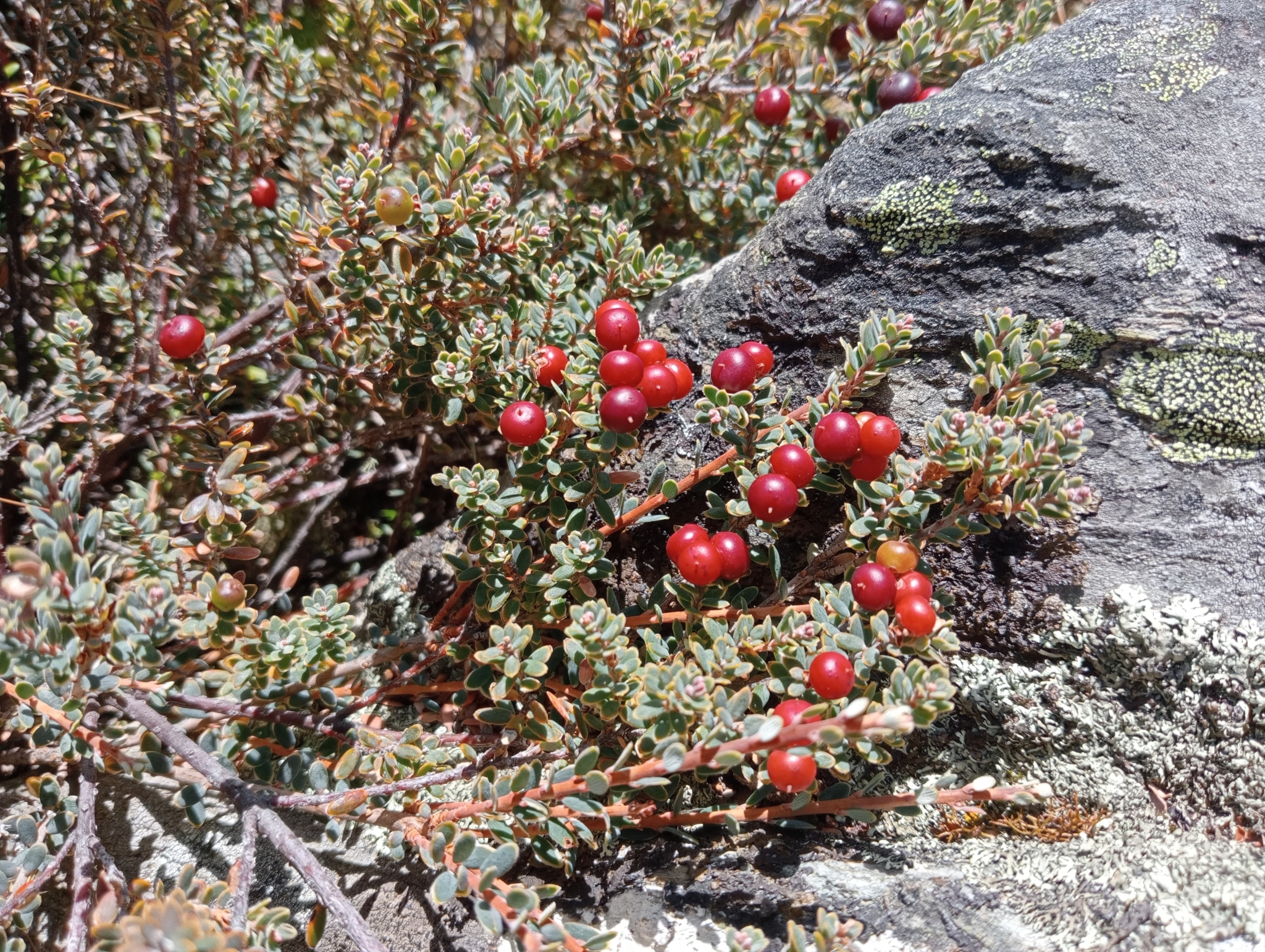

Conservation status
- Not Threatened (NZ TCS)

Scientific classification
- Kingdom: Plantae
- Clade: Tracheophytes
- Clade: Angiosperms
- Clade: Eudicots
- Clade: Asterids
- Order: Ericales
- Family: Ericaceae
- Genus: Acrothamnus
- Species: A. colensoi

Binomial name
- Acrothamnus colensoi (Hook.f.) Quinn

Synonyms
- Cyathodes colensoi (Hook.f.) Hook.f., 1864; Leucopogon colensoi Hook.f., 1864

= Acrothamnus colensoi =

Species of flowering plant

Acrothamnus colensoi, also known as Colenso's mingimingi or mountain heath, is a species of plant in the family Ericaceae endemic to New Zealand. It is a small shrub that grow to approximately 50 cm tall, and can spread to form mounds of up to 2 m across. Fruit are round and are white, pink or dark red in colour. It can be found in both the lower North and eastern South Islands, in scrubland, tussock grassland, and rocky fellfield.

== Taxonomy and nomenclature ==
A. colensoi was described in 1864 by Joseph Hooker as Cyathodes colensoi, and named after William Colenso, the New Zealand missionary, botanist and politician. It remained in Cyathodes for many years before being assigned to the genus Leucopogon, and then moved to Acrothamnus in 2005. It had been treated as A. suaveolens (a species now considered endemic to Borneo) but was separated by an examination of DNA and chromosome number.

== Description ==
The species is a low-growing or prostrate shrub that is sprawling and branched, usually 40 cm tall by 60 cm across but sometimes forming patches 2 m across. The leaves are sessile or subsessile and are pinkish green to red-brown. The branches are ascending to erect, weakly ribbed and a grey-brown colour. Its berries are 4–5 mm in diameter, globose, fleshy, and glossy; colours range between white, pink, red, and crimson to almost black. Their thin flesh conceals 5 hard seeds.

Its leaves are 5–10 by 1–4 mm, alternate and spreading with greenish veins and white interveinal grooves; they have 3–5 prominent parallel veins and can have a white stripe on the underside. Leaf margins are distinctively finely hairy when young, but mostly glabrous, and rolled downwards and inwards. The leaves are distinctively lozenge shaped: oblong, then narrowing to a fine point.

Its honey-scented flowers are white to yellowish, and produced in clusters of 2–5 at the tips of the branches. They are subtended by two keeled bracteoles and a bract which is up to 2.5 mm long and pinkish green to red in colour. This is glaucescent, broadly ovulate, obtuse and ciliolate. The bracteoles are very similar but smaller and distinctly keeled. The sepals are up to 4 mm long and imbricate with stomata only on the adaxial surface. The flowers are between 6–8 mm long, with a 4–5 mm long corolla tube, hairy in its upper part. Flowers have both male and female parts, but often function as only male or female; those that act as female can bear fruit.

A. colensoi's chromosome number is 2n = 146, distinctive and unlike anything seen in other members of the ericoid Styphelieae in New Zealand.

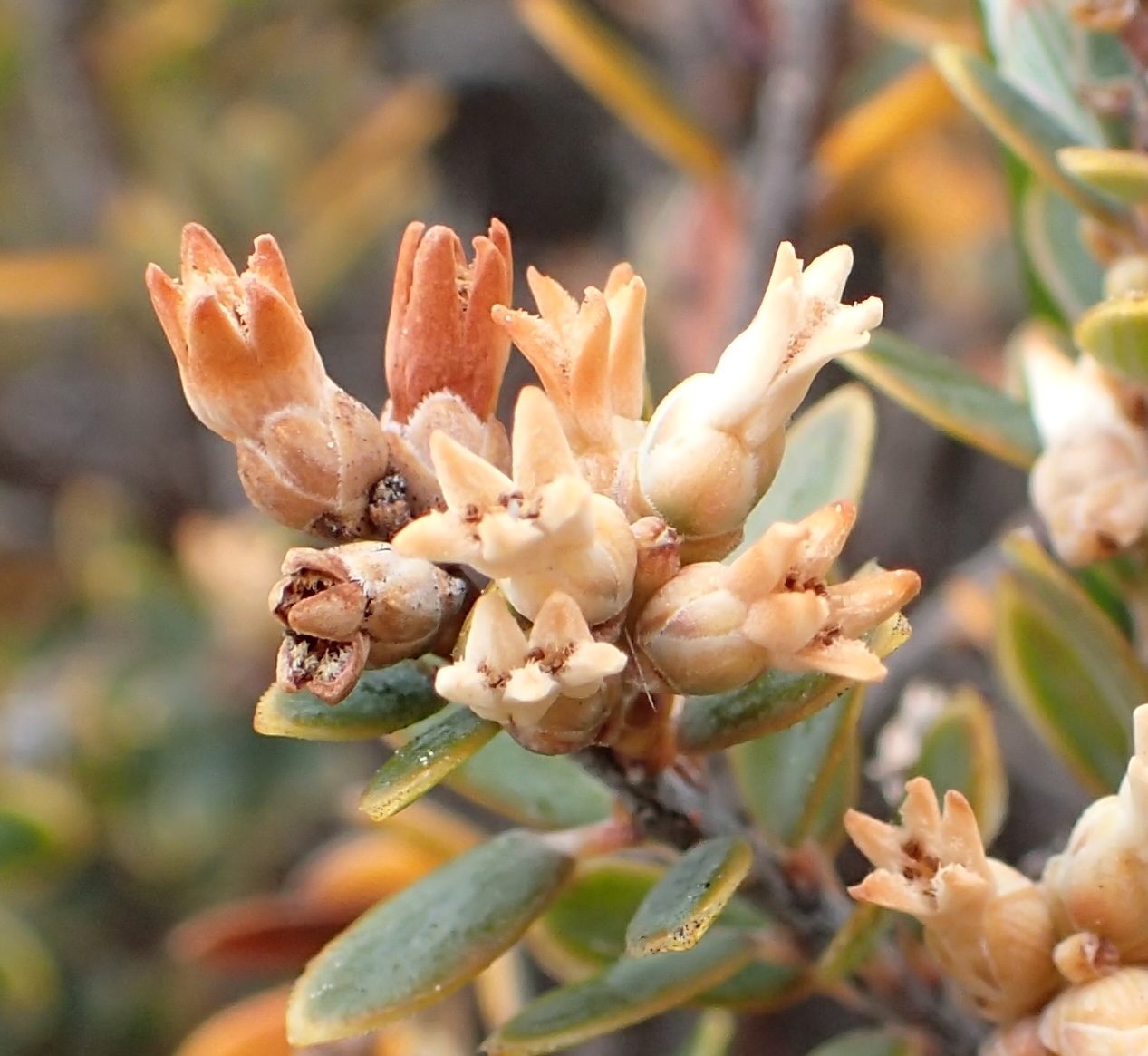
Flowers

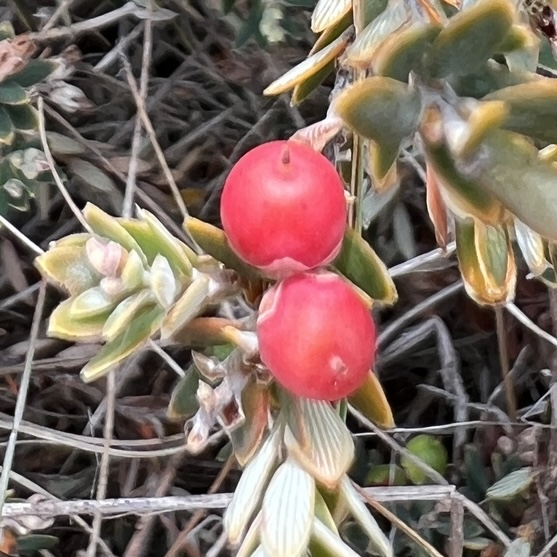
Fruit

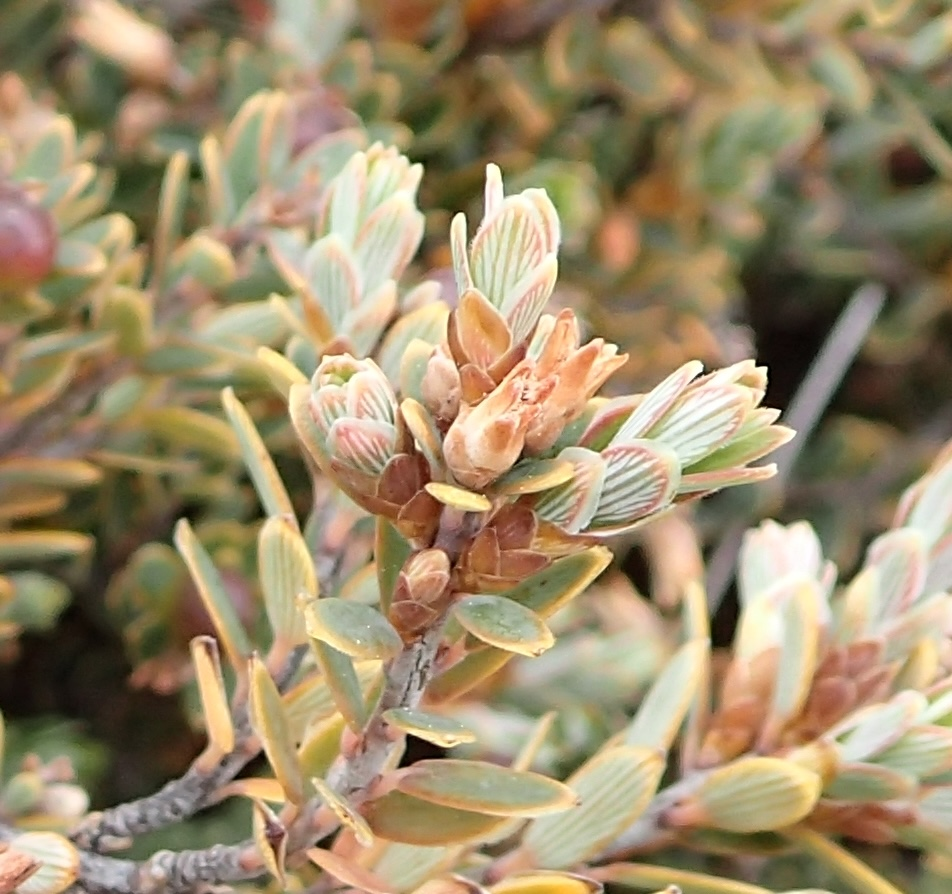
Leaves

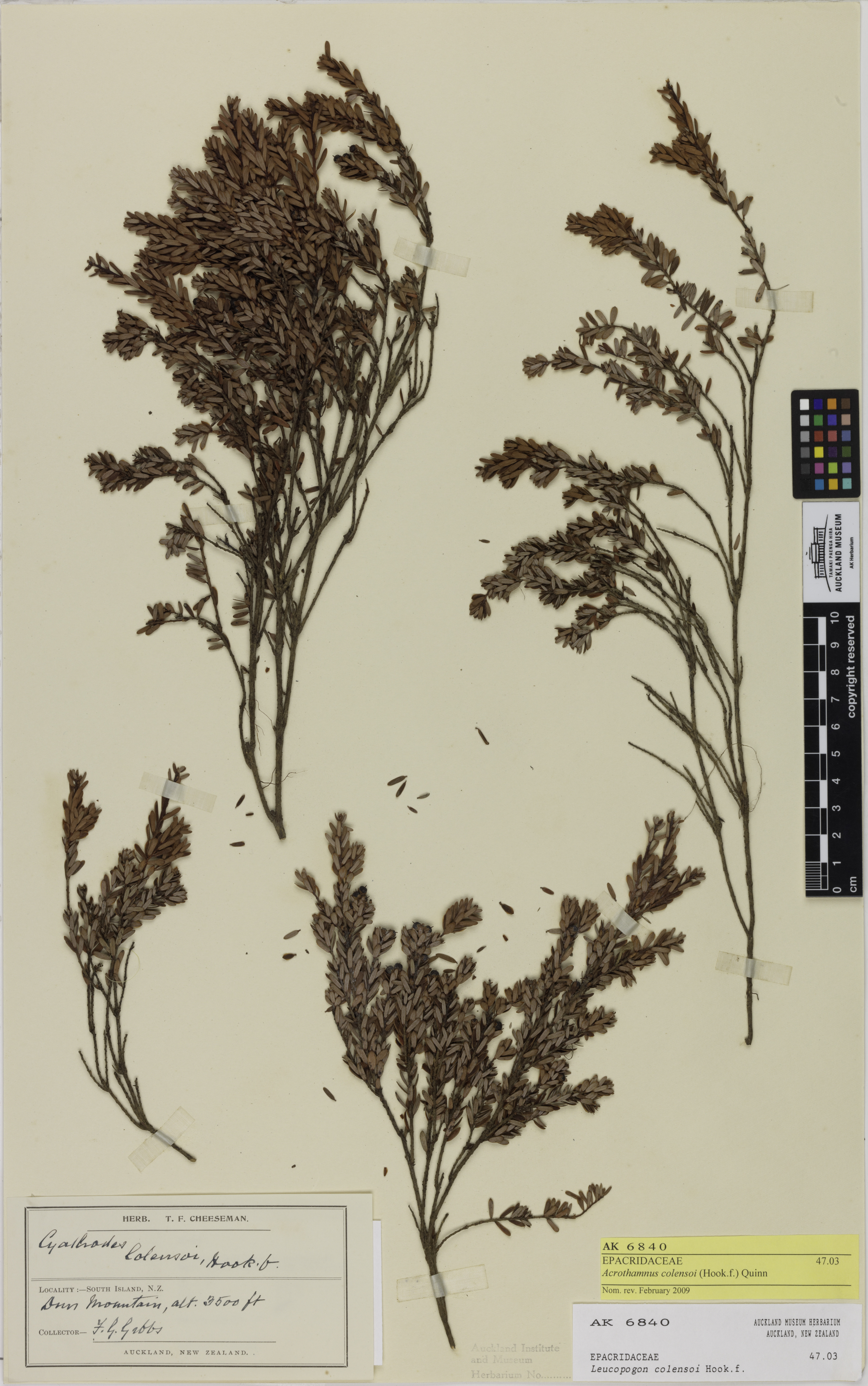
Type specimen from the Auckland War Memorial Museum herbarium

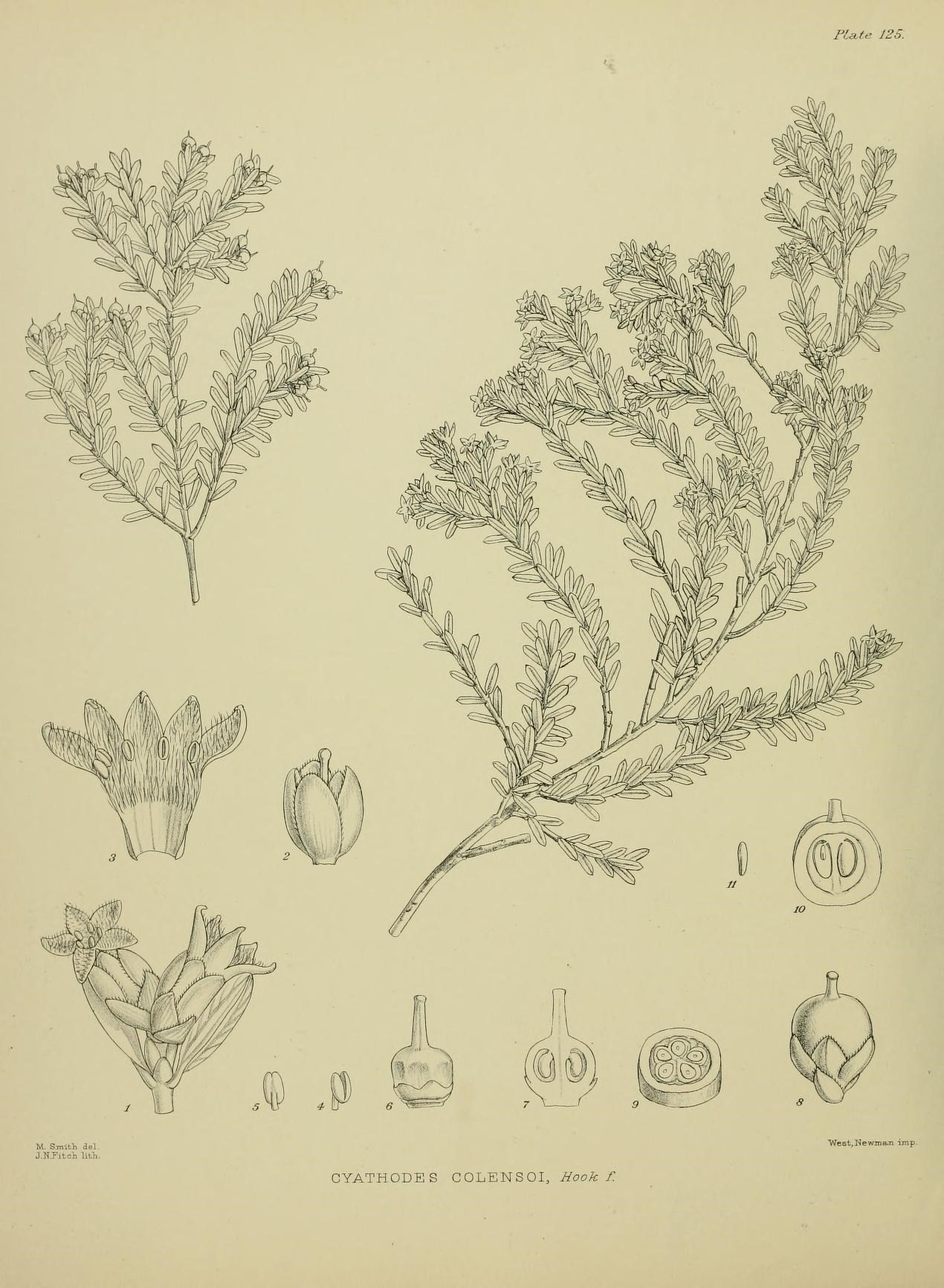
Illustration by Matilda Smith

== Distribution and habitat ==
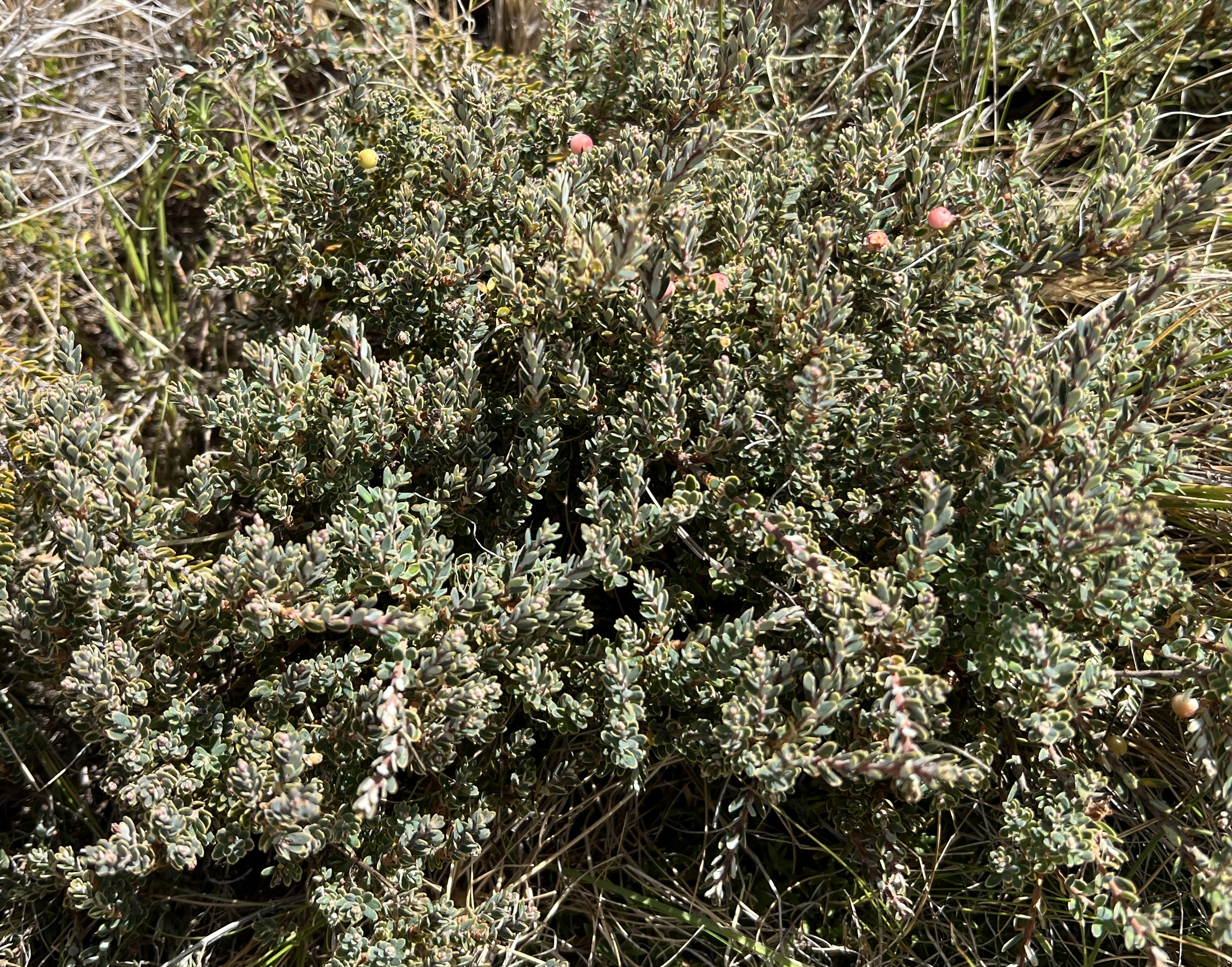
Small plant at Cass Field Station, Canterbury

A. colensoi is endemic to New Zealand. It is found in both main islands, from the central North Island to Otago. In the South Island it can be found in drier eastern mountains of Marlborough and Canterbury, locally in Otago and rarely in northern Southland. Its habitat is generally montane to low-alpine (600–1600 m), extending to lower altitudes in the southern part of its range. It prefers well-drained sites in shrubland, tussock grassland, and rocky outcrops.

== Ecology ==
This species flowers from September to February and begins fruiting in November, ending in June. The berries are fleshy and eaten by birds, reptiles and invertebrates (although hardly palatable to humans); the leaves and flowers are very rarely eaten.

== Conservation ==
A. colensoi is not a threatened species, but it is very difficult to propagate and should not be removed from the wild.
