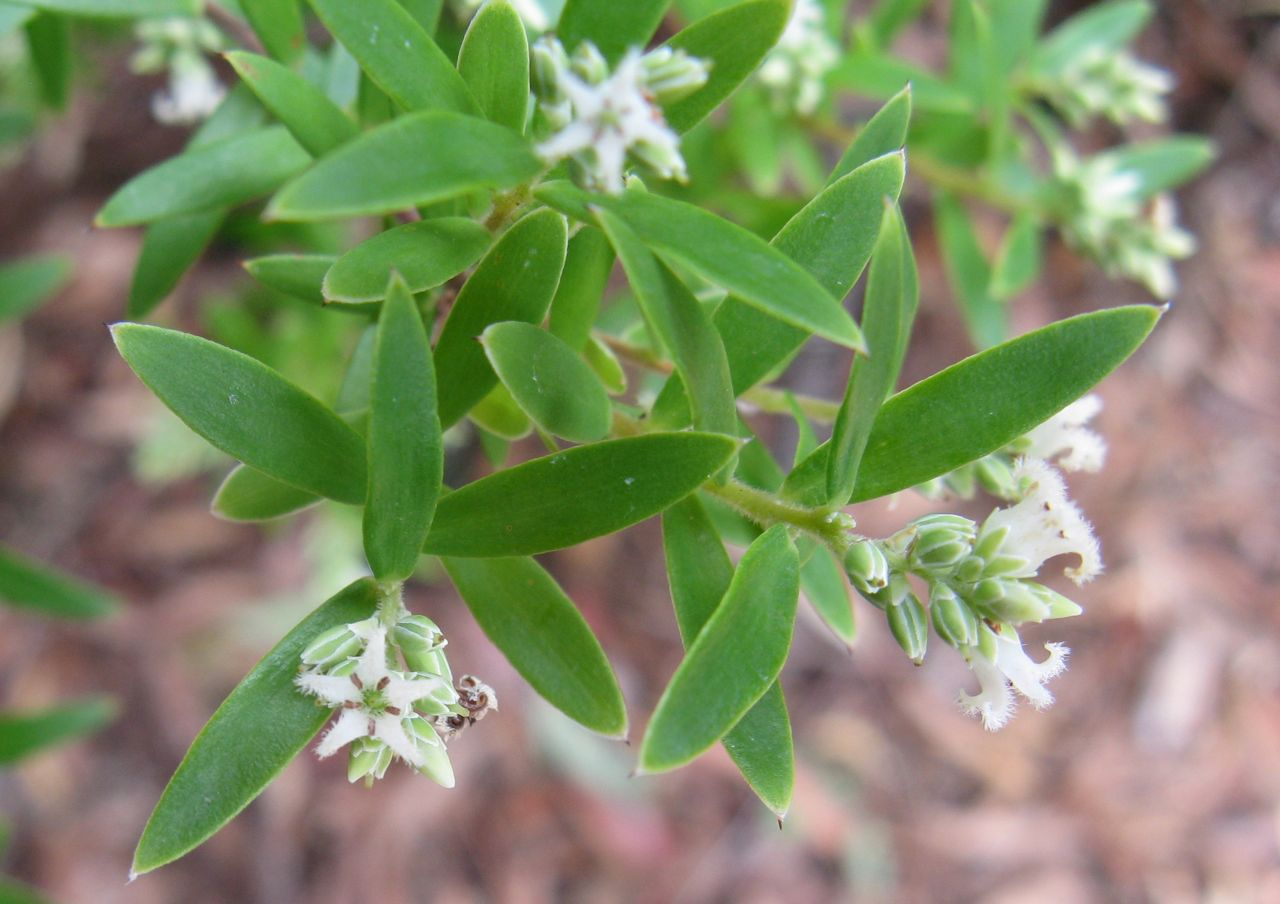

Scientific classification
- Kingdom: Plantae
- Clade: Tracheophytes
- Clade: Angiosperms
- Clade: Eudicots
- Clade: Asterids
- Order: Ericales
- Family: Ericaceae
- Genus: Acrothamnus
- Species: A. spathaceus

Binomial name
- Acrothamnus spathaceus (Pedley) Quinn

Synonyms
- Leucopogon spathaceus

= Acrothamnus spathaceus =

Species of flowering plant

Acrothamnus spathaceus, also known as the mountain beard-heath, is a shrub or small tree up to 6 metres (20 ft) high. Known from two populations. One in tropical Queensland. Also known in the McPherson Range on the border with New South Wales, as far south as Numinbah Nature Reserve. The habitat is montane rainforests and their margins.
