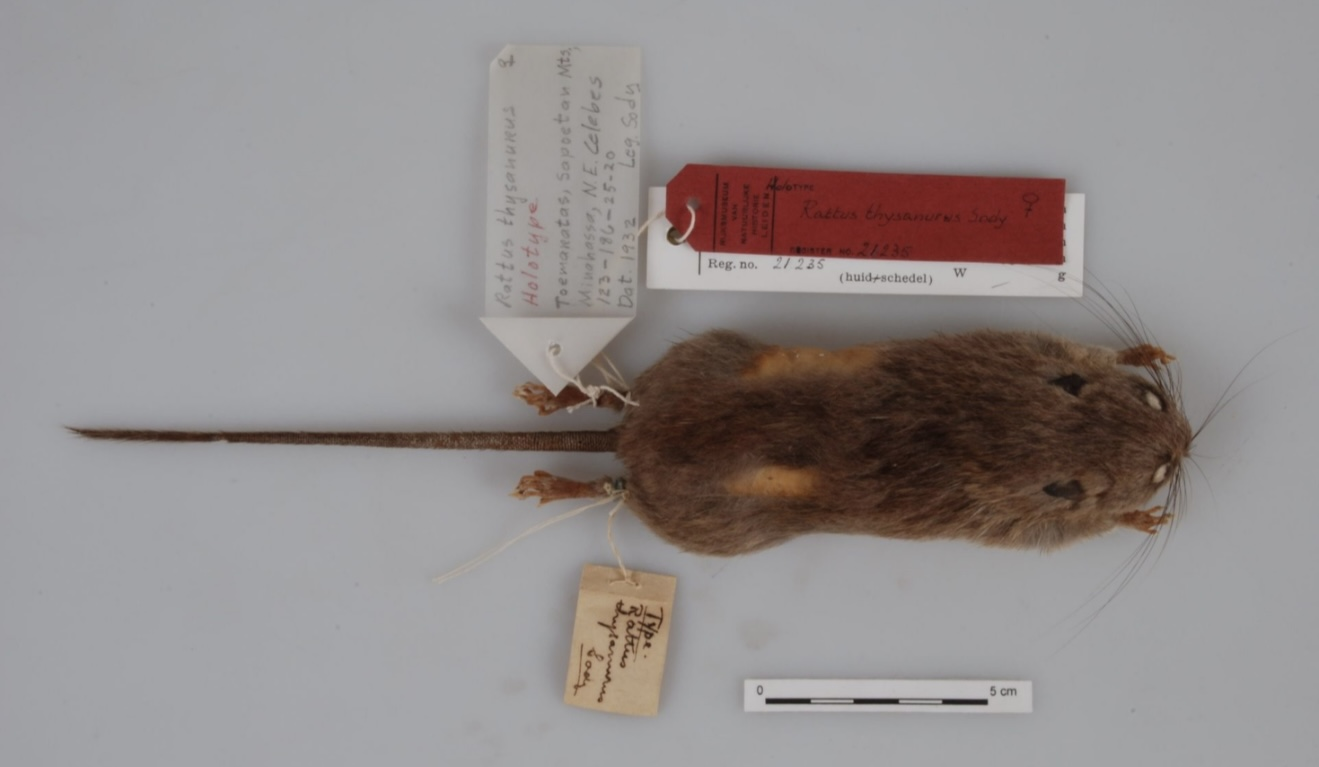
- Margaretamys beccarii

Conservation status
- Least Concern (IUCN 3.1)

Scientific classification
- Kingdom: Animalia
- Phylum: Chordata
- Class: Mammalia
- Order: Rodentia
- Family: Muridae
- Genus: Margaretamys
- Species: M. beccarii

Binomial name
- Margaretamys beccarii (Jentink, 1880)

= Beccari's margareta rat =

Beccari's Margareta rat

Species of rodent

Beccari's margareta rat (Margaretamys beccarii) is a species of rodent in the family Muridae. It is endemic to the island of Sulawesi in Indonesia.
