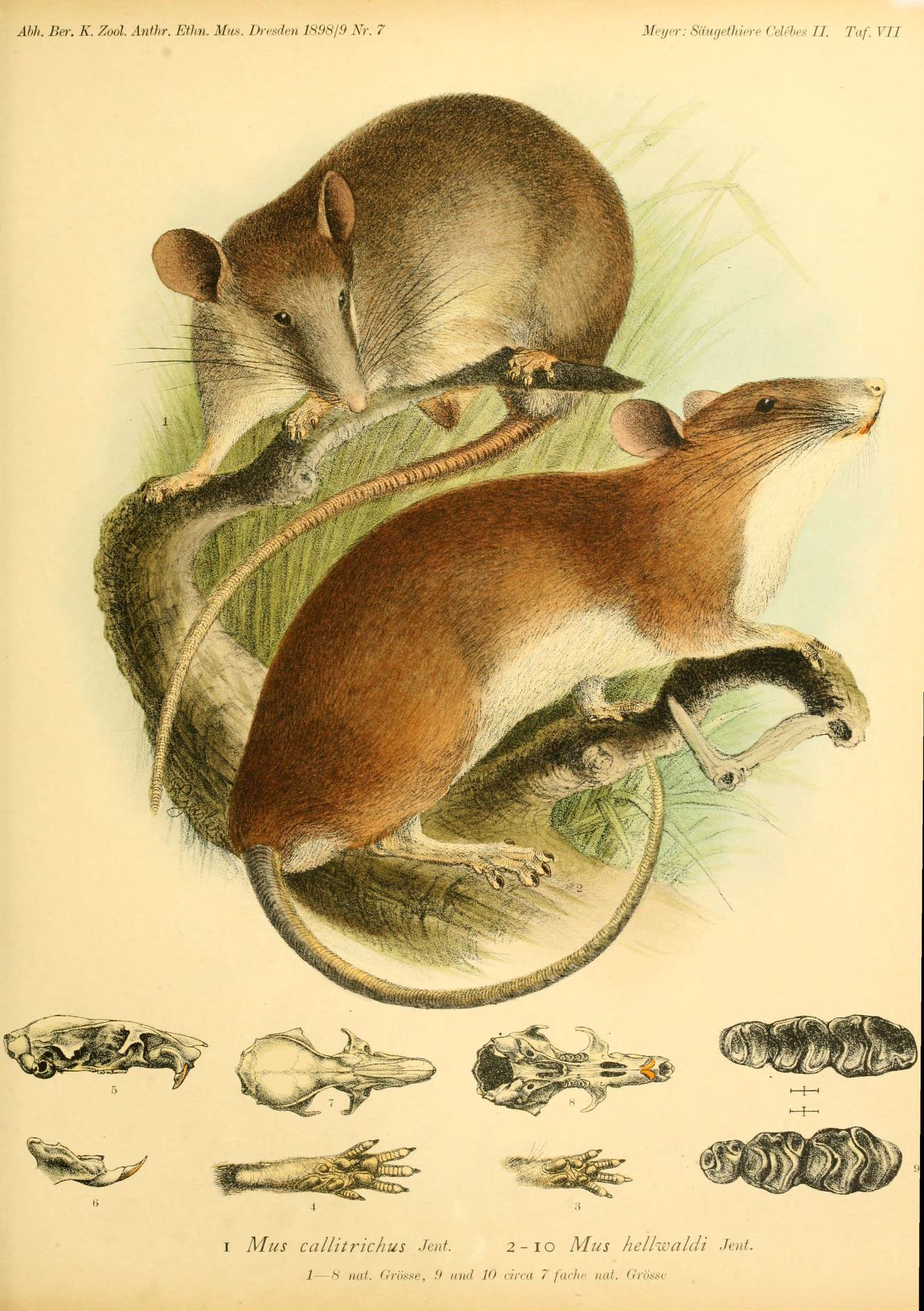
- Taeromys callitrichus (upper animal)

Scientific classification
- Domain: Eukaryota
- Kingdom: Animalia
- Phylum: Chordata
- Class: Mammalia
- Order: Rodentia
- Family: Muridae
- Subfamily: Murinae
- Tribe: Rattini
- Genus: Taeromys; Sody, 1941

Type species
- Mus (Gymnomys) celebensis

Species
- Taeromys arcuatus Taeromys callitrichus Taeromys celebensis Taeromys hamatus Taeromys microbullatus Taeromys punicans Taeromys taerae

= Taeromys =

Genus of rodents

Taeromys is a genus of rodent in the family Muridae found exclusively in Sulawesi, Indonesia. It contains the following species:

- Salokko rat (Taeromys arcuatus)
- Lovely-haired rat (Taeromys callitrichus)
- Celebes rat (Taeromys celebensis)
- Sulawesi montane rat (Taeromys hamatus)
- Small-eared rat (Taeromys microbullatus)
- Sulawesi forest rat (Taeromys punicans)
- Tondano rat (Taeromys taerae)
