= Lithocarpus bancanus =

Conservation status
- Least Concern (IUCN 3.1)

Scientific classification
- Kingdom: Plantae
- Clade: Tracheophytes
- Clade: Angiosperms
- Clade: Eudicots
- Clade: Rosids
- Order: Fagales
- Family: Fagaceae
- Genus: Lithocarpus
- Species: L. bancanus

Binomial name
- Lithocarpus bancanus (Scheff.) Rehder

Synonyms
- Lithocarpus rajah (Hance) A.Camus; Pasania bancana (Scheff.) Markgr.; Pasania rajah (Hance) S.Moore; Quercus bancana Scheff.; Quercus rajah Hance; Synaedrys bancana (Scheff.) Koidz.; Synaedrys rajah (Hance) Koidz.

Species of tree

Lithocarpus bancanus is a tree in the beech family Fagaceae. The specific epithet bancanus is from the Latin, meaning "of Bangka" (an island east of Sumatra).

== Description ==
Lithocarpus bancanus grows as a tree up to 25 metres (80 ft) tall with a trunk diameter of up to 50 cm (20 in). The yellowish to greyish brown bark is smooth to scaly. The leaves measure up to 14 cm (6 in) long. Its brownish acorns are ovoid to roundish and measure up to 2 cm (0.8 in) long.

== Distribution and habitat ==
Lithocarpus bancanus grows naturally in Thailand, Borneo, Peninsular Malaysia and Sumatra. Its habitat is hill dipterocarp and sometimes peat swamp forests up to 900 m (3,000 ft) elevation.
