= Keysseria =

Scientific classification
- Kingdom: Plantae
- Clade: Tracheophytes
- Clade: Angiosperms
- Clade: Eudicots
- Clade: Asterids
- Order: Asterales
- Family: Asteraceae
- Subfamily: Asteroideae
- Tribe: Astereae
- Subtribe: Lagenophorinae
- Genus: Keysseria; Lauterb.

Type species
- Keysseria papuana Lauterb. (1914)

Species
- 11; see text

Synonyms
- Hecatactis F.Muell. ex Mattf. (1929), nom. superfl.

Genus of flowering plants

Keysseria (island-daisy) is a genus of flowering plants in the family Asteraceae. It includes 11 species, all of which are native to New Guinea with one species (Keysseria gibbisae) also native to northern Borneo.

== Species ==
11 species are accepted.

- Keysseria bellidiformis (F.Muell.) Mattf. – montane New Guinea
- Keysseria extensa J.Kost. – montane New Guinea
- Keysseria fasciculata J.Kost. – montane New Guinea
- Keysseria gibbsiae (Merr.) Cabrera ex Steenis – northern Borneo and New Guinea
- Keysseria papuana Lauterb. – montane New Guinea
- Keysseria pinguiculiformis J.Kost. – montane New Guinea
- Keysseria radicans (F.Muell.) Mattf. – montane New Guinea
- Keysseria rosulans J.Kost. – montane New Guinea
- Keysseria tomentella Mattf. – montane New Guinea
- Keysseria trachyphylla (Mattf.) Mattf. – New Guinea
- Keysseria wollastonii (S.Moore) Mattf. – montane New Guinea

=== Formerly placed here ===
- Helodeaster erici (C.N.Forbes) G.L.Nesom (as Keysseria erici (C.N.Forbes) Cabrera)
- Helodeaster helenae (C.N.Forbes & Lydgate) G.L.Nesom as (Keysseria helenae (C.N.Forbes & Lydgate) Cabrera)
- Helodeaster maviensis (H.Mann) G.L.Nesom (as Keysseria maviensis (H.Mann) Cabrera)
- Pytinicarpa pickeringii (A.Gray) G.L.Nesom (as Keysseria pickeringii (A.Gray) Cabrera)
