= Little margareta rat =

Conservation status
- Data Deficient (IUCN 3.1)

Scientific classification
- Kingdom: Animalia
- Phylum: Chordata
- Class: Mammalia
- Order: Rodentia
- Family: Muridae
- Genus: Margaretamys
- Species: M. parvus

Binomial name
- Margaretamys parvus Musser, 1981

Species of rodent

The little margareta rat (Margaretamys parvus) is a species of rodent in the family Muridae. It is endemic to the island of Sulawesi in Indonesia.
