= Lithocarpus celebicus =

Conservation status
- Least Concern (IUCN 3.1)

Scientific classification
- Kingdom: Plantae
- Clade: Tracheophytes
- Clade: Angiosperms
- Clade: Eudicots
- Clade: Rosids
- Order: Fagales
- Family: Fagaceae
- Genus: Lithocarpus
- Species: L. celebicus

Binomial name
- Lithocarpus celebicus (Miq.) Rehder (1919)

Synonyms
- Synonymy: Cyclobalanus celebica (Miq.) Oerst. (1866); Cyclobalanus concentrica Oerst. (1866); Cyclobalanus llanosii (A.DC.) Oerst. (1866); Lithocarpus aculeatus (Markgr.) Rehder (1929); Lithocarpus brachycladus (Seemen) A.Camus (1944); Lithocarpus dalbertisii (F.Muell.) Rehder (1929); Lithocarpus lipacon (Elmer) Rehder (1919); Lithocarpus llanosii (A.DC.) Rehder (1919); Lithocarpus mabesae (Merr.) A.Camus (1946); Lithocarpus papuanus (Warb.) Rehder (1929); Pasania aculeata Markgr. (1924); Pasania companoana (Vidal) Markgr. (1924); Pasania dalbertisii (F.Muell.) Markgr. (1924); Pasania papuana (Warb.) Markgr. (1924); Quercus brachyclada Seemen (1904); Quercus celebica Miq. (1864) (basionym); Quercus companoana Vidal (1883); Quercus concentrica Blanco (1845), nom. illeg.; Quercus dalbertisii F.Muell. (Dec. 1884); Quercus gulliveri F.Muell. (1885); Quercus lipacon Elmer (1913); Quercus llanosii A.DC. (1864); Quercus mabesae Merr. (1918); Quercus pseudomolucca var. papuana Warb. (1891); Quercus sundaica Fern.-Vill. (1880), nom. illeg.; Synaedrys brachyclada (Seemen) Koidz. (1916); Synaedrys celebica (Miq.) Koidz. (1916); Synaedrys dalbertisii (F.Muell.) Koidz. (1916); Synaedrys gulliveri (F.Muell.) Koidz. (1916); Synaedrys llanosii (A.DC.) Koidz. (1916)

Species of flowering plant

Lithocarpus celebicus is a species of flowering plant in the beech family, Fagaceae. It is a tree native to the Philippines, Sulawesi, Maluku Islands, and New Guinea.

Lithocarpus celebicus is a predominant canopy tree in Sulawesi's mid-montane rain forests (1500–2000 meters elevation), together with Lithocarpus menadoensis and species of Myrtaceae and Agathis.

The species has a large population and across a wide range, and is assessed as least concern by the IUCN.
