= Lovely-haired rat =

- Stuffed specimen

Conservation status
- Data Deficient (IUCN 3.1)

Scientific classification
- Kingdom: Animalia
- Phylum: Chordata
- Class: Mammalia
- Order: Rodentia
- Family: Muridae
- Genus: Taeromys
- Species: T. callitrichus

Binomial name
- Taeromys callitrichus (Jentink, 1878)

Species of rodent

The lovely-haired rat (Taeromys callitrichus) is a species of rodent in the family Muridae. It is found only in Sulawesi, Indonesia.
