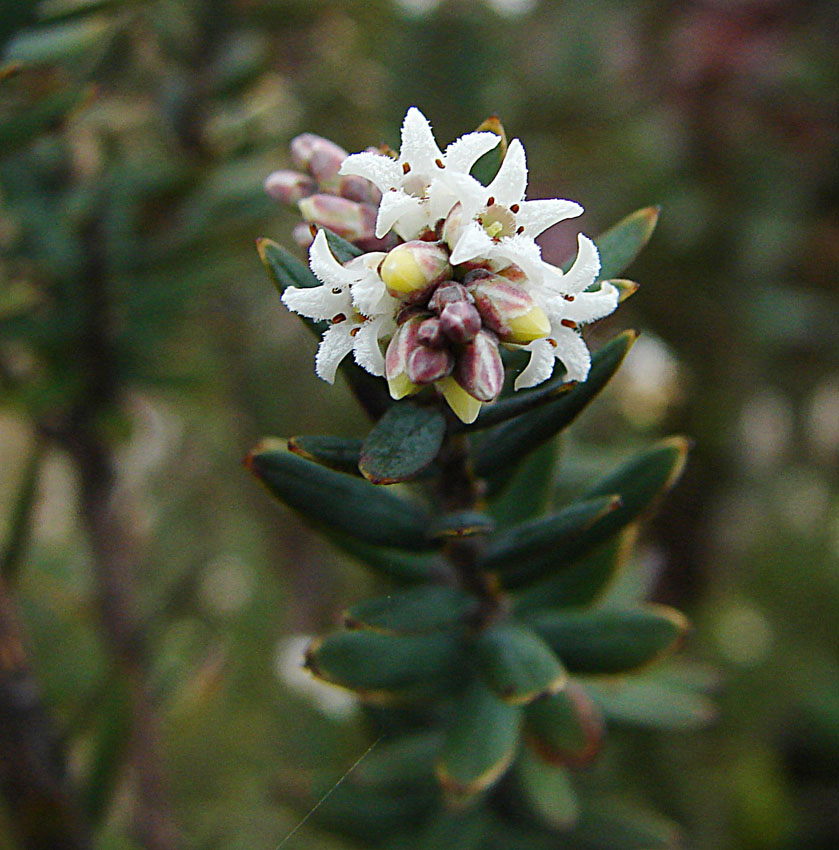
- Acrothamnus sauveolens found at the tree line of Mount Kinabalu, Borneo

Scientific classification
- Kingdom: Plantae
- Clade: Tracheophytes
- Clade: Angiosperms
- Clade: Eudicots
- Clade: Asterids
- Order: Ericales
- Family: Ericaceae
- Genus: Acrothamnus
- Species: A. suaveolens

Binomial name
- Acrothamnus suaveolens (Hook.f.) Quinn (2005)

Synonyms
- Leucopogon philippinensis (Merr.) Hosok. (1940); Leucopogon suaveolens Hook.f. (1852); Styphelia obtusifolia J.J.Sm. (1912); Styphelia obtusifolia var. hypoleuca J.J.Sm. (1912); Styphelia philippinensis Merr. (1922); Styphelia spicata J.J.Sm. (1917); Styphelia suaveolens (Hook.f.) Warb. ex P.Sarasin & Sarasin (1905); Styphelia trilocularis J.J.Sm. (1912); Styphelia trilocularis var. quinquelocularis J.J.Sm. (1912); Styphelia vandewateri Wernham (1916)

= Acrothamnus suaveolens =

Species of flowering plant

Acrothamnus suaveolens is a shrub in the family Ericaceae. It is found in alpine and sub-alpine areas of the Indomalayan and Australasian realms, including Mount Kinabalu in Borneo, Davao and Mount Apo on Mindanao, the Bantaeng mountains in southwestern Sulawesi, and Mount Fetin on Timor. It is also found in sub-alpine grasslands and shrublands on Mount Wilhelm in New Guinea and the highlands of Bougainville Island.
