= Elegant margareta rat =

Conservation status
- Near Threatened (IUCN 3.1)]

Scientific classification
- Kingdom: Animalia
- Phylum: Chordata
- Class: Mammalia
- Order: Rodentia
- Family: Muridae
- Genus: Margaretamys
- Species: M. elegans

Binomial name
- Margaretamys elegans Musser, 1981

Species of rodent

The elegant margareta rat (Margaretamys elegans) is a species of rodent in the family Muridae. It is endemic to the island of Sulawesi in Indonesia.
