= Mekongga Mountains =

Indonesian mountain range

Coordinates: 03°41′27″S 121°17′52″E

Gunung Mekongga
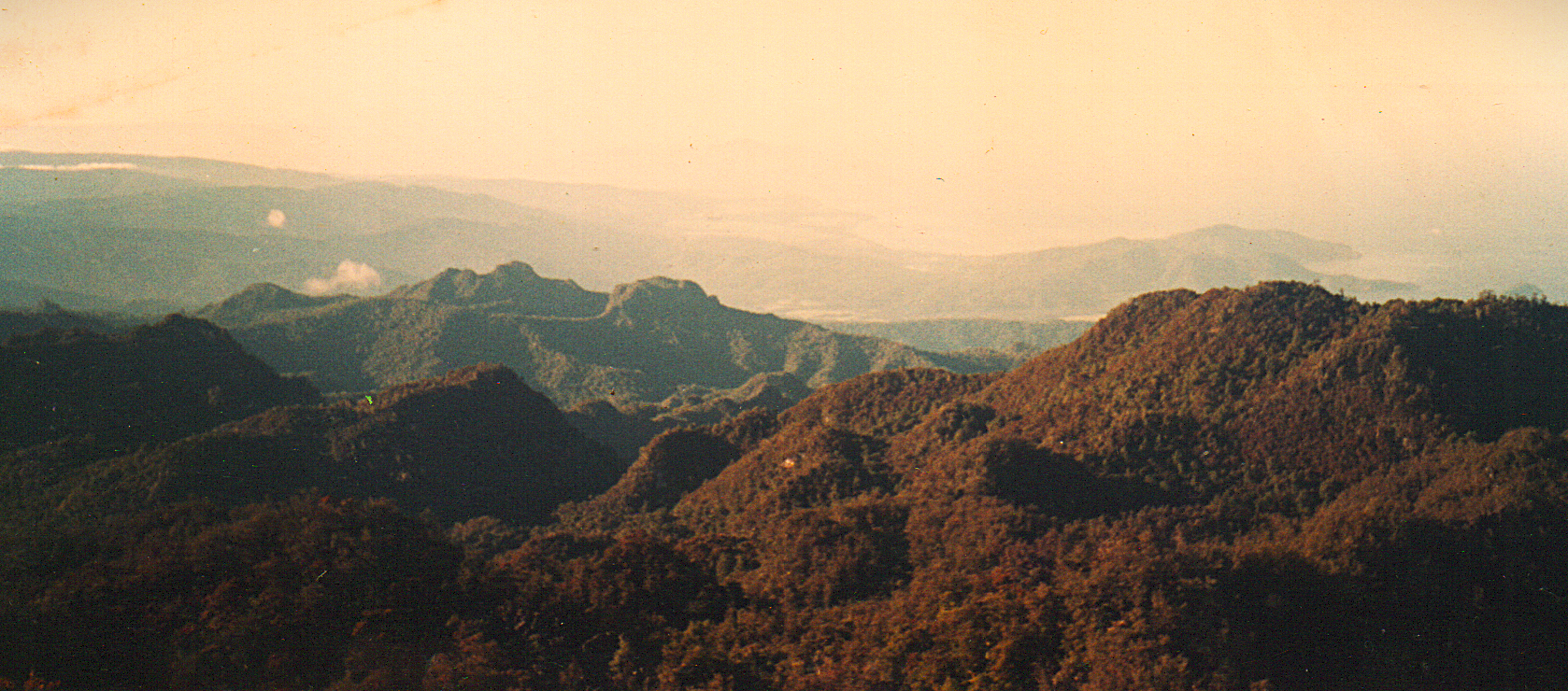
- Panorama from the summit of Mekongga

Highest point
- Elevation: 2,650 m (8,690 ft)
- Prominence: 2,221 m (7,287 ft)
- Listing: Ultra; Ribu

Geography
- Location within Sulawesi
- Location: Sulawesi, Indonesia

Climbing
- Easiest route: Long hike

The Mekongga Mountains (Pegunungan Mekongga, Bingkoka Mountains) are a range of mountains on the island of Sulawesi (Celebes), in Indonesia. Running north-west–southeast, on the western side of the southeast peninsula of the island, they are parallel to and west of the Tanggeasinua Range and lie in the province of Southeast Sulawesi. The mountain, Gunung Mekongga, is the highest point at 2,650 metres (8,694 ft).

== See also ==
- List of ultras of the Malay Archipelago
