= Sarcocystis host–parasite relations =

Infections with single-celled parasites

Sarcocystis is a genus of parasitic Apicomplexan alveolates. Species in this genus infect reptiles, birds and mammals. The name is derived from Greek: sarkos = flesh and kystis = bladder.

There are about 130 recognised species in this genus. Revision of the taxonomy of this genus is ongoing and it is possible that all the currently recognised species may in fact be a single species or much smaller number of species that can infect multiple hosts.

The parasite's life cycle typically involves a predator and a prey animal. A single species may infect multiple prey or predator animals. In at least 56 species definitive and intermediate hosts are known. Many species are named after their recognised hosts

Further material on this genus can be found on the Sarcocystis page.

== Mammalian species infected ==
=== Superorder Euarchontoglires ===
Order Lagomorpha

- rabbit (Oryctolagus cuniculus)
- cottontail rabbits (Sylvilagus floridanus)

Order Primates

- human (Homo sapiens)
- slow loris (Nycticebus coucang)
- baboon (Papio cynocephalus)
- tamarin (Saguinus oedipus)

Genus Macaca

- crab-eating macaque (Macaca fascicularis)
- rhesus monkey (Macaca mulatta)

Order Rodentia

Family Cricetidae

- varying lemming (Dicrostonyx richardsoni)
- prairie voles (Microtus ochrogaster)
- woodrat (Neotoma micropus)
- muskrat (Ondatra zibethica)
- Djungarian hamsters (Phodopus sungorus)
- deer mice (Peromyscus maniculatus)
- cotton rat (Sigmodon hispidus)

Family Erinaceidae

- moonrat (Echinosorex gymnura)

Family Muridae

- bandicoot rat (Bandicota indica)
- African soft-furred rat (Mastomys natalensis)
- house mouse (Mus musculus)
- Mongolian gerbil (Meriones unguiculatus)
- Sulawesi giant rat (Paruromys dominator)

Genus Bunomys

- yellow-haired hill rat (Bunomys chrysocomus)
- fraternal hill rat (Bunomys fratrorum)

Genus Maxomys

- Bartels's spiny rat (Maxomys bartelsii)
- Musschenbroek's spiny rat (Maxomys musschenbroekii)

Genus Rattus

- Polynesian rat (Rattus exulans)
- bush rat (Rattus fuscipes)
- brown rats (Rattus norvegicus)
- yellow-tailed rat (Rattus xanthurus)

Family Sciuridae

- eastern chipmunk (Tamias striatus)

Genus Spermophilus

- Richardson's ground squirrel (Spermophilus richardsonii)
- 13-lined ground squirrels (Spermophilus tridecemlineatus tridecemlineatus)

=== Superorder Laurasiatheria ===
Order Artiodactyla

Suborder Ruminantia

Family Antilocapridae

- pronghorn (Antilocapra americana)

Family Bovidae

- water buffalo (Bubalus bubalis)
- Grant's gazelle (Nanger granti)
- mountain goat (Oreamnos americanus)
- Mongolian gazelle (Procapra gutturosa)
- chamois (Rupicapra rupicapra)
- African buffalo (Syncerus caffer)

Genus Bison

- bison (Bison bison)
- wisent (Bison bonasus)

Genus Bos

- yak (Bos grunniens)
- cattle (Bos taurus)
- dwarf zebu (Bos taurus)

Genus Capra

- goat (Capra aegagrus hircus)
- alpine ibex (Capra ibex)

Genus Ovis

- European mouflons (Ovis ammon musimon)
- sheep (Ovis aries)

Family Cervidae

- moose (Alces alces)
- mule deer (Odocoileus hemionus)
- reindeer (Rangifer tarandus tarandus)

Genus Cervus

- American elk (Cervus canadensis)
- roe deer (Cervus capreolus)
- hard ground swamp deer (Cervus duvauceli branderi)
- red deer (Cervus elaphus)
- elk (Cervus elaphus)

Genus Dama

- fallow deer (Dama dama dama)
- Persian fallow deer (Dama dama mesopotamica)

Family Giraffidae

- giraffe (Giraffa camelopardalis)

Suborder Suina

- warthog (Phacochoerus aethiopicus)
- pig (Sus scrofa scrofa)

Suborder Tylopoda

Genus Camelus

- camel (Camelus dromedarius)

Genus Lama

- llama (Lama glama)
- guanaco (Lama guanicoe)

Genus Vicugna

- vicuña (Vicugna vicugna)
- alpaca (Vicugna pacos)

Order Carnivora

Suborder Caniformia

Family Canidae

Genus Nyctereutes

- raccoon dog (Nyctereutes procyonoides)

Genus Vulpes

- red fox (Vulpes vulpes)

Tribe Canini

Genus Canis

- dog (Canis lupus familiaris)
- coyote (Canis latrans)
- wolf (Canis lupus)

Genus Lycaon

- wild dog (Lycaon pictus)

Superfamily Pinnipedia

Family Phocidae

- bearded seal (Erignathus barbatus)
- Hawaiian monk seal (Monachus schauinslandi)
- Pacific harbor seals (Phoca vitulina richardsi)

Family Otariidae

- northern fur seal (Callorhinus ursinus)
- sea lion (Zalophus californianus)

Family Mustelidae

- sea otter (Enhydra lutris)
- otter (Lutra lutra)
- European badger (Meles meles)
- skunk (Mephitis mephitis)
- American badger (Taxidea taxus)

Genus Mustela

- common European weasel (Mustela nivalis)
- mink (Mustela vison)

Family Procyonidae

- raccoon (Procyon lotor)

Family Ursidae

Genus Ursus

- black bears (Ursus americanus)
- polar bears (Ursus maritimus)

Suborder Feloidea

Genus Felis

- cougar (Felis concolor coryi)
- cougar (Felis concolor stanleyana)
- cat (Felis domesticus)
- bobcats (Felis rufus floridanus)

Genus Panthera

- African lions (Panthera leo)
- leopards (Panthera pardus)
- tigers (Panthera tigris)

Order Cetacea

- beluga whale (Delphinapterus leucas)
- Atlantic white-sided dolphins (Lagenorhynchus acutus)
- striped dolphin (Stenella coeruleoalba)

Order Perissodactyla

Genus Equus

- donkey (Equus asinus)
- horse (Equus caballus)

=== Superorder Xenarthra ===
- Hoffmann's two-toed sloth (Choloepus hoffmanni)
- nine-banded armadillo (Dasypus novemcinctus)

=== Marsupials ===
- Bennett's wallaby (Macropus rufogriseus)
- unadorned rock wallaby (Petrogale assimilis)
- Tasmanian pademelon (Thylogale billardierii)

Genus Didelphis

- white-eared opossum (Didelphis albiventris)
- Virginia opossum (Didelphis virginiana)

== Bird species infected ==
This genus infects at least 11 orders, 22 families, 38 genera and 46 species.

Order Anseriformes

Family Anatidae

- redhead duck (Aythya americana)
- Canada goose (Branta canadensis)
- common goldeneye (Bucephala clangula)
- blue-winged teal (Querquedula discors)

Genus Anas

- northern pintail (Anas acuta)
- northern shoveler (Anas clypeata)
- blue-winged teal (Anas discors)
- mallard (Anas platyrhynchos)
- American black duck (Anas rubripes)
- gadwall (Anas strepera)

Order Ciconiiformes

Family Ardeidae

- great blue heron (Ardea herodias)
- green backed herons (Butorides striatus)
- great egret (Casmerodius albus)
- little blue heron (Egretta caerulea)

Family Threskiornithidae

- American white ibis (Eudocimus albus)

Order Charadriiformes

Family Scolopacidae

- Wilson's snipe (Gallinago delicata)
- American woodcock (Scolopax minor)

Order Coliiformes

Family Coliidae

- red-faced mousebird (Urocolius indicus)

Order Columbiformes

Family Columbidae

- morning doves (Zenaida macroura)

Order Falconiformes

Family Accipitridae

- Cooper's hawk (Accipiter cooperii)
- goshawk (Accipiter gentilis)
- sparrowhawk (Accipiter nisus)
- red-tailed hawk (Buteo jamaicensis)
- bald eagle (Haliaeetus leucocephalus)

Family Falconidae

- falconids (genus Falco)

Order Galliformes

Family Phasianidae

- wild turkey (Meleagris gallopavo)
- common pheasant (Phasianus colchicus)
- sharp-tailed grouse (Tympanuchus phasianellus)

Family Tetraonidae

- capercaillies (Tetrao urogallus)

Order Passeriformes

Family Fringillidae

- canary (Serinus canaria)

Family Icteridae

- great-tailed grackle (Cassidix mexicanus)
- cowbirds (Molothrus ater)
- common crackle (Quiscalus quiscula)

Family Paridae

- great tit (Parus major)

Family Turdidae

- European blackbird (Turdus merula)

Order Pelecaniformes

Family Sulidae

- northern gannet (Morus bassanus)

Order Phoenicopteriformes

Family Phoenicopteridae

- lesser flamingo (Phoeniconaias minor)

Order Psittaciformes

Family Psittacidae

- Patagonian conure (Cyanoliseus patagonus)
- budgerigars (Melopsittacus undulatus)
- thick-billed parrot (Rhynchopsitta pachyrhyncha)

Order Strigiformes

Family Strigidae

- long-eared owl (Asio otus)
- snowy owls (Nyctea scandiaca)

Genus Strix

- northern spotted owl (Strix occidentalis caurina)
- barred owl (Strix varia)

Family Tytonidae

Genus Tyto

- European barn owl (Tyto alba)
- masked owl (Tyto novaehollandiae)

== Reptile species infected ==
=== Snakes ===
Family Colubridae

- Dahl's whip snake (Coluber najadum)
- Rio tropical racer (Mastigodryas bifossatus)
- gopher snake (Pituophis melanoleucus)
- bullsnake (Pituophis melanoleucus sayi)

Family Elapidae

- tiger snake (Notechis ater)

Family Pythonidae

- black-headed python (Aspidites melanocephalus)
- carpet python (Morelia spilotes)
- Malaysian reticulated python (Python reticulatus)

Family Viperidae

- southern copperhead (Agkistrodon contortrix contortrix)
- Mojave rattlesnake (Crotalus scutulatus scutulatus)
- Arabian saw-scaled viper (Echis coloratus)
- desert viper (Pseudocerastes persicus)
- Palestinian viper (Daboia palaestinae)

=== Lizards ===
Family Chamaeleonidae

- Fischer's chameleon (Chamaleo fischeri)

Family Gekkonidae

- Mediterranean house gecko (Hemidactylus turcicus)
- fan-footed gecko (Ptyodactylus guttatus)
- Jordan short-fingered gecko (Stenodactylus grandiceps)

Family Lacertidae

- Gran Canarian giant lizard (Gallotia stehlini)

Family Scincidae

- ocellated skink (Chalcides ocellatus)

Family Teiidae

- common ameiva (Ameiva ameiva)

== Species infecting mammals ==
- Sarcocystis americana
- Sarcocystis arieticanis
- Sarcocystis asinus
- Sarcocystis aucheniae
- Sarcocystis bertrami
- Sarcocystis bigemina
- Sarcocystis booliati
- Sarcocystis bovifelis
- Sarcocystis bovicanis
- Sarcocystis bovihominis
- Sarcocystis buffalonis
- Sarcocystis cameli
- Sarcocystis camelopardalis
- Sarcocystis campestris
- Sarcocystis canis
- Sarcocystis capracanis
- Sarcocystis cernae
- Sarcocystis cervicanis
- Sarcocystis cuniculi
- Sarcocystis crotali
- Sarcocystis cruzi
- Sarcocystis cymruensis
- Sarcocystis danzani
- Sarcocystis dasypi
- Sarcocystis debonei
- Sarcocystis diminuta
- Sarcocystis dirumpens
- Sarcocystis dubeyella
- Sarcocystis dubeyi
- Sarcocystis equicanis
- Sarcocystis fayeri
- Sarcocystis felis
- Sarcocystis fusiformis
- Sarcocystis garnhami
- Sarcocystis gigantea
- Sarcocystis giraffae
- Sarcocystis gracilis
- Sarcocystis greineri
- Sarcocystis grueneri
- Sarcocystis hardangeri
- Sarcocystis hemioni
- Sarcocystis hemionilatrantis
- Sarcocystis hericanis
- Sarcocystis hirsuta
- Sarcocystis hjorti
- Sarcocystis hofmanni
- Sarcocystis hominis
- Sarcocystis horvathi
- Sarcocystis hircicanis
- Sarcocystis iberica
- Sarcocystis idahoensis
- Sarcocystis inghami
- Sarcocystis jorrini
- Sarcocystis klaseriensis
- Sarcocystis kirkpatricki
- Sarcocystis kortei
- Sarcocystis lamacanis
- Sarcocystis leporum
- Sarcocystis levinei
- Sarcocystis lindemanni
- Sarcocystis lindsayi
- Sarcocystis linearis
- Sarcocystis medusiformis
- Sarcocystis meischeriana
- Sarcocystis mephitisi
- Sarcocystis mihoensis
- Sarcocystis mongolica
- Sarcocystis morae
- Sarcocystis moulei
- Sarcocystis mucosa
- Sarcocystis murinotechis
- Sarcocystis muris
- Sarcocystis neotomafelis
- Sarcocystis muriviperae
- Sarcocystis neuroma
- Sarcocystis nesbitti
- Sarcocystis odoi
- Sarcocystis orientalis
- Sarcocystis ovicanis
- Sarcocystis ovifelis
- Sarcocystis oviformis
- Sarcocystis ovalis
- Sarcocystis phacochoeri
- Sarcocystis porcifelis
- Sarcocystis rangi
- Sarcocystis rangiferi
- Sarcocystis rauschorum
- Sarcocystis sebeki
- Sarcocystis sibirica
- Sarcocystis sigmodontis
- Sarcocystis suicanis
- Sarcocystis suihominis
- Sarcocystis sulawesiensis
- Sarcocystis sybillensis
- Sarcocystis tarandi
- Sarcocystis tilopodi
- Sarcocystis tenella
- Sarcocystis ursusi
- Sarcocystis venatoria
- Sarcocystis wapiti

== Species infecting birds ==
- Sarcocystis accipitris
- Sarcocystis cornixi
- Sarcocystis debonei
- Sarcocystis dispersa
- Sarcocystis falcatula
- Sarcocystis horvathi
- Sarcocystis kirmsei
- Sarcocystis phoeniconaii
- Sarcocystis rauschorum
- Sarcocystis rileyi
- Sarcocystis turdi

== Species infecting reptiles ==
- Sarcocystis ameivamastigodryasi
- Sarcocystis atheridis
- Sarcocystis chamaleonis
- Sarcocystis gerbilliechis
- Sarcocystis gongyli
- Sarcocystis idahoensis
- Sarcocystis mitrani
- Sarcocystis murinotechis
- Sarcocystis muriviperae
- Sarcocystis podarcicolubris
- Sarcocystis roudabushi
- Sarcocystis stehlinii
- Sarcocystis stenodactylicolubris
- Sarcocystis turcicii
- Sarcocystis villivilliso
- Sarcocystis zaman

== Species infected but parasite not yet identified ==
A number of species have been identified as being infected with Sarcocytis but the parasite itself has not been identified to species level. These host species include:

- Mammals

pronghorn (Antilocapra americana), yak (Bos grunniens), northern fur seal (Callorhinus ursinus), camel (Camelus dromedarius), alpine ibex (Capra ibex), hard ground swamp deer (Cervus duvauceli branderi), red deer (Cervus elaphus), Hoffmann's two-toed sloth (Choloepus hoffmanni), beluga whale (Delphinapterus leucas), sea otter (Enhydra lutris), bearded seal (Erignathus barbatus), donkey (Equus asinus), cougars (Felis concolor coryi, Felis concolor stanleyana), bobcat (Felis rufus floridanus), Atlantic white-sided dolphins (Lagenorhynchus acutus), guanaco (Lama guanicoe), alpaca (Vicugna pacos), otter (Lutra lutra), wild dog (Lycaon pictus), Bartels's spiny rat (Maxomys bartelsii), Musschenbroek's spiny rat (Maxomys musschenbroekii), prairie vole (Microtus ochrogaster), common European weasel (Mustela nivalis), mink (Mustela vison), muskrat (Ondatra zibethica), mountain goats (Oreamnos americanus), Grant's gazelle (Nanger granti), slow loris (Nycticebus coucang), African lions (Panthera leo), leopard (Panthera pardus), tiger (Panthera tigris), baboon (Papio cynocephalus), Pacific harbor seal (Phoca vitulina richardsi) chamois (Rupicapra rupicapra), Polynesian rat (Rattus exulans), bush rat (Rattus fuscipes), yellow-tailed rat (Rattus xanthurus), tamarin (Saguinus oedipus), cottontail rabbit (Sylvilagus floridanus), African buffalo (Syncerus caffer), eastern chipmunk (Tamias striatus), polar bear (Ursus maritimus), sea lion (Zalophus californianus) and hainag (also known as dzo or khainag)

- Birds

goshawk (Accipiter gentilis), great blue heron (Ardea herodias), green backed heron (Butorides striatus), great egret (Casmerodius albus), little blue heron (Egretta caerulea), American white ibis (Eudocimus albus), bald eagle (Haliaeetus leucocephalus), wild turkey (Meleagris gallopavo), northern gannet (Morus bassanus), yellow-crowned night heron (Nyctanassa violacea), common pheasant (Phasianus colchicus), thick-billed parrot (Rhynchopsitta pachyrhyncha), northern spotted owl (Strix occidentalis caurina), capercaillies (Tetrao urogallus), masked owl (Tyto novaehollandiae) and mourning doves (Zenaida macroura)

- Reptiles

southern copperhead (Agkistrodon contortrix contortrix), rhinoceros horned viper (Bitis nasicornis), carpet python (Morelia spilotes) and desert viper (Pseudocerastes persicus)

== Hosts infected where parasite species is known ==
- S. accipitris - canary (Serinus canaria) - sparrowhawk (Accipiter nisus)
- S. ameivamastigodryasi - teiid lizard (Ameiva ameiva) - Rio tropical racer (Mastigodryas bifossatus)
- S. americana - mule deer (Odocoileus hemionus)
- S. arieticanis - European mouflons (Ovis ammon musimon), sheep (Ovis aries)
- S. asinus - horse (Equus caballus) - dog (Canis familiaris)
- S. atheridis - Nitsche's bush viper (Atheris nitschei nitschei)
- S. aucheniae - llama (Lama glama), alpaca (Vicugna pacos), vicuña (Vicugna vicugna)
- S. bertrami - horse (Equus caballus) - dog (Canis familiaris)
- S. bigemina - dog (Canis familiaris)
- S. booliati - moonrat (Echinosorex gymnura)
- S. bovifelis - cattle (Bos taurus) - cat (Felis domesticus)
- S. bovicanis - cattle (Bos taurus) - dog (Canis familiaris)
- S. bovihominis - cattle (Bos taurus) - human (Homo sapiens)
- S. buffalonis - water buffalo (Bubalus bubalis)
- S. cameli - dog (Canis familiaris)
- S. camelopardalis - giraffe (Giraffa camelopardalis)
- S. campestris - Richardson's ground squirrel (Spermophilus richardsonii), 13-lined ground squirrels (Spermophilus tridecemlineatus tridecemlineatus) - American badger (Taxidea taxus)
- S. canis - Hawaiian monk seal (Monachus schauinslandi), striped dolphin (Stenella coeruleoalba), red fox (Vulpes vulpes)
- S. capracanis - goat (Capra aegagrus hircus), sheep (Ovis aries) - dog (Canis familiaris), red fox (Vulpes vulpes)
- S. cernae - mouse (genus Microtus) - falconids (genus Falco)
- S. cervicanis - roe deer (Cervus capreolus), red deer (Cervus elaphus hispanicus)
- S. chamaleonis - Fischer's chameleon (Chamaleo fischeri)
- S. cornixi - hooded crow (Corvus cornix)
- S. cuniculi - rabbit (Oryctolagus cuniculus) - cat (Felis domesticus)
- S. crotali - house mouse (Mus musculus) - Mojave rattlesnake (Crotalus scutulatus scutulatus)
- S. cruzi - bison (Bison bison), wisent (Bison bonasus), cattle (Bos taurus) dwarf zebu (Bos taurus) - dog (Canis familiaris), coyote (Canis latrans), wolf (Canis lupus), raccoon dog (Nyctereutes procyonoides), raccoon (Procyon lotor), fox (Vulpes species)
- S. cymruensis - bandicoot rats (Bandicota indica), brown rats (Rattus norvegicus) - cat (Felis catus)
- S. danzani - Mongolian gazelle (Procapra gutturosa)
- S. dasypi - nine-banded armadillo (Dasypus novemcinctus)
- S. debonei - cowbirds (Molothrus ater), great-tailed grackle (Cassidix mexicanus), common crackle (Quiscalus quiscula) - opossum (Didelphis virginiana)
- S. diminuta - nine-banded armadillo (Dasypus novemcinctus)
- S. dirumpens - African soft-furred rat (Mastomys natalensis), house mouse (Mus musculus), brown rat (Rattus norvegicus), Mongolian gerbil (Meriones unguiculatus), Djungarian hamsters (Phodopus sungorus)
- S. dispersa - long-eared owl (Asio otus), European barn owl (Tyto alba)
- S. dubeyella - warthog (Phacochoerus aethiopicus)
- S. dubeyi - water buffalo (Bubalus bubalis)
- S. equicanis - horse (Equus caballus) - dog (Canis familiaris)
- S. falcatula - Patagonian conure (Cyanoliseus patagonus), budgerigars (Melopsittacus undulatus)
- S. fayeri - horse (Equus caballus) - dog (Canis familiaris)
- S. felis - cat (Felis domesticus)
- S. fusiformis - water buffalo (Bubalus bubalis) - cat (Felis domesticus)
- S. garnhami - opossum (Didelphis marsupialis)
- S. gerbilliechis - Arabian saw-scaled viper (Echis coloratus)
- S. gigantea - sheep (Ovis aries) - cat (Felis domesticus)
- S. giraffae - giraffe (Giraffa camelopardalis)
- S. gongyli - skink (Chalcides ocellatus)
- S. gracilis - roe deer (Cervus capreolus) - dog (Canis familiaris)
- S. greineri - Virginia opossum (Didelphis virginiana)
- S. grueneri - fallow deer (Dama dama dama), Persian fallow deer (Dama dama mesopotamica), reindeer (Rangifer tarandus tarandus)
- S. hardangeri - reindeer (Rangifer tarandus tarandus)
- S. hemioni - mule deer (Odocoileus hemionus)
- S. hemionilatrantis - mule deer (Odocoileus hemionus) - dog (Canis familiaris), coyote (Canis latrans)
- S. hericanis - goat (Capra aegagrus hircus) - dog (Canis familiaris)
- S. hirsuta - wisent (Bison bonasus), cattle (Bos taurus) - cat (Felis domesticus)
- S. hjorti - red deer (Cervus elaphus hispanicus)
- S. hofmanni - roe deer (Capreolus capreolus), fallow deer (Dama dama dama) - European badger (Meles meles)
- S. hominis - wisent (Bison bonasus), cattle (Bos taurus) - human (Homo sapiens)
- S. horvathi - chicken (Gallus gallus) - dog (Canis familiaris)
- S. hircicanis - goat (Capra aegagrus hircus) - dog (Canis familiaris)
- S. iberica - red deer (Cervus elaphus hispanicus)
- S. idahoensis - deer mice (Peromyscus maniculatus) - gopher snake (Pituophis melanoleucus), bullsnake (Pituophis melanoleucus sayi)
- S. inghami - opossum (Didelphis virginiana)
- S. jorrini - fallow deer (Cervus dama)
- S. klaseriensis - giraffe (Giraffa camelopardalis)
- S. kirmsei - hill mynah (Gracula religiosa)
- S. kirkpatricki - raccoon (Procyon lotor)
- S. kortei - rhesus monkey (Macaca mulatta)
- S. leporum - cottontail rabbit (Sylvilagus floridanus) - cat (Felis domesticus)
- S. levinei - water buffalo (Bubalus bubalis) - dog (Canis familiaris)
- S. lindemanni - human (Homo sapiens)
- S. lindsayi - opossum (Didelphis albiventris)
- S. linearis - red deer (Cervus elaphus hispanicus)
- S. medusiformis - sheep (Ovis aries), pig (Sus scrofa scrofa) - dog (Canis familiaris), cat (Felis domesticus)
- S. meischeriana - pig (Sus scrofa scrofa) - dog (Canis familiaris), raccoon dog (Nyctereutes procyonoides)
- S. mephitisi - skunk (Mephitis mephitis)
- S. mihoensis - sheep (Ovis aries) - dog (Canis familiaris)
- S. mitrani - skink (Scincus mitranus)
- S. mongolica - Mongolian gazelle (Procapra gutturosa)
- S. morae - red deer (Cervus elaphus hispanicus)
- S. moulei - goat (Capra aegagrus hircus) - cat (Felis domesticus)
- S. mucosa - Bennetts wallabies (Macropus rufogriseus), unadorned rock wallabies (Petrogale assimilis), Tasmanian pademelons (Thylogale billardierii)
- S. murinotechis - rat (Rattus norvegicus) - tiger snakes (Notechis ater)
- S. muris - mouse (Mus musculus) - cat (Felis domesticus)
- S. neotomafelis - woodrat (Neotoma micropus)
- S. muriviperae - mouse (Mus musculus) - Palestinian viper (Daboia palaestinae)
- S. neuroma - horse (Equus caballus), nine-banded armadillo (Dasypus novemcinctus), opossums (Didelphis virginiana, Didelphis albiventris), sea otter (Enhydra lutris), cats (Felis domesticus), skunks (Mephitis mephitis), cowbirds (Molothrus ater), raccoons (Procyon lotor)
- S. nesbitti - crab-eating macaque (Macaca fascicularis), rhesus monkey (Macaca mulatta)
- S. odoi - white-tailed deer (Odocoileus virginianus)
- S. orientalis - goat (Capra aegagrus hircus), rat (Rattus norvegicus) - Malaysian reticulated python (Python reticulatus)
- S. ovicanis - sheep (Ovis aries) - dog (Canis familiaris)
- S. ovifelis - sheep (Ovis aries) - cat (Felis domesticus)
- S. oviformis - Norwegian roe deer (Capreolus capreolus)
- S. ovalis - moose (Alces alces)
- S. phacochoeri - warthog (Phacochoerus aethiopicus)
- S. phoeniconaii - lesser flamingo (Phoeniconaias mirror)
- S. porcifelis - pig (Sus scrofa scrofa) - cat (Felis domesticus)
- S. rangi - reindeer (Rangifer tarandus tarandus)
- S. rangiferi - reindeer (Rangifer tarandus tarandus)
- S. rauschorum - varying lemming (Dicrostonyx richardsoni) - snowy owls (Nyctea scandiaca)
- S. rileyi - northern pintail (Anas acuta), northern shoveler (Anas clypeata), blue-winged teal (Anas discors), mallard (Anas platyrhynchos), American black duck (Anas rubripes), gadwall (Anas strepera) - dog (Canis familiaris)
- S. roudabushi - bullsnake (Pituophis melanoleucus)
- S. sebeki - European badger (Meles meles)
- S. sibirica - roe deer (Cervus capreolus)
- S. singaporensis - black-headed python (Aspidites melanocephalus), reticulated python (Python reticulatus)
- S. sigmodontis - cotton rat (Sigmodon hispidus)
- S. stehlinii - Gran Canarian giant lizard (Gallotia stehlini)
- S. stenodactylicolubris - fan-footed gecko (Ptyodactylus guttatus), Jordan short-fingered gecko (Stenodactylus grandiceps) - Dahl's whip snake (Coluber najadum)
- S. suicanis - pig (Sus scrofa scrofa) - dog (Canis familiaris)
- S. suihominis - pig (Sus scrofa scrofa) - human (Homo sapiens)
- S. sulawesiensis - yellow-haired hill rat (Bunomys chrysocomus), fraternal hill rat (Bunomys fratrorum), Sulawesi giant rat (Paruromys dominator)
- S. sybillensis - elk (Cervus elaphus)
- S. tarandi - reindeer (Rangifer tarandus tarandus)
- S. tenella - sheep (Ovis aries) - dog (Canis familiaris), cat (Felis domesticus), red fox (Vulpes vulpes)
- S. tilopodi - guanaco (Lama guanicoe)
- S. turcicii - gecko (Hemidactylus turcicus)
- S. turdi - European blackbird (Turdus merula)
- S. ursusi - black bears (Ursus americanus)
- S. venatoria - red deer (Cervus elaphus hispanicus)
- S. villivilliso - black-headed python (Aspidites melanocephalus), Malaysian reticulated python (Python reticulatus)
- S. wapiti - American elk (Cervus canadensis)
- S. zamani - Malaysian reticulated python (Python reticulatus)

== Species infecting animals important to man ==
=== Species infecting cats ===
Sarcocystis bovifelis
Sarcocystis cymruensis
Sarcocystis felis
Sarcocystis fusiformis
Sarcocystis gigantea
Sarcocystis hirsuta
Sarcocystis leporum
Sarcocystis medusiformis
Sarcocystis moulei
Sarcocystis muris
Sarcocystis ovifelis
Sarcocystis tenella

=== Species infecting dogs ===
Sarcocystis asinus
Sarcocystis bertrami
Sarcocystis bigemina
Sarcocystis bovicanis
Sarcocystis cameli
Sarcocystis capracanis
Sarcocystis cruzi
Sarcocystis equicanis
Sarcocystis fayeri
Sarcocystis gracilis
Sarcocystis hemionilatrantis
Sarcocystis hericanis
Sarcocystis horvathi
Sarcocystis levinei
Sarcocystis medusiformis
Sarcocystis meischeriana
Sarcocystis mihoensis
Sarcocystis ovicanis
Sarcocystis rileyi
Sarcocystis suicanis
Sarcocystis tenella

=== Species infecting sheep ===
Sarcocystis arieticanis
Sarcocystis tenella (Sarcocystis ovicanis)
Sarcocystis gigantea (Sarcocystis ovifelis)
Sarcocystis medusiformis

=== Species infecting horses ===
Sarcocystis asinus
Sarcocystis bertrami
Sarcocystis equicanis
Sarcocystis fayeri
Sarcocystis neurona (Sarcocystis falcatula)

=== Species infecting pigs ===
Sarcocystis medusiformis
Sarcocystis meischeriana (Sarcocystis suicanis)
Sarcocystis porcifelis
Sarcocystis suihominis

=== Species infecting cattle ===
Sarcocystis bovifelis
Sarcocystis bovihominis (Sarcocystis hominis)
Sarcocystis cruzi (Sarcocystis bovicanis)
Sarcocystis hirsuta

=== Species infecting water buffalo ===
Sarcocystis buffalonis
Sarcocystis dubeyi
Sarcocystis fusiformis
Sarcocystis levinei

=== Species infecting goats ===
Sarcocystis capracanis
Sarcocystis hericanis
Sarcocystis moulei
Sarcocystis orientalis

=== Species infecting chickens ===
Sarcocystis horvathi

=== Species infecting reindeer ===
Sarcocystis hardangeri
Sarcocystis rangi
Sarcocystis rangiferi

=== Species infecting llamoids ===
Sarcocystis aucheniae
Sarcocystis tilopodi
