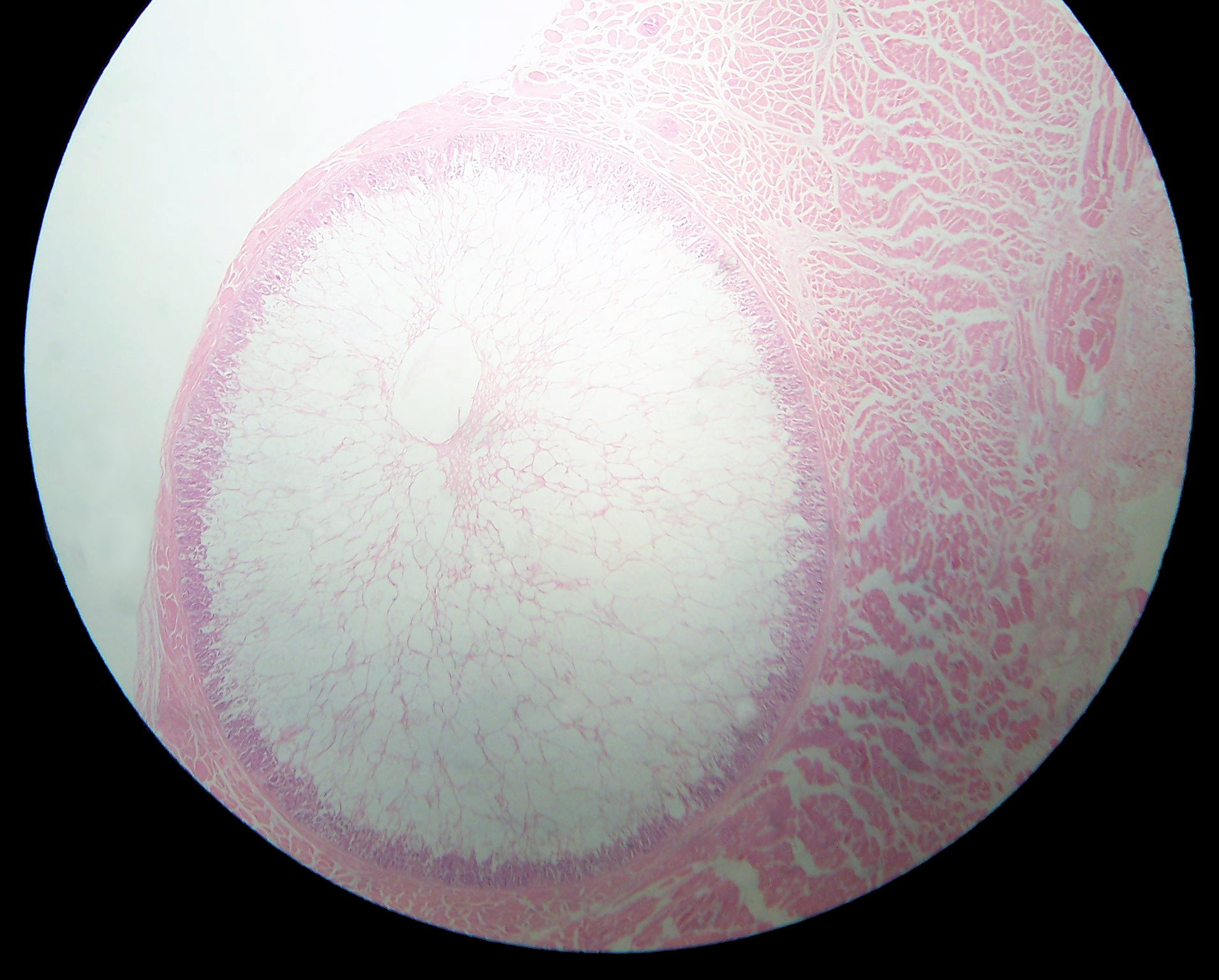
- Sarcocystis cyst in a sheep oesophagus. The cyst is approximately 4 mm across.

Scientific classification
- Domain: Eukaryota
- Supergroup: Alveolata
- Phylum: Apicomplexa
- Class: Conoidasida
- Order: Eucoccidiorida
- Family: Sarcocystidae
- Subfamily: Sarcocystinae
- Genus: Sarcocystis; Lankester, 1882

Species
- See Species section.

= Sarcocystis =

Genus of protists in the apicomplex phylum

Sarcocystis is a genus of protozoan parasites, with many species infecting mammals, reptiles and birds. Its name is derived from Greek sarx = flesh and kystis = bladder.

The lifecycle of a typical member of this genus involves two host species, a definitive host and an intermediate host. Often, the definitive host is a predator and the intermediate host is its prey. The parasite reproduces sexually in the gut of the definitive host, is passed with the feces, and ingested by the intermediate host. There, it eventually enters muscle tissue. When the intermediate host is eaten by the definitive host, the cycle is completed. The definitive host usually does not show any symptoms of infection, but the intermediate host does.

About 130 recognized species are in this genus. Revision of the taxonomy of the genus is ongoing, and all the currently recognized species may be a much smaller number of species that can infect multiple hosts.

== History ==
The organism was first recognized in a mouse by Miescher in 1843. His findings were not initially interpreted as involving a protist, and the literature referred to the structures he described as "Miescher's tubules". Incidentally, Miescher's son, Johann Friedrich Miescher, discovered DNA. Similar structures were found in pig muscle in 1865, but these remained unnamed until 1899, when the name Sarcocystis miescheriana was proposed for them.

Initially, whether these organisms were fungi or protozoa was unclear . This uncertainty was resolved in 1967 when electron microscopic studies showed that they were protozoa, related to Toxoplasma and Eimeria. The lifecycle remained unknown until 1970, when bradyzoites from sarcocysts in bird muscles were inoculated into cultured mammalian cells and seen to undergo development into sexual stages and oocysts. Transmission studies with Sarcocystis of cattle (then considered a single species, Sarcocystis fusiformis) in dogs, cats, and humans revealed three morphologically distinct species, which were named S. bovicanis, S. bovifelis, and S. bovihominis. This and post-1972 research on Sarcocystis was reviewed during the same decade; and that account is still a very useful source of information today.

== Lifecycle ==
The heteroxenous (more than one obligatory host) lifecycle of these apicomplexan parasites remained obscure until 1972, when the prey-predator relationship of its definitive and intermediate hosts was recognized. The lifecycles of about 60 of these species are now known.

In outline, gametogony and sporogony occur in the intestine of the definitive host, while both schizogony, which occurs in various tissues, and the formation of sarcocysts (containing bradyzoites and metrocytes) occurs principally in the muscles of the intermediate host. In some cases, a single species may act as both the definitive and intermediate host.

Oocysts are passed in the feces of an infected definitive host. The oocyst undergoes sporogony, creating two sporocysts. These sporocysts of Sarcocystis characteristically contain four sporozoites and measure approximately 15–19 by 8–10 μm. Oocysts of Sarcocystis are thin-walled and easily break open. The result is that sporocysts recovered from feces outnumber intact oocysts.

Intermediate hosts such as cattle or pigs then ingest sporocysts. Sporozoites are released in the body and migrate to vessels, where they undergo the first two generations of asexual reproduction. These rounds result in the development of meronts. This stage lasts about 15 to 16 days after ingestion of sporocysts. Merozoites emerge from the second-generation meronts and enter the mononucleated cells, where they develop by endodyogeny. Subsequent generations of merozoites develop downstream in the direction of blood flow to arterioles, capillaries, venules, and veins throughout the body, subsequently developing into the final asexual generation in muscles.

Merozoites entering muscle cells round up to form metrocytes and initiate sarcocyst formation. Sarcocysts begin as unicellular bodies containing a single metrocyte and through asexual multiplication numerous metrocytes accumulate and the sarcocyst increases in size. As the sarcocyst matures, the small, rounded, noninfectious metrocytes give rise to crescent-shaped bodies called bradyzoites (also known as "bradyzoic merozoites") that are infectious for the definitive host. The time required for maturation varies with the species and may take 2 months or more.

In species in which symptoms develop, these typically occur 20–40 days after ingestion of sporocysts and during the subsequent migration of sporozoites through the body vessels. Acute lesions (oedema, hemorrhages, and necrosis) develop in the affected tissues. The parasite has a predilection for skeletal muscle (myositis), cardiac muscle (petechial hemorrhages of cardiac muscle and serosae), and lymph nodes (oedema, necrosis, and hemorrhage). These lesions are associated with maturation of second generation of meronts within the endothelial and subendothelials cells. Occasionally mononuclear infiltration or hyperemia has been observed in the lamina propria of the small intestine. After the acute phase, cysts may be found in various muscular tissues, generally without pathology.

Once the intermediate host is eaten by the definitive host, such as a dog or human, the parasite undergoes sexual reproduction within the gut to create macrogamonts and microgamonts. Most definitive hosts do not show any clinical signs or symptoms. Fusion of a macrogamont and a microgamont creates a zygote, which develops into an oocyst. The oocyst is passed through the faeces, completing the lifecycle.

A second lifecycle has more recently been described whereby carnivores and omnivores pass the infectious stages in their faeces. Ingestion of this material may lead to successful infection of the ingesting animal.

=== Birds ===
Although sarcocysts were first reported in the muscles of birds by Kuhn in 1865, the first lifecycle involving a bird (Gallus gallus) and a carnivore (Canis familiaris) was not described until 1977 by Munday et al. In 1986 the first life cycle involving birds as both the definitive (northern goshawk – Accipiter gentilis) and intermediate (Atlantic canary – Serinus canaria) hosts was described by Cerná and Kvasnovská.

== Taxonomy ==
The taxonomy of this genus and its relationship to other protozoal genera are currently under investigation.

Related genera include: Besnoitia, Caryospora, Cystoisospora, Frenkelia, Isospora, Hammondia, Hyaloklossia, Lankesterella, Neospora, and Toxoplasma.

Sarcocystis is the largest genus within the family Sarcocystidae and consists of species that infect a range of animals, including mammals, birds, and reptiles. Frenkelia, another genus within this family, consists of parasites that use rodents as intermediate hosts and birds of prey as definitive hosts.

Besnoitia, Hammondia, Neospora, and Toxoplasma apparently form a single clade. Within this clade, Toxoplasma and Neospora appear to be sister clades. Isospora also appears to belong to this clade and this clade is a sister to Sarcocystis. Frenkelia appears to be very closely related to Sarcocystis.

Several molecular studies have suggested that Frenkelia is actually a species of Sarcocystis. This genus was distinguished from Sarcocystis on the basis of its tendency to encyst within the brain rather than within muscle. This distinction may not be taxonomically valid.

Within the genus, a number of clades have been identified. These include one that contains S. dispersa, S. lacertae, S. mucosa, S. muris, S. neurona, and S. rodentifelis. Frenkelia also groups with this clade.

== Species ==
- Sarcocystis accipitris
- Sarcocystis alces
- Sarcocystis alceslatrans
- Sarcocystis ameivamastigodryasi
- Sarcocystis americana
- Sarcocystis arieticanis
- Sarcocystis asinus
- Sarcocystis atheridis
- Sarcocystis aucheniae
- Sarcocystis bertrami
- Sarcocystis bigemina
- Sarcocystis booliati
- Sarcocystis bovicanis
- Sarcocystis bovifelis
- Sarcocystis bovihominis
- Sarcocystis buffalonis
- Sarcocystis calchasi
- Sarcocystis cameli
- Sarcocystis camelopardalis
- Sarcocystis campestris
- Sarcocystis chamaleonis
- Sarcocystis cernae
- Sarcocystis cervi
- Sarcocystis cervicanis
- Sarcocystis canis
- Sarcocystis capracanis
- Sarcocystis cornixi
- Sarcocystis crotali
- Sarcocystis cruzi
- Sarcocystis cuniculi
- Sarcocystis cymruensis
- Sarcocystis danzani
- Sarcocystis dasypi
- Sarcocystis debonei
- Sarcocystis diminuta
- Sarcocystis dirumpens
- Sarcocystis dispersa
- Sarcocystis dubeyella
- Sarcocystis dubeyi
- Sarcocystis equicanis
- Sarcocystis falcatula
- Sarcocystis fayeri
- Sarcocystis felis
- Sarcocystis fulicae
- Sarcocystis fusiformis
- Sarcocystis gallotiae
- Sarcocystis garnhami
- Sarcocystis gracilis
- Sarcocystis grueneri
- Sarcocystis halieti
- Sarcocystis hoarensis
- Sarcocystis fusiformis
- Sarcocystis gallotiae
- Sarcocystis gerbilliechis
- Sarcocystis gigantea
- Sarcocystis giraffae
- Sarcocystis gongyli
- Sarcocystis gracilis
- Sarcocystis greineri
- Sarcocystis grueneri
- Sarcocystis hardangeri
- Sarcocystis hemioni
- Sarcocystis hemionilatrantis
- Sarcocystis hericanis
- Sarcocystis hircicanis
- Sarcocystis hirsuta
- Sarcocystis hjorti
- Sarcocystis hofmanni
- Sarcocystis hominis
- Sarcocystis horvathi
- Sarcocystis iberica
- Sarcocystis idahoensis
- Sarcocystis inghami
- Sarcocystis jamaicensis
- Sarcocystis jorrini
- Sarcocystis kinosterni
- Sarcocystis kirkpatricki
- Sarcocystis kirmsei
- Sarcocystis klaseriensis
- Sarcocystis kortei
- Sarcocystis lacertae
- Sarcocystis lamacanis
- Sarcocystis leporum
- Sarcocystis levinei
- Sarcocystis lindemanni
- Sarcocystis lindsayi
- Sarcocystis linearis
- Sarcocystis markusi
- Sarcocystis medusiformis
- Sarcocystis melis
- Sarcocystis mephitisi
- Sarcocystis miescheriana
- Sarcocystis mihoensis
- Sarcocystis mitrani
- Sarcocystis mongolica
- Sarcocystis montanaensis
- Sarcocystis morae
- Sarcocystis mucosa
- Sarcocystis moulei
- Sarcocystis murinotechis
- Sarcocystis muris
- Sarcocystis muriviperae
- Sarcocystis neotomafelis
- Sarcocystis nesbitti
- Sarcocystis neurona
- Sarcocystis odoi
- Sarcocystis odocoileocanis
- Sarcocystis ovicanis
- Sarcocystis ovifelis
- Sarcocystis oviformis
- Sarcocystis ovalis
- Sarcocystis phacochoeri
- Sarcocystis phoeniconaii
- Sarcocystis pilosa
- Sarcocystis podarcicolubris
- Sarcocystis poephagi
- Sarcocystis poephagicanis
- Sarcocystis porcifelis
- Sarcocystis porcihominis
- Sarcocystis rangi
- Sarcocystis rangiferi
- Sarcocystis rauschorum
- Sarcocystis rileyi
- Sarcocystis rodentifelis
- Sarcocystis roudabushi
- Sarcocystis scandinavica
- Sarcocystis sebeki
- Sarcocystis sibirica
- Sarcocystis sigmodontis
- Sarcocystis silva
- Sarcocystis singaporensis
- Sarcocystis speeri
- Sarcocystis stehlinii
- Sarcocystis stenodactylicolubris
- Sarcocystis strixi
- Sarcocystis suicanis
- Sarcocystis suihominis
- Sarcocystis sulawesiensis
- Sarcocystis sybillensis
- Sarcocystis tarandi
- Sarcocystis tarandivulpes
- Sarcocystis tenella
- Sarcocystis tilopodi
- Sarcocystis turcicii
- Sarcocystis turdi
- Sarcocystis ursusi
- Sarcocystis venatoria
- Sarcocystis villivilliso
- Sarcocystis wapiti
- Sarcocystis zamani

== Evolution ==
These protozoa are being increasingly well studied in mammals, birds and reptiles. They do not appear to infect mammals of the superorder Afrotheria and infect only two species of the Xenarthra. Because of this pattern, the genus may have evolved in the Northern Hemisphere from a pre-existing protozoan species that infected mammals. Alternatively, because a number of Australian marsupials are also infected by this genus, marsupials may have been the original hosts of this genus and the parasites were spread to the Northern Hemisphere by birds. A third possibility is that the genus originally infected birds and was spread worldwide by these hosts. A final possibility because of the existence of lifecycles where both the intermediate and final hosts are reptiles, the genus may have originated in reptiles and spread from there to other genera. The resolution of this question awaits the outcome of further molecular studies.

== Clinical: Human ==
Infection with Sarcocystis is known as sarcosporidiosis or sarcocystosis. Because of initial confusion over the nature of this parasite, the organism in the intestine was originally referred to as Isospora hominis .

=== Epidemiology ===
Although human intestinal infection is common, extraintestinal human sarcocystosis is considered to be rare.

The extremes of age reported to date are a 26-day-old infant and a 75-year-old man. Infections have been reported from Africa, Europe (Germany, Spain and Poland), the United States (California), Central and South America, China, India, Tibet, Malaysia, and Southeast Asia.

Stool examinations in Thai laborers showed that Sarcocystis infection had a high prevalence of around 23%, reflecting ingestion of raw or undercooked meat. Virtually all cases appeared to be asymptomatic. A study of 100 human tongues obtained post mortem in Malaya revealed an infection rate of 21%. No sex difference was found and the age range was 16 to 57 years (mean 37.7 years).

A non-enteric outbreak affecting 93 people was reported in 2012 in Malaysia. Sarcocystis nesbitti was confirmed to be the cause in several cases.

=== History ===
The first report of human infection was made in 1868. Although several additional reports were subsequently published, these early descriptions were not considered definitive. The first generally agreed definitive description of this disease was published in 1894 by Baraban and Saint-Remy. This species was named by Rivolta after Lindemannl in 1898.

The cysts in human muscle were considered to belong to a single species, S. lindemanni, and the intestinal form to be S. hominis (from undercooked beef) or S. suihominis (from undercooked pork). The description of S. lindemanni has since been considered to be unsatisfactory and has been declared a nomen nudum (a name lacking a description). Two species are currently considered to be capable of causing human intestinal infection: S. bovihominis (S. hominis) and S. suihominis. Other species including S. nesbitti have occasionally been reported as infecting humans extraintestinally.

=== Events occurring within animals ===
Between the years 1992 and 1996, an investigation was conducted where 605 sheep, 826 goats, 1080 cattle, 580 water buffaloes and 36 camels had been slaughtered. The event happened in the Baghdad area in Iraq, the research used naked eye examination for macroscopic Sarcocysts, and peptic digestion, muscle squash, squeezing methods and indirect fluorescent antibody tests for microscopic types. Dogs had also been used in the trials as well when they had consumed cysts containing the infectious parasite or any other microscopic lifeform.

The prevalence of these parasitic lifeforms including Sarcocysts(Sarcocystis) was as follows from the results, the macroscopic cysts were 4.1, 33.6, 0.2, 15.6 and 0, and of the microscopic type, 97.0, 97.4, 97.8, 82.9 and 91.6 for the above-mentioned hosts. The most effective method was peptic digestion, giving a 93.3% rate, fluorescent antibody test (IFAT) (88.6%), squeezing (81.3%), and muscle squash (81.2%). And as for the dogs, each one had shed about a total of 150-120 million sporocysts.

=== Route of infection ===
Intestinal infection occurs when raw or undercooked meat is ingested. Contaminated water might be a source of very rare human extraintestinal infection (it is not possible for water to be the origin of a gut infection), but this remains a theoretical possibility. Fecal matter is also another way of transportation from one host to another for the parasitic lifeform.

=== Pathology ===
The pathology is of two types: a rare invasive form with vasculitis and myositis and an intestinal form that presents with nausea, abdominal pain, and diarrhea. While normally mild and lasting under 48 hours, the intestinal form may occasionally be severe or even life-threatening. The invasive form may involve a wide variety of tissues including lymph nodes, muscles, and the larynx.

=== Clinical features ===
In volunteer studies with infected beef, symptoms appeared 3–6 hours after eating. These included anorexia, nausea, abdominal pain, distension, diarrhea, vomiting, dyspnea, and tachycardia. All symptoms were transient and lasted about 36 hours. In a second series, symptoms—abdominal pain, distension, watery diarrhea, and eosinophilia—appeared at 1 week and resolved after 3 weeks.

Clinical cases have been associated with acute fever, myalgias, bronchospasm, pruritic rashes, lymphadenopathy, subcutaneous nodules associated with eosinophilia, elevated erythrocyte sedimentation rate, and elevated creatinine kinase levels. Symptoms may last as long as five years. Segmental necrotizing enteritis has been reported on one occasion.

=== Diagnosis ===
Definitive diagnosis by biopsy of an infected muscle. Sarcocysts are identifiable with hematoxylin and eosin. The PAS stain may be helpful, but variable uptake of stain is common. Along with the sarcocysts, inflammatory cells may be found. Other findings include myositis, myonecrosis, perivascular and interstitial inflammation, vasculitis, and eosinophilic myositis.

=== Prevention ===
Infection can be prevented by cooking the meat before eating. Alternatively, freezing the meat at −5 °C for several days before ingestion kills the sporocysts.

== Clinical: Nonhuman ==
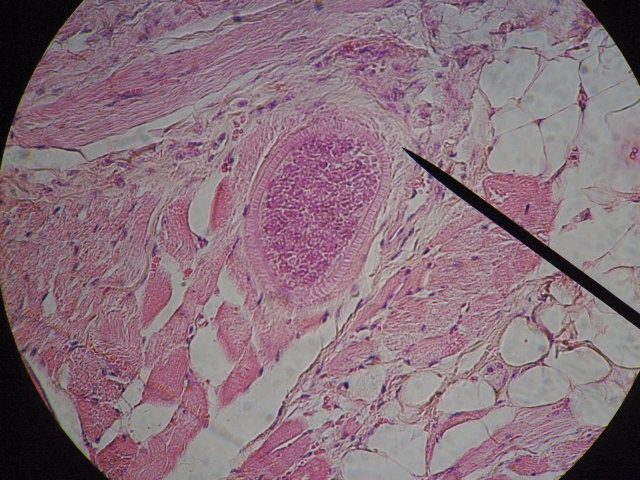
Sarcocysts within pig skeletal muscle: Note the readily visible striated border.

Four recognised species infect cattle: S. bovifelis, S. bovihominis (S. hominis), S. cruzi (S. bovicanis), and S. hirsuta. S. cruzi is the only species known to be pathogenic in cattle. Several clinical syndromes have been reported in connection with this parasite: eosinophilic myositis; abortions, stillbirths, and deaths in pregnant cows; two cases of necrotic encephalitis in heifers have also been reported. Typical clinical signs of acute bovine sarcocystosis are: anorexia, pyrexia (42 °C or more), anemia, cachexia, enlarged palpable lymph nodes, excessive salivation, and loss of hair at the tip of the tail.

Sheep may be infected by four recognized species of Sarcocystis: S. arieticanis and S. tenella (S. ovicanis) are pathogenic; S. gigantea (S. ovifelis) and S. medusiformis are nonpathogenic. Infection with these parasites is common in the US with over 80% of sheep examined showing evidence of infection. S. arieticanis and S. tenella both produce extraintestinal disease. Anemia, anorexia, ataxia, and abortions are the chief clinical signs. Myositis with flaccid paralysis has been reported as a consequence of infection. Ovine protozoan myeloencephalitis is a recognised syndrome that may occur in outbreaks. The usual pathological findings in such cases are multifocal spinal cord white matter oedema and necrosis, glial nodules and mild to moderate nonsuppurative encephalomyelitis. The diagnosis may be established finding protozoan bodies (12.7–23.0 μm) that stain immunocytochemically for Sarcocystis epitopes.

Four recognised species infect pigs: S. medusiformis, S. meischeriana (S. suicanis), S. porcifelis, and S. suihominis. S. porcifelis is pathogenic for pigs causing diarrhea, myositis and lameness.

Five species infect horses: S. asinus, S. bertrami, S. equicanis, S. fayeri, and S. neurona (S. falcatula). All use canids as definitive hosts; transplacental infection has also been reported. S. neurona causes equine protozoal myeloencephalitis. Exposure to this parasite appears to be common in the United States, with serological surveys indicating that 50–60% percent of all horses in the Midwest United States have been exposed to it. Clinical signs include gait abnormalities including ataxia, knuckling, and crossing over. Muscle atrophy, usually unilateral, may occur. The lesions are typically focal. Brain stem involvement is common. Depression, weakness, head tilt, and dysphagia also occur. S. fayeri may cause myositis in horses.

Fatal infection of an alpaca (Lama pacos) with an unnamed species has been reported. Findings included disseminated eosinophilic myositis, abortion, and haemoabdomen. The myositis was associated with haemorrhage, necrosis, and degeneration. Infection by S. tilopodi of muscle tissue in the guanaco has been reported.

S. hemionilatrantis infects mule deer. Death from experimental inoculation has been reported.

These parasites can also infect birds, producing three different clinical forms: an acute pulmonary disease, muscular disease, and neurological disease. Symptoms include lethargy, shortness of breath, tail bobbing, yellow-tinted droppings, and sudden death. The presence of the cysts in the muscle of wild birds is known as "rice breast".

== Incidence in animals ==
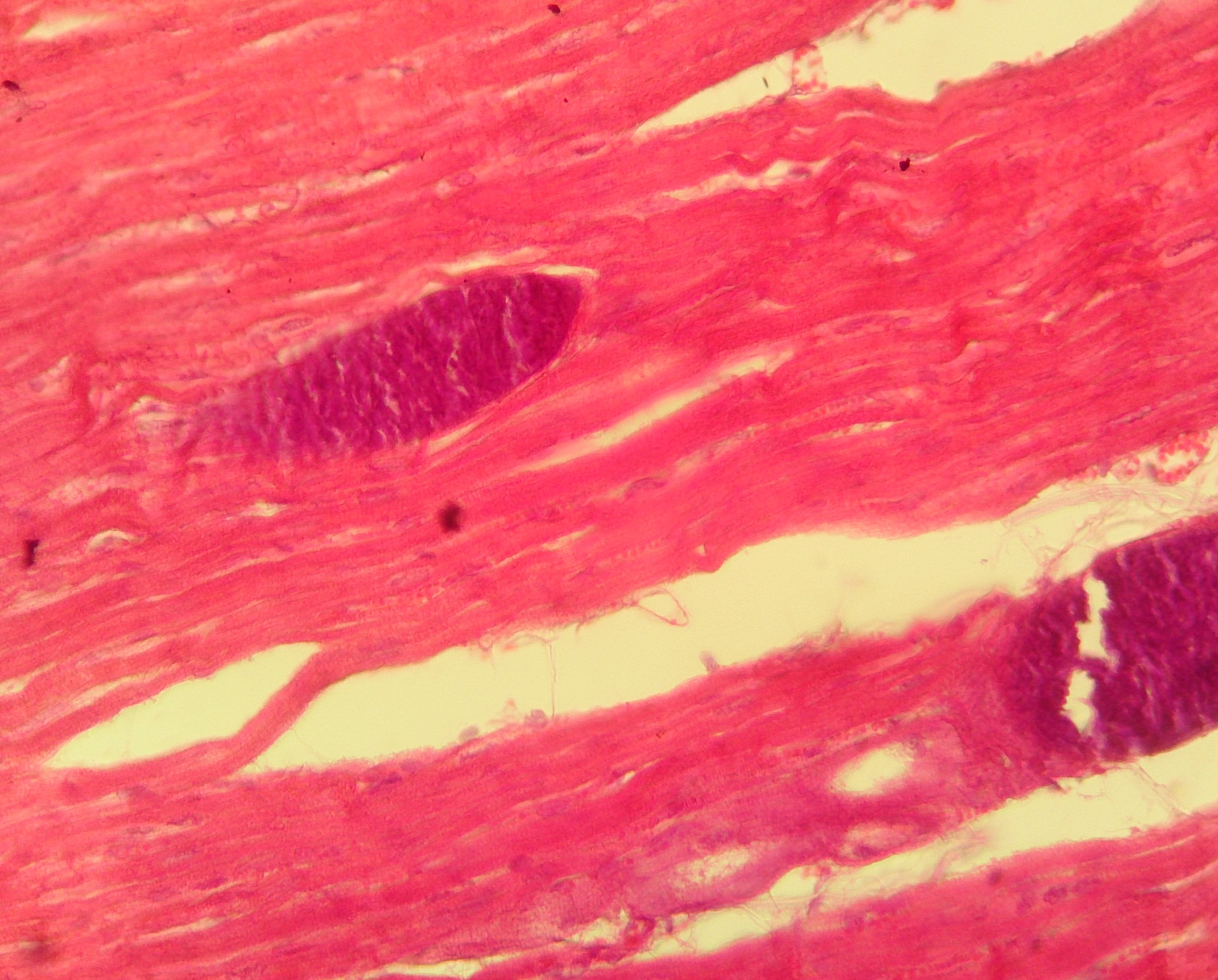
H&E micrograph showing Sarcocystis in a 3-year-old sheep cardiac muscle tissue (40X)

Infection with Sarcocystis is common. Rates in pigs vary: 18% in Iowa, 27% in the Philippines, 43% in Spain, 57% in Uruguay, and 68% in India The infection rate in sheep is commonly above 90%. Camels have a similarly high incidence of infection. Rates above 80% are known in cattle and goats. The incidence in water buffaloes, yak and hainag exceeds 80% while the incidence in horses, donkeys, and chickens is lower.

== Diagnosis ==
The diagnosis is usually made post mortem by examination of the skeletal muscle. In some species, the cysts may be visible to the naked eye (ducks, mice, rabbits and sheep), but in most, microscopic examination is required.

Ante mortem diagnosis may be made with the use of dermal sensitivity testing or complement fixation tests. Muscle biopsy is also diagnostic, but this is much less commonly used.

=== Microscopy ===
Oocysts with two sporocysts or individual sporocysts in human feces are diagnostic of intestinal infection. These first appear 14 to 18 days after ingesting beef (S. hominis), and 11 to 13 days after ingesting pork (S. suihominis). Flotation based on high-density solutions incorporating sodium chloride, cesium chloride, zinc sulfate, sucrose, Percoll, Ficoll-Hypaque, or other such density gradient media is preferred to formalin-ethyl acetate or other sedimentation methods. Sporocysts of S. hominis average 9.3 by 14.7 μm and those of S. suihominis average 10.5 by 13.5 μm. Because of the overlap in size, size alone is not reliable as a diagnostic criterion of the species. Confirmatory staining with the periodic acid-Schiff (PAS) can be performed, as the walls stain positively. Heated safranin + methylene blue has been used for staining, as well. PCR amplification of the rRNA may also be used.

=== Cell walls ===
The walls of the sarcocyst may be helpful in species diagnosis with 24 wall types identified in 62 species. S. hominis and S. suihominis both have walls of type 10. The wall of S. hominis is up to 6 μm thick and appears radially striated from villar protrusions up to 7 μm long. Its bradyzoites are 7 to 9 μm long. The wall of S. suihominis is 4 to 9μm thick, with villar protrusions up to 13 μm long. Its bradyzoites are 15 μm long.

=== Differential diagnosis ===
Several other genera of heteroxenous and cyst-forming coccidia are known, including Besnoitia, Cystoisospora, Frenkelia, Hammondia, Neospora and Toxoplasma. Related but monoxenous spore-forming genera include Isospora. Differentiating these genera from Sarcocystis in diagnostic material may be difficult without immunochemical stains.

== Treatment ==
Current treatments are not entirely satisfactory. Amprolium (100 mg/kg, daily for 30 days), fed prophylactically, reduced illness in cattle inoculated with S. cruzi. Prophylactic administration of amprolium or salinomycin also protected experimentally infected sheep.

In horses, treatment has been confined to dihydrofolate reductase inhibitors such as the sulfonamides and pyrimethamine. Sulfadiazine (20 mg/kg orally) once or twice a day is a commonly used. Infected horses should also be placed on pyrimethamine at the dose of 1.0 mg/kg given once a day orally for 120 days or longer. Diclazuril and toltrazuril and other coccidiostats are being evaluated to treat EPM.

Since infection is rarely symptomatic, treatment is rarely required. No trials have been published, so treatment remains empirical. Amprolium and salinomycin were effective in preventing severe illness and death in experimentally infected calves and lambs. These agents have not been tried in humans to date.

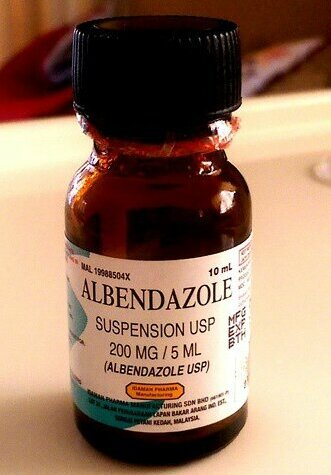
Used to treat neurocysticercosis, an infection of the nervous system caused by pork tapeworms.

Muscle Sarcocystis is a parasitic infection causing muscle inflammation, pain, and weakness. Diagnosis is difficult and may require a biopsy. Albendazole has been effective in some cases. Albendazole is a medication used to treat parasitic infections by disrupting the parasites' ability to absorb nutrients, leading to their elimination. It is effective against infections caused by worms and some protozoa, including conditions like tapeworms, roundworms, and muscle Sarcocystis.

While Albendazole has been used to deter Sarcocystis, it is not a definitive cure, often used with combinations of other medicines such as prednisone, cotrimoxazole, and methotrexate.

== Vaccination ==
No vaccines are currently known. Experimentally inoculated pigs appear to develop a persistent immunity, so a vaccine may be possible.

== Host-parasite relations ==
The parasite's lifecycle typically involves a predator and a prey animal. A single species may infect multiple prey or predator animals. In at least 56 species, definitive and intermediate hosts are known. Many species are named after their recognised hosts.

A listing of the known host-parasite relations can be found on the page Sarcocystis: Host-parasite relations.

== Notes ==
Hoareosporidium is now considered a synonym of Sarcocystis. The original type species was Sarcocystis miescheriana. Its description has since been considered less than satisfactory and S. muris has been proposed as the type species. S. turdi may not be a valid species.

Isospora bigemina has been reclassified as Sarcocystis bigemina. Isospora hominis has been reclassified as Sarcocystis hominis. S. bovihominis is a synonym of S. hominis. S. cruzi is a synonym of S. bovicanis. S. gigantea is a synonym of S. ovifelis. S. hirsuta is a synonym of S. bovifelis. S. idahoensis and S. roudabushi may be the same species. S. miescheriana is a synonym of S. suicanis. S. neurona is a junior synonym of S. falcatula. S. neuroma is the more commonly used name for this species. S. poephagi may be the same species as S. hirsuta. S. poephagicanis may be the same species as S. cruzi. S. tenella is a synonym of S. ovicanis.

== See also ==
- Equine protozoal myeloencephalitis
