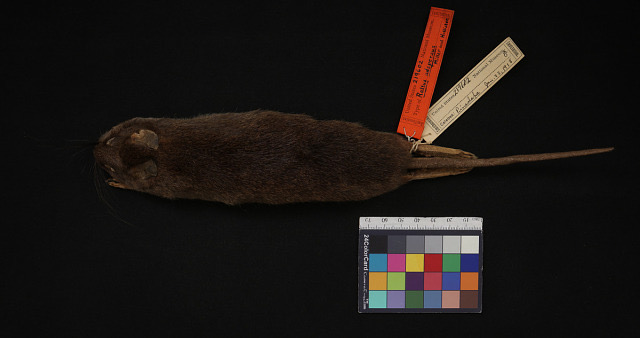

Conservation status
- Least Concern (IUCN 3.1)

Scientific classification
- Kingdom: Animalia
- Phylum: Chordata
- Class: Mammalia
- Order: Rodentia
- Family: Muridae
- Genus: Bunomys
- Species: B. andrewsi

Binomial name
- Bunomys andrewsi (J. A. Allen, 1911)

Synonyms
- Bunomys heinrichi (Tate & Archbold, 1935)

= Andrew's hill rat =

Species of rodent

Andrew's hill rat (Bunomys andrewsi) is a species of rodent in the family Muridae. It is found only in Sulawesi and Buton Island, Indonesia.
