= Bunomys =

Scientific classification
- Domain: Eukaryota
- Kingdom: Animalia
- Phylum: Chordata
- Class: Mammalia
- Order: Rodentia
- Family: Muridae
- Tribe: Rattini
- Genus: Bunomys; Thomas, 1910

Type species
- Mus coelesti

Species
- Bunomys andrewsi Bunomys chrysocomus Bunomys coelestis Bunomys fratrorum Bunomys karokophilus Bunomys penitus Bunomys prolatus Bunomys torajae

Genus of rodents

Bunomys is a genus of rodent from Sulawesi and Buton Island.

Currently, eight species are recognised in two species-groups.

== Species ==
Genus Bunomys
chrysocomus-group:

- Yellow-haired hill rat, Bunomys chrysocomus Hoffmann, 1887
- Heavenly hill rat, Bunomys coelestis Thomas, 1896
- Long-headed hill rat, Bunomys prolatus Musser, 1991
- Tana Toraja hill rat, Bunomys torajae Musser, 2014

fratrorum-group:

- Fraternal hill rat, Bunomys fratrorum Thomas, 1896
- Andrew's hill rat, Bunomys andrewsi J. A. Allen, 1911
- Karoko hill rat, Bunomys karokophilus Musser, 2014
- Inland hill rat, Bunomys penitus Miller and Hollister, 1921
