= Karoko hill rat =

Conservation status
- Data Deficient (IUCN 3.1)

Scientific classification
- Kingdom: Animalia
- Phylum: Chordata
- Class: Mammalia
- Order: Rodentia
- Family: Muridae
- Genus: Bunomys
- Species: B. karokophilus

Binomial name
- Bunomys karokophilus Musser, 2014

Species of rodent

The Karoko hill rat (Bunomys karokophilus) is a species of rodent in the family Muridae. It is found only in Sulawesi, Indonesia.
