= Heavenly hill rat =

Conservation status
- Endangered (IUCN 3.1)

Scientific classification
- Kingdom: Animalia
- Phylum: Chordata
- Class: Mammalia
- Infraclass: Placentalia
- Order: Rodentia
- Family: Muridae
- Genus: Bunomys
- Species: B. coelestis

Binomial name
- Bunomys coelestis (Thomas, 1896)
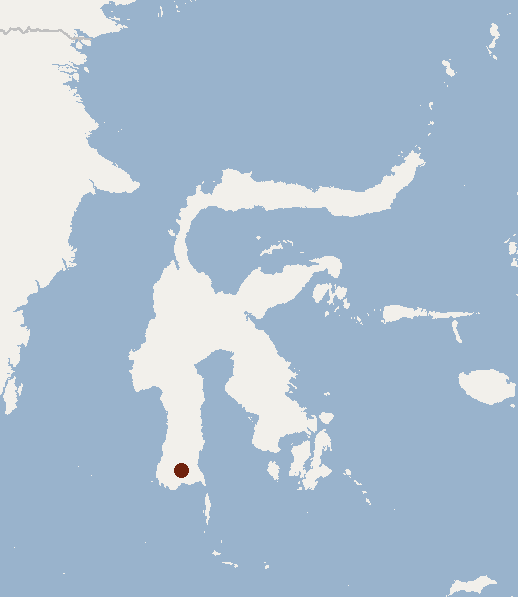

Species of rodent

The heavenly hill rat (Bunomys coelestis) is a species of rodent in the family Muridae. It is found only in southwestern Sulawesi, Indonesia, where it has only been found on Mount Lompobatang. Its natural habitat is subtropical or tropical dry forest. It is threatened by habitat loss.
