= Inland hill rat =

Conservation status
- Least Concern (IUCN 3.1)

Scientific classification
- Kingdom: Animalia
- Phylum: Chordata
- Class: Mammalia
- Order: Rodentia
- Family: Muridae
- Genus: Bunomys
- Species: B. penitus

Binomial name
- Bunomys penitus (Miller & Hollister, 1921)
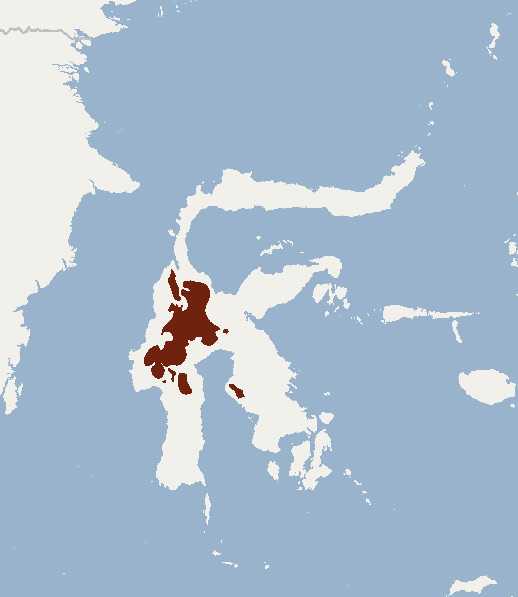
- Distribution of Bunomys penitus

Species of rodent

The inland hill rat (Bunomys penitus) is a species of rodent in the family Muridae. It is found only in central and southern Sulawesi, Indonesia.
