= Long-headed hill rat =

Conservation status
- Endangered (IUCN 3.1)

Scientific classification
- Kingdom: Animalia
- Phylum: Chordata
- Class: Mammalia
- Order: Rodentia
- Family: Muridae
- Genus: Bunomys
- Species: B. prolatus

Binomial name
- Bunomys prolatus Musser, 1991

Species of rodent

The long-headed hill rat (Bunomys prolatus) is a species of rodent in the family Muridae. It is found only in Sulawesi, Indonesia, where it is only known from Mount Tambusisi. Its natural habitat is subtropical or tropical dry forests. It is threatened by habitat loss.
