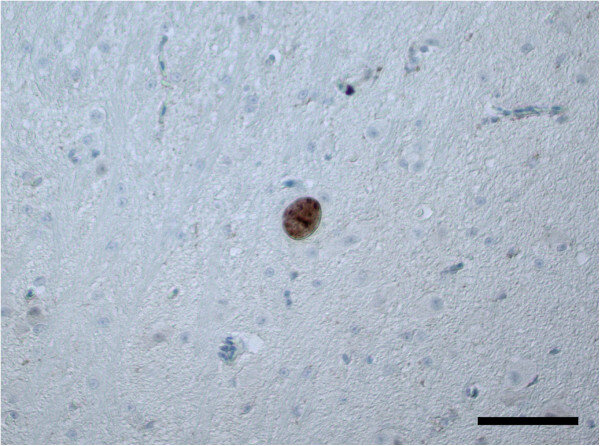
- Cyst from the brain of a pigeon infected by S. calchasi

Scientific classification
- Domain: Eukaryota
- Clade: Sar
- Superphylum: Alveolata
- Phylum: Apicomplexa
- Class: Conoidasida
- Order: Eucoccidiorida
- Family: Sarcocystidae
- Genus: Sarcocystis
- Species: S. calchasi

Binomial name
- Sarcocystis calchasi Olias, Gruber, Hafez, Heydorn, Mehlhorn & Lierz 2010

= Sarcocystis calchasi =

Species of single-celled organism

Sarcocystis calchasi is an apicomplexan parasite. It has been identified to be the cause of Pigeon protozoal encephalitis (PPE) in the intermediate hosts, domestic pigeons (Columba livia). PPE is a central-nervous disease of domestic pigeons. Initially there have been reports of this parasite in Germany, with an outbreak in 2008 and in 2011 in the United States. Sarcocystis calchasi is transmitted by the definitive host Accipter hawks.

== Pigeon protozoal encephalitis ==
Pigeons infected with S. calchasi show a biphasic disease with polyuria, diarrhea and apathy. In the later periods of infection, severe central nervous signs such as torticollis and opisthotonus associated with severe brain lesions have been observed. Mature tissue cysts were observed in skeletal muscles in the post infection stage. Encephalitis has been reported to be associated with the schizont stage of the parasite's development.

== In the USA ==
In 2011, domestic pigeons in Minnesota, USA were observed with a neurological disease. Tissue cysts of a protozoan parasite were present in the skeletal muscle. The pigeons had severe granulomatous meningoencephalitis. The cysts morphology was observed to be slender, up to 1 mm long and up to 0.03 mm in diameter. The cysts had a smooth wall without projections. It was concluded that the size and wall morphology observed in the pigeons in Minnesota were compatible with Sarcocystis calchasi.

== Thesis ==
- Aleksandra Zuraw: Is There Evidence of Sarcocystis Calchasi Involvement in Meningoencephalitis of Unknown Origin in Mammals? A Retrospective Study, Mensch und Buch, Berlin 2016, ISBN 978-3-86387-684-5 (Thesis/Dissertation Freie Universität Berlin 2015, Inhaltsverzeichnis).
