= Sarcocystis nesbitti =

Scientific classification
- Domain: Eukaryota
- Supergroup: Alveolata
- Phylum: Apicomplexa
- Class: Conoidasida
- Order: Eucoccidiorida
- Family: Sarcocystidae
- Genus: Sarcocystis
- Species: S. nesbitti

Binomial name
- Sarcocystis nesbitti Mandour, 1969

Species of single-celled organism

Sarcocystis nesbitti is a species of Apicomplexa parasite.

== Human infection ==
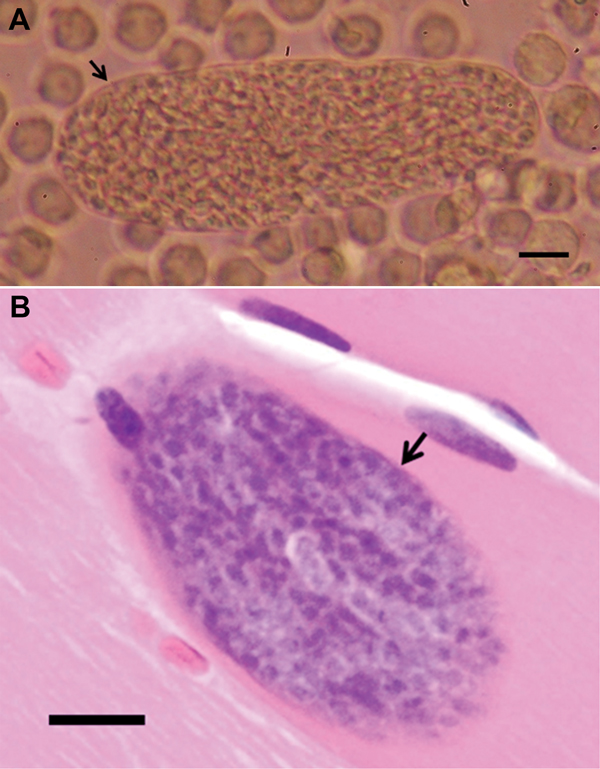
Sarcocysts isolated from persons infected with Sarcocystis nesbitti, Pangkor Island, Malaysia, 2012. A- Intact human sarcocyst (length 190 μm) with thin cyst wall (arrow) from homogenized temporalis tissue inoculated into a U937 monocytic cell culture (original magnification ×200, scale bar = 20 μm). B- Intramuscular sarcocyst enclosed by a thin smooth cyst wall (arrow) without any protrusions. Maximum cyst wall thickness is about 0.5 μm (hematoxylin and eosin stained, original magnification ×40, scale bar = 10 μm).

An outbreak investigation was conducted on 93 symptomatic persons from Malaysia following a college retreat on January 17–19, 2012, on Pangkor Island. Predominant manifestations were fever (relapsing in about 50% of patients), myalgia, headache, and cough. Although only two patients were confirmed to be acutely infected with S. nesbitti, the remaining students and teachers in the group likely had the same infection, because nearly all had similar signs and symptoms with onset of illness within days of each other. In addition, 9 patients had a distinctive facial myositis, but sarcocysts could not be verified in all of them because only three patients agreed to provide a muscle biopsy specimen.

== History of discovery ==
In 1843, Swiss scientist Friedrich Miescher found “milky white threads” in the muscles of a mouse, which for years were known as “Miescher’s tubules”. In 1882, Lankester named the parasite Sarcocystis, from the Greek sarx (flesh) and kystis (bladder). Scientists were unsure whether to classify the organisms as protozoa or as fungi because only the sarcocyst stage had been identified. In 1967, crescent-shaped structures typical of some parasitic protozoa were seen in sarcocyst cultures, and the organism was determined to be a protozoan, a close relative of Toxoplasma. In the early 1970s, the two-host lifecycle of Sarcocystis was actually elucidated. In 1969, A. M. Mandour described a new species of Sarcocystis in rhesus macaques, which he named Sarcocystis nesbitti, after Mr. P. Nesbitt, who saw the trophozoites in stained smears. Snakes are now known to be the definitive hosts of S. nesbitti, and several primates, including humans, can be intermediate hosts.
