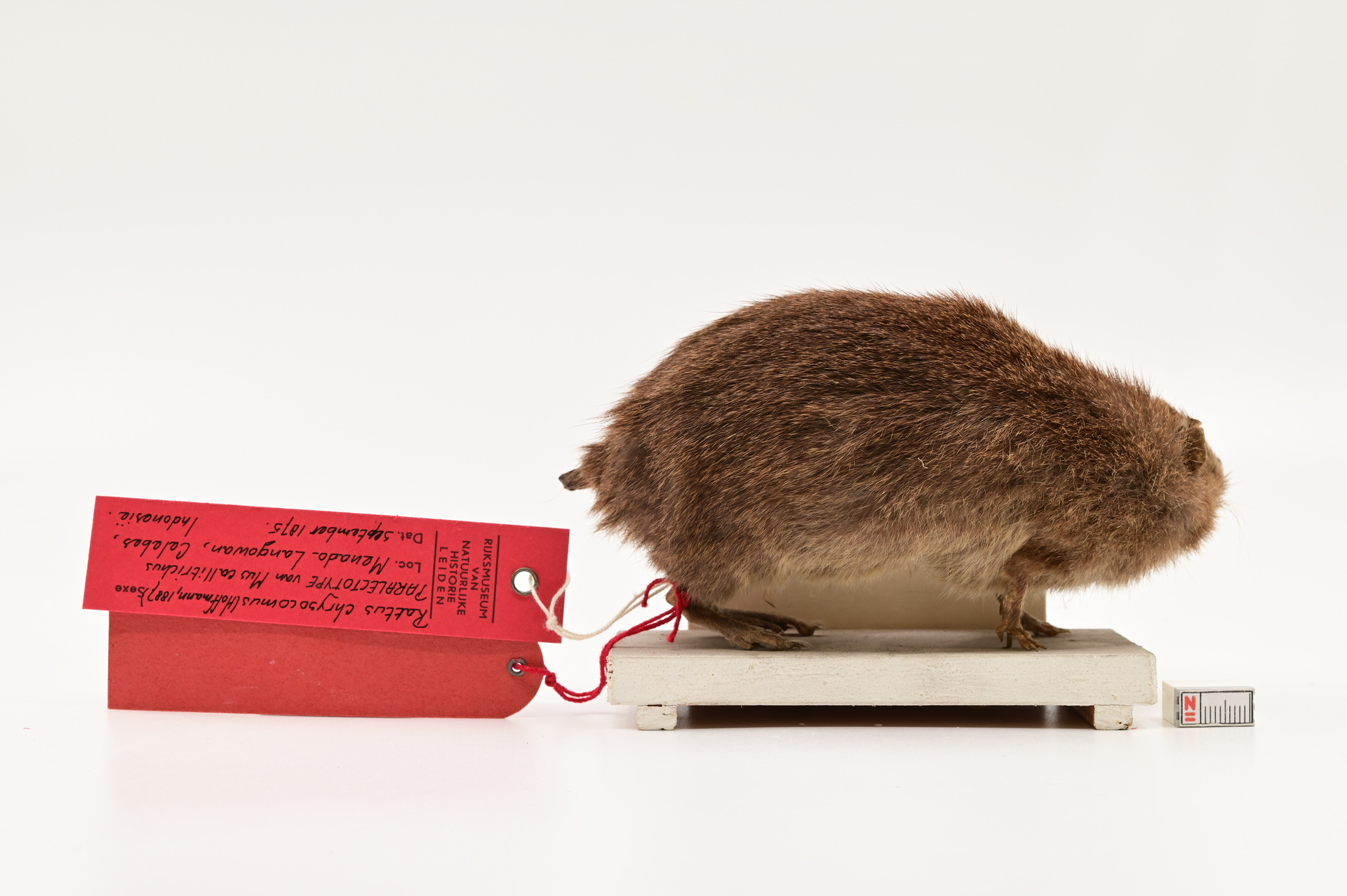

Conservation status
- Least Concern (IUCN 3.1)

Scientific classification
- Kingdom: Animalia
- Phylum: Chordata
- Class: Mammalia
- Order: Rodentia
- Family: Muridae
- Genus: Bunomys
- Species: B. chrysocomus

Binomial name
- Bunomys chrysocomus (Hoffmann, 1887)

= Yellow-haired hill rat =

Species of rodent

The yellow-haired hill rat (Bunomys chrysocomus) is a species of rodent in the family Muridae. It is found only in Sulawesi, Indonesia, including Lore Lindu National Park.
