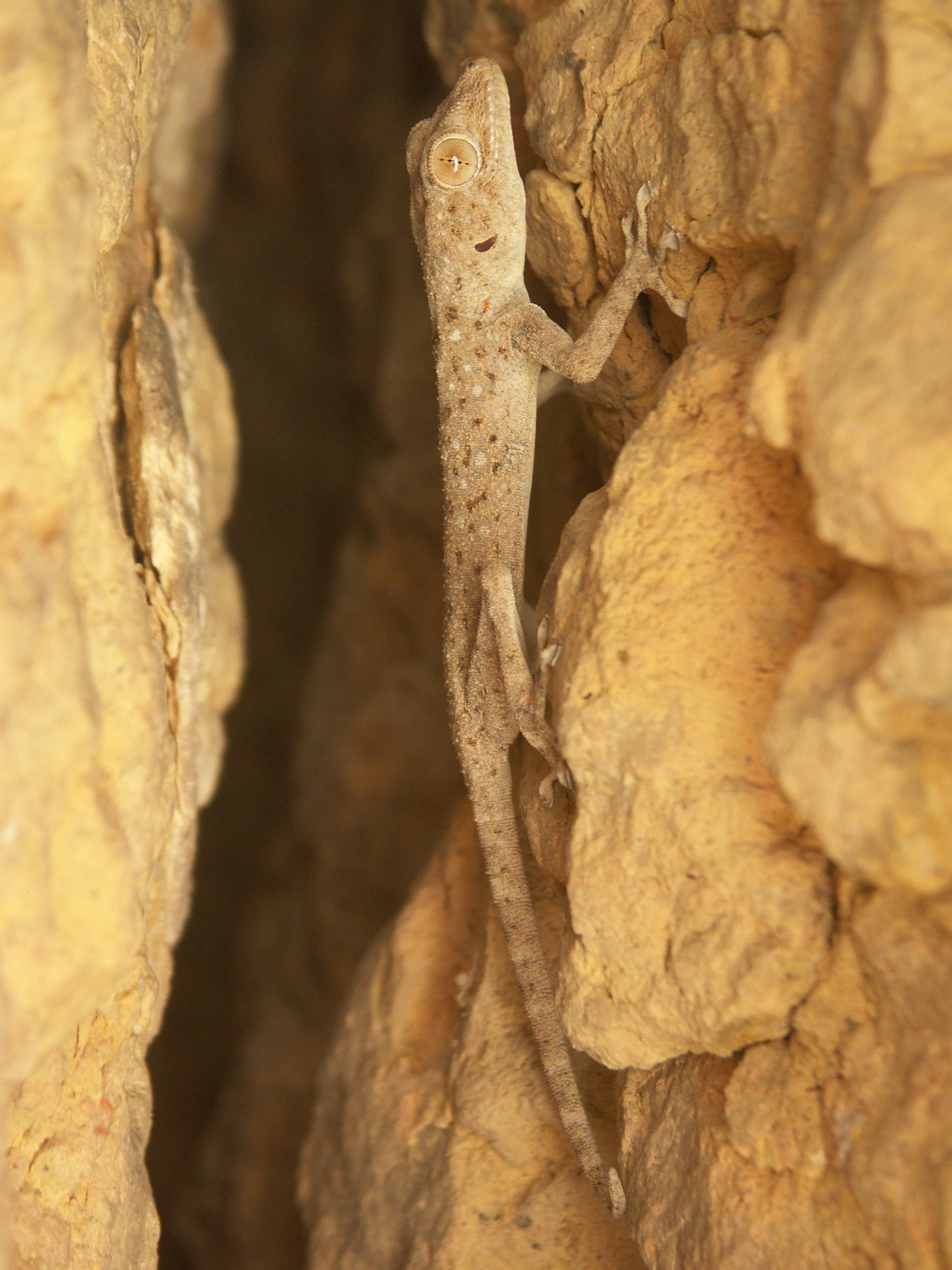

Conservation status
- Least Concern (IUCN 3.1)

Scientific classification
- Kingdom: Animalia
- Phylum: Chordata
- Class: Reptilia
- Order: Squamata
- Suborder: Gekkota
- Family: Phyllodactylidae
- Genus: Ptyodactylus
- Species: P. guttatus

Binomial name
- Ptyodactylus guttatus Heyden, 1827

= Sinai fan-fingered gecko =

Species of lizard

The Sinai fan-fingered gecko (Ptyodactylus guttatus) is a species of gecko. It is found in Egypt in, Israel and the Middle East. It is common in the Sinai desert and the Negev desert. Its fan shaped fingers have given it the name מניפנית in Hebrew coming from the word מניפה which means "fan"
