= Sarcocystis accipitris =

Scientific classification
- Domain: Eukaryota
- Clade: Sar
- Superphylum: Alveolata
- Phylum: Apicomplexa
- Class: Conoidasida
- Order: Eucoccidiorida
- Family: Sarcocystidae
- Genus: Sarcocystis
- Species: S. accipitris

Binomial name
- Sarcocystis accipitris Cern & Kvasnovsk, 1986

Species of single-celled organism

Sarcocystis accipitris is a species of parasites of the genus Sarcocystis.

== Description ==
This species was described by Cern and Kvasnovsk in 1986.

The sarcocysts measure 15 to 17 by 13 to 15 micrometres in diameter.

== Clinical features and host pathology ==
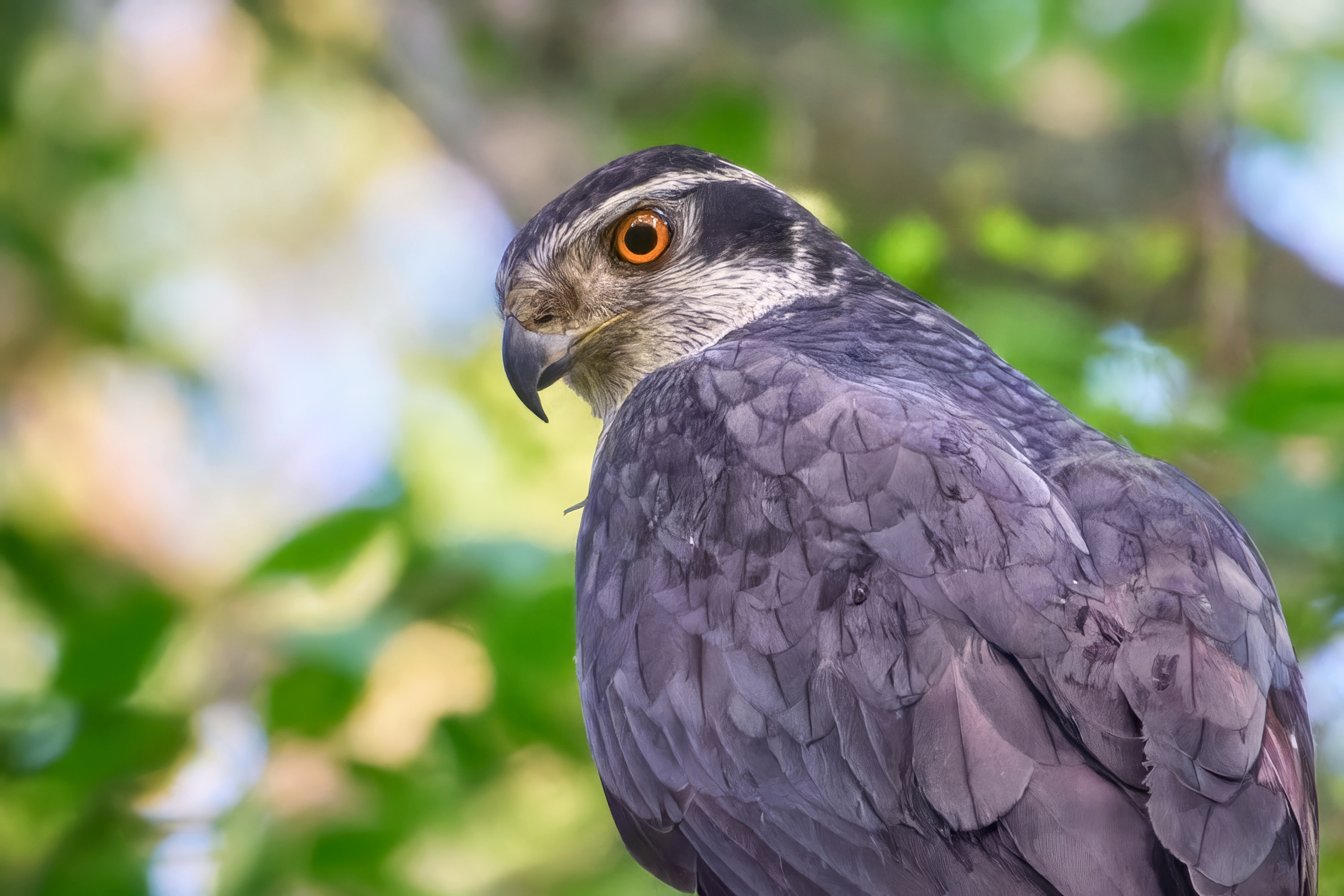
Eurasian goshawk (Accipiter gentilis) - host of S. accipitris

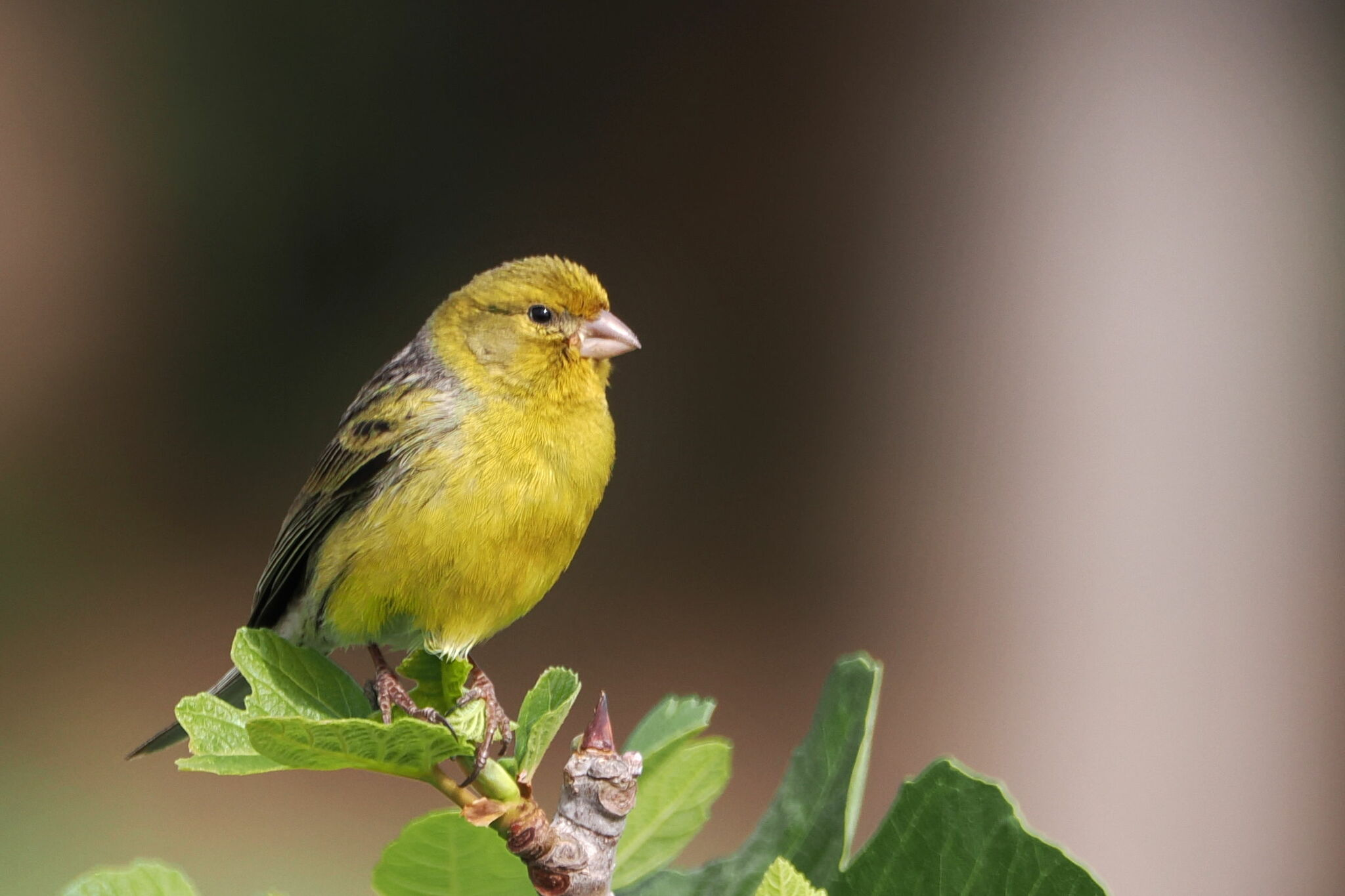
Atlantic canary (Serinus canaria) - intermediate host of S. accipitris

The only known hosts of this species are the Eurasian goshawk (Accipiter gentilis) - the definitive host - and the canary (Serinus canaria) - the intermediate host.
