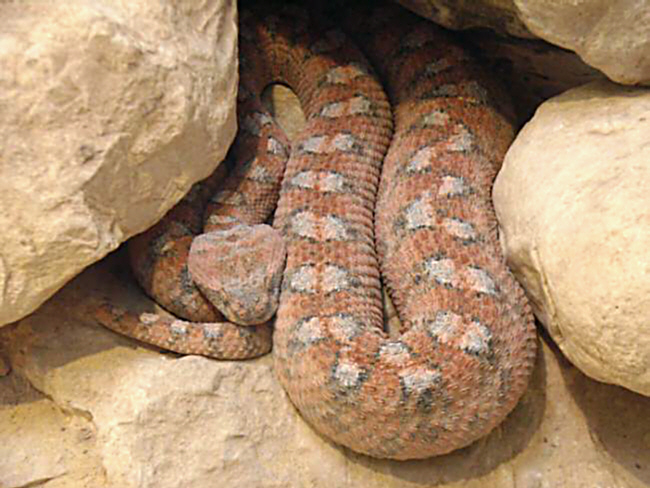

Conservation status
- Least Concern (IUCN 3.1)

Scientific classification
- Kingdom: Animalia
- Phylum: Chordata
- Class: Reptilia
- Order: Squamata
- Suborder: Serpentes
- Family: Viperidae
- Genus: Echis
- Species: E. coloratus

Binomial name
- Echis coloratus Günther, 1878

Synonyms
- Echis froenata A.M.C. Duméril, Bibron & A.H.A. Duméril, 1854; E[chis]. carinata var. frenata — Jan, 1863; Echis colorata Günther, 1878; Echis frenata — Pfeffer, 1893; Echis coloratus — Boulenger, 1896; Echis coloratus coloratus — Cherlin, 1983; Echis [(Turanechis)] froenatus — Cherlin, 1990

= Echis coloratus =

Species of reptile

Echis coloratus, known as the painted saw-scaled viper, painted carpet viper, Burton's carpet viper, and by other common names, is a highly venomous viper species endemic to the Middle East and Egypt. No subspecies are currently recognized.

== Description ==
It grows to a maximum total length (body + tail) of 75 cm (30 in).

== Common names ==
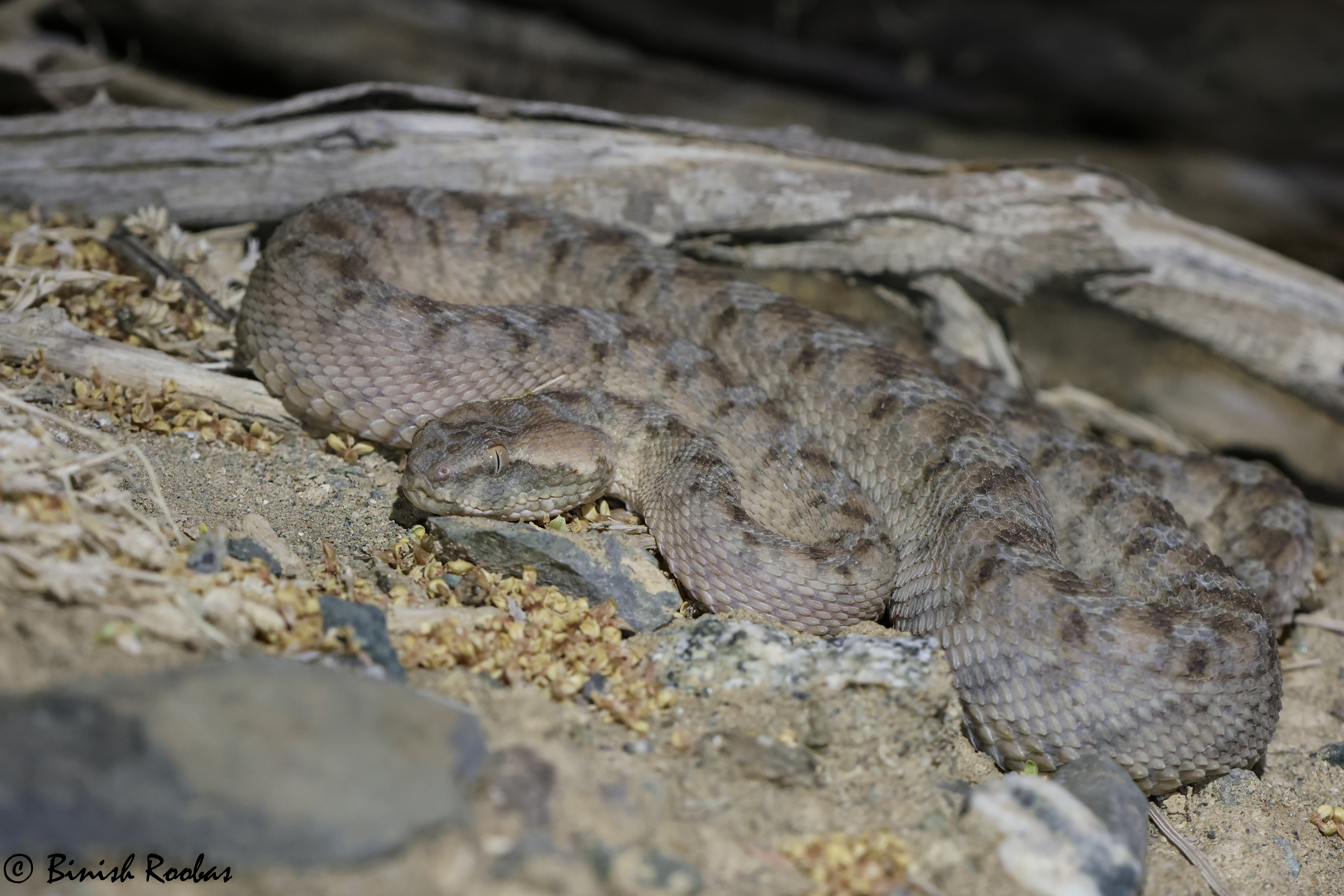
Echis coloratus from Saudi Arabia

Painted saw-scaled viper, painted carpet viper, Burton's carpet viper, Palestine saw-scaled viper, Arabian saw-scaled viper, Mid-East saw-scaled viper.

== Geographic range ==
It is found in the Middle East and North Africa. It occurs in Egypt east of the Nile from near the southern border to the Sinai Peninsula, and its range extends eastwards into the Negev in Israel, Palestine's West Bank region, and Jordan. On the adjoining Arabian Peninsula it has been recorded in Western Saudi Arabia, Yemen, and Southern Oman.

The type locality given is "on Jebel Shárr, at an altitude of 4500 feet ... Midian" (Saudi Arabia, 1371 m altitude).

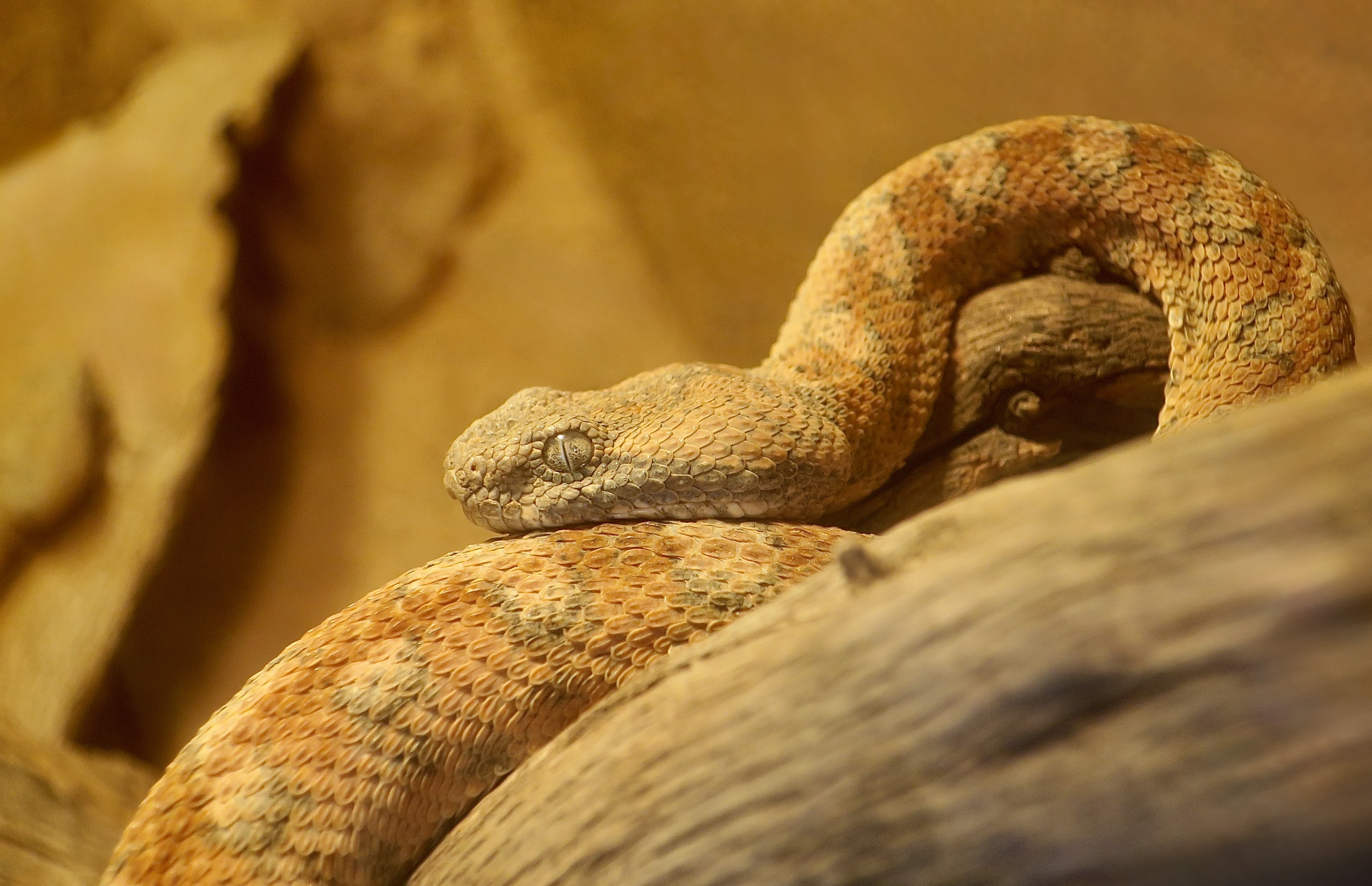
Closeup of a painted saw-scaled viper at Phoenix Zoo.

== Habitat ==
It occurs in rocky deserts, from sea level to altitudes as high as 2,500 m (8,200 ft). It is not found in sandy deserts.

== Taxonomy ==
In order to maintain nomenclatural stability, Stimson (1974) proposed that E. coloratus be validated over E. froenata. The ICZN subsequently gave coloratus precedence over froenata by use of its plenary powers.
