= Stenodactylus grandiceps =

Conservation status
- Least Concern (IUCN 3.1)

Scientific classification
- Kingdom: Animalia
- Phylum: Chordata
- Class: Reptilia
- Order: Squamata
- Suborder: Gekkota
- Family: Gekkonidae
- Genus: Stenodactylus
- Species: S. grandiceps

Binomial name
- Stenodactylus grandiceps Haas, 1952

Species of lizard

Stenodactylus grandiceps, also known as the Jordan short-fingered gecko or stout gecko, is a species of lizard in the family Gekkonidae. The species is found in the Middle East.
