= Fraternal hill rat =

Fraternal Hill rat

Conservation status
- Vulnerable (IUCN 3.1)

Scientific classification
- Kingdom: Animalia
- Phylum: Chordata
- Class: Mammalia
- Order: Rodentia
- Family: Muridae
- Genus: Frateromys
- Species: F. fratrorum

Binomial name
- Frateromys fratrorum (Thomas, 1896)

Species of rodent

The fraternal hill rat (Frateromys fratrorum) is a species of rodent in the family Muridae. It is the only member of the genus Frateromys. It is found only in northeastern Sulawesi, Indonesia. Its natural habitat is tropical dry forest. It is threatened by habitat loss.
