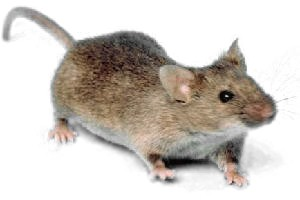
- Mus musculus, the house mouse

Scientific classification
- Kingdom: Animalia
- Phylum: Chordata
- Class: Mammalia
- Order: Rodentia
- Family: Muridae
- Subfamily: Murinae; Illiger, 1811

Genera
- Abditomys; Abeomelomys; Aethomys; Anisomys; Anonymomys †Antemus †Anthracomys; Apodemus; Apomys; Archboldomys; Arvicanthis; Baiyankamys; Bandicota; Batomys †Beremendimys; Berylmys; Bullimus; Bunomys †Canariomys; Carpomys †Castillomys †Castromys †Chardinomys; Chingawaemys; Chiromyscus; Chiropodomys; Chiruromys; Chrotomys; Coccymys; Colomys; Congomys; Conilurus †Coryphomys; Crateromys; Crossomys; Cremnomys; Crunomys; Dacnomys; Dasymys; Dephomys; Desmomys †Dilatomys; Diomys; Diplothrix; Echiothrix; Eropeplus †Euryotomys; Golunda; Gracilimus; Grammomys; Hadromys; Haeromys; Halmaheramys; Hapalomys; Heimyscus †Hooijeromys †Huaxiamys †Huerzelerimys; Hybomys; Hydromys; Hylomyscus; Hyomys; Hyorhinomys; Kadarsanomys †Karnimata; Komodomys †Kritimys; Lamottemys; Leggadina; Lemniscomys; Lenomys; Lenothrix; Leopoldamys; Leporillus; Leptomys; Limnomys; Lorentzimys; Macruromys; Madromys; Malacomys; Mallomys †Malpaisomys; Mammelomys †Maneramus; Margaretamys; Mastacomys; Mastomys; Maxomys; Melasmothrix; Melomys; Mesembriomys; Microhydromys; Micromys †Mikrotia; Millardia; Mirzamys; Montemys; Muriculus; Musseromys; Mus; Mylomys; Myomyscus; Myotomys; Nesokia; Nesoromys; Nilopegamys; Niviventer; Notomys; Ochromyscus; Oenomys †Orientalomys; Otomys; Palawanomys †Paraethomys †Parapodemus; Papagomys; Parahydromys; Paraleptomys; Paramelomys; Parotomys †Parapelomys; Paucidentomys; Paruromys; Paulamys; Pelomys; Phloeomys; Pithecheir; Pithecheirops; Pogonomelomys; Pogonomys; Praomys †Progonomys; Protochromys †Qianomys; Pseudohydromys; Pseudomys †Ratchaburimys; Rattus; Rhabdomys †Rhagamys †Rhagapodemus; Rhynchomys †Saidomys; Saxatilomys; Serengetimys; Solomys; Sommeromys; Soricomys †Spelaeomys; Srilankamys; Stenocephalemys †Stephanomys; Stochomys; Sundamys; Taeromys; Tarsomys; Tateomys; Thallomys; Thamnomys; Tokudaia; Tonkinomys; Tryphomys; Uromys; Vandeleuria; Vernaya; Waiomys †Wushanomys; Xenuromys; Xeromys †Yunomys; Zelotomys; Zyzomys

= Murinae =

Old World rats and mice Temporal range: Middle Miocene – recent, 14–0 Ma

Subfamily of rodents

The Old World rats and mice, part of the subfamily Murinae in the family Muridae, comprise at least 519 species. Members of this subfamily are called murines. In terms of species richness, this subfamily is larger than all mammal families except the Cricetidae and Muridae, and is larger than all mammal orders except the bats and the remainder of the rodents.

== Description ==
The Murinae are native to Africa, Europe, Asia, and Australia. They are terrestrial placental mammals. They have also been introduced to all continents except Antarctica, and are serious pest animals. This is particularly true in island communities where they have contributed to the endangerment and extinction of many native animals.

Two prominent murine species have become vital laboratory animals: the brown rat and house mouse are both used as medical subjects.

The murines have a distinctive molar pattern that involves three rows of cusps instead of two, the primitive pattern seen most frequently in muroid rodents.

== Fossils ==
The first known appearance of the Murinae in the fossil record is about 14 million years ago with the fossil genus Antemus. Antemus is thought to derive directly from Potwarmus, which has a more primitive tooth pattern. Likewise, two genera, Progonomys and Karnimata, are thought to derive directly from Antemus. Progonomys is thought to be the ancestor of Mus and relatives, while Karnimata was previously thought to lead to Rattus and relatives, although it is now thought to be a member of the extant tribe Praomyini. All of these fossils are found in the well-preserved and easily dated Siwalik fossil beds of Pakistan. The transition from Potwarmus to Antemus to Progonomys and Karnimata is considered an excellent example of anagenic evolution.

== Taxonomy ==
Most of the Murinae have been poorly studied. Some genera have been grouped, such as the hydromyine water rats, conilurine or pseudomyine Australian mice, or the phloeomyine Southeast Asian forms. It appears as if genera from Southeast Asian islands and Australia may be early offshoots compared to mainland forms. The vlei rats in the genera Otomys and Parotomys are often placed in a separate subfamily, Otomyinae, but have been shown to be closely related to African murines in spite of their uniqueness.

Three genera, Uranomys, Lophuromys, and Acomys, were once considered to be murines, but were found to be more closely related to gerbils through molecular phylogenetics. They have been assigned a new subfamily status, Deomyinae.

Molecular phylogenetic studies of Murinae include Lecompte, et al. (2008), which analyzes African murine species based on the mitochondrial cytochrome b gene and two nuclear gene fragments. Lecompte, et al. (2008) estimates that African murines colonized Africa from Asia approximately 11 million years ago during the Miocene.

The following phylogeny of 16 Murinae genera, based on molecular phylogenetic analysis of the Interphotoreceptor Retinoid Binding Protein (IRBP) gene, is from Jansa & Weksler (2004: 264).

- Murinae
  - Phloeomys
  - - - Micromys
      - - Maxomys
        - - Niviventer
          - - Sundamys
            - Rattus
    - - Rhynchomys
      - - Otomys
        - - Aethomys
          - - Rhabdomys
            - Grammomys
      - - Tokudaia
        - - Mus
          - - Mastomys
            - - Praomys
              - Hylomyscus

The following phylogeny of 139 Murinae genera, is from Steppan and Schenk (2017) and Rowe et al. (2019).

- Murinae
  - - - Phloeomyini
        - Phloeomys
        - - - Carpomys
            - Musseromys
          - - Batomys
            - Crateromys
    - - - Rattini
          - Micromys
          - - - Crunomys
              - Maxomys
            - - - - Sommeromys
                  - - Gracilimus
                    - Waiomys
                - Hyorhinomys
                - - - Melasmothrix
                    - Tateomys
                  - - Echiothrix
                    - Paucidentomys
              - - - - Tonkinomys
                    - Saxatilomys
                  - - - Lenothrix
                      - Margaretamys
                    - - - Chiromyscus
                        - - Dacnomys
                          - Leopoldamys
                      - Niviventer
                - - Srilankamys
                  - Berylmys
                  - - - Papagomys
                      - - Komodomys
                        - - Sundamys
                          - - - Bunomys
                              - Bullimus
                            - - Halmaheramys
                              - - Taeromys
                                - - Frateromys
                                  - - Eropeplus
                                    - Lenomys
                    - - - Diplothrix
                        - - Bandicota
                          - Nesokia
                      - - Rattus
                        - - Kadarsanomys
                          - - Limnomys
                            - Tarsomys
      - - - Hydromyini
            - Haeromys
            - - Chiropodomys
              - - - Apomys
                  - - Archboldomys
                    - - Rhynchomys
                      - - Chrotomys
                        - Soricomys
                - - - Anisomys
                    - - Lorentzimys
                      - - - Macruromys
                          - Chiruromys
                        - - Hyomys
                          - Pogonomys
                  - - - Coccymys
                      - - - Mammelomys
                          - Xenuromys
                        - - - Abeomelomys
                            - Pogonomelomys
                          - Mallomys
                    - - - - Leptomys
                          - Paraleptomys
                        - - - Crossomys
                            - - Baiyankamys
                              - - Hydromys
                                - Parahydromys
                          - - - Microhydromys
                              - Pseudohydromys
                            - Xeromys
                      - - - Zyzomys
                          - - Leggadina
                            - - Notomys
                              - - Mastacomys
                                - Pseudomys
                        - - - Leporillus
                            - - Conilurus
                              - Mesembriomys
                          - - Uromys
                            - - Paramelomys
                              - - Solomys
                                - - Melomys
                                  - Protochromys
        - - - - Vandeleurini
                Vandeleuria
            - - - Millardini
                  - - Cremnomys
                    - Diomys
                    - Madromys
                    - Millardia
                  - - Pithecheir
                    - Pithecheirops
              - - Otomyini
                  - Otomys
                  - Parotomys
                - Arvicanthini
                  - - Golunda
                    - Oenomys
                  - - - Thallomys
                      - - Hybomys
                        - - Dephomys
                          - Stochomys
                    - - - Micaelamys
                        - - Aethomys
                          - - Grammomys
                            - Thamnomys
                      - - Dasymys
                        - - Desmomys
                          - - - Pelomys
                              - Mylomys
                            - - Rhabdomys
                              - - Arvicanthis
                                - Lemniscomys
          - - - Malacomyini
                Malacomys
              - Apodemini
                - Tokudaia
                - Apodemus
            - - Murini
                - Muriculus
                - Mus
              - Praomyini
                - - Myomyscus
                  - Stenocephalemys
                - - - Heimyscus
                    - Hylomyscus
                  - - - - Colomys
                        - Zelotomys
                      - Mastomys
                    - Praomys
  - - Hapalomyini
      Hapalomys

== Distribution ==
The following is a list of Murinae genus divisions ordered by the continents that they are endemic to. Most of the diversity is located in Southeast Asia and Australasia.

- Africa
  - Aethomys division – 1 genus
  - Arvicanthis division – 6 genera
  - Colomys division – 3 genera
  - Dasymys division – 8 genera
  - Hybomys division – 3 genera
  - Malacomys division – 1 genus
  - Oenomys division – 5 genea
  - Otomyini division/tribe – 3 genera
- Eurasia
  - Apodemus division – 2 genera
  - Micromys division – 6 genera
  - Genus Mus
- South Asia
  - Golunda division – 1 genus
  - Millardia division – 4 genera
- Southeast Asia
  - Dacnomys division – 8 genera
  - Hadromys division – 1 genus
  - Maxomys division – 1 genus
  - Pithecheir division – 6 genera
  - Rattus division – 21 genera
- Philippines
  - Chrotomys division – 5 genera
  - Crunomys division – 2 genera
  - Phloeomys division – 4 genera
  - Genus Musseromys
- Sulawesi
  - Crunomys division – 2 genera
  - Echiothrix division – 1 genus
  - Melasmothrix division – 2 genera
- Moluccas
  - Halmaheramys division – 1 genus
- New Guinea
  - Hydromys division – 6 genera
  - Lorentzimys division – 1 genus
  - Pogonomys division – 11 genera
  - Uromys division – 5 genera
  - Xeromys division – 3 genera
  - Genus Mirzamys
- Australia
  - Pseudomys division – 8 genera

== List of species ==
As of 2005, the Murinae contained 129 genera in 584 species. Musser and Carleton (2005) divided the Murinae into 29 genus divisions. They treated the Otomyinae as a separate subfamily, but all molecular analyses conducted to date have supported their inclusion in the Murinae as relatives of African genera. In a recent expedition in the Philippines, seven more Apomys mice were added and the genus was proposed to split into two subgenera - Apomys and Megapomys, based on morphological and cytochrome b DNA sequences. In 2021, a major revision was taken of Praomyini.

The tribes are based on the classification by the American Society of Mammalogists. Some of the division placement is based on Pages et al., 2015 and Rowe et al., 2019.

SUBFAMILY MURINAE - Old World rats and mice

- Tribe Apodemini
  - Genus Apodemus - Old World field mice
  - Genus Rhagamys †
  - Genus Tokudaia - Ryūkyū spiny rats
- Tribe Arvicanthini
  - Aethomys division
    - Genus Aethomys - bush rats
    - Genus Micaelamys
  - Arvicanthis division
    - Genus Arvicanthis - unstriped grass mice
    - Genus Desmomys
    - Genus Lemniscomys - striped grass mice
    - Genus Mylomys (African Groove-toothed Rat)
    - Genus Pelomys - groove-toothed creek rats
    - Genus Rhabdomys (Four-striped Grass Mouse)
  - Dasymys division
    - Genus Dasymys - shaggy swamp rats
  - Golunda division
    - Genus Golunda (Indian bush rat)
  - Hybomys division
    - Genus Dephomys - defua rats
    - Genus Hybomys - hump-nosed mice
    - Genus Stochomys (target rat)
    - Genus Typomys
  - Oenomys division
    - Genus †Canariomys - Canary Islands giant rats
    - Genus Grammomys
    - Genus Lamottemys
    - Genus †Malpaisomys
    - Genus Oenomys - rufous-nosed rats
    - Genus Thallomys - acacia rats
    - Genus Thamnomys - thicket rats
- Tribe Hapalomyini
  - Genus Hapalomys - marmoset rats
- Tribe Hydromyini
  - Chiropodomys division (alternately considered a distinct tribe, Chiropodomyini)
    - Genus Chiropodomys - pencil-tailed tree mice
  - Chrotomys division
    - Genus Apomys
    - Genus Archboldomys (Mount Isarog shrew rats)
    - Genus Chrotomys - Luzon striped rats
    - Genus Soricomys
    - Genus Rhynchomys - shrew-like rats
  - Conilurus division
    - Genus Conilurus - rabbit rats
    - Genus Leporillus - Australian stick-nest rats
    - Genus Mesembriomys - tree rats
  - Haeromys division
    - Genus Haeromys - pygmy tree mice
  - Hydromys division
    - Genus Baiyankamys (formerly in Hydromys)
    - Genus Crossomys (earless water rat)
    - Genus Hydromys - water rats
    - Genus Leptomys
    - Genus Microhydromys
    - Genus Mirzamys
    - Genus Parahydromys
    - Genus Paraleptomys
    - Genus Pseudohydromys - New Guinea false water rats
    - Genus Xeromys (false water rat)
  - Mallomys division
    - Genus Abeomelomys
    - Genus Mallomys - giant tree rats
    - Genus Mammelomys
    - Genus Pogonomelomys - Rummler's mosaic tailed rats
    - Genus Xenuromys (white-tailed New Guinea rat)
  - Pogonomys division
    - Genus Anisomys (powerful-toothed rat)
    - Genus Chiruromys
    - Genus Hyomys - white-eared rats
    - Genus Lorentzimys (New Guinea jumping mouse)
    - Genus Macruromys - New Guinean rats
    - Genus Pogonomys - prehensile-tailed rats
  - Pseudomys division
    - Genus Leggadina
    - Genus Mastacomys
    - Genus Notomys - Australian hopping mice
    - Genus Pseudomys - Australian native mice
    - Genus Zyzomys - thick-tailed rats
  - Uromys division
    - Genus Melomys - banana rats
    - Genus Paramelomys
    - Genus Protochromys
    - Genus Solomys - naked-tailed rats
    - Genus Uromys - giant naked-tailed rats
  - Unknown division
    - Genus Brassomys
    - Genus Coccymys
- Tribe Malacomyini
  - Genus Malacomys - big-eared swamp rats
- Tribe Millardini
  - Millardia division
    - Genus Cremnomys
    - Genus Diomys (Manipur mouse)
    - Genus Madromys
    - Genus Millardia - Asian soft-furred rats
  - Pithecheir division
    - Genus Pithecheir - monkey-footed rats
    - Genus Pithecheirops
- Tribe Murini
  - Genus Mus - true mice
- Tribe Otomyini
  - Genus Myotomys - African karoo rats (now classified in Otomys)
  - Genus Otomys - groove-toothed or vlei rats
  - Genus Parotomys - whistling rats
- Tribe Phloeomyini
  - Genus Batomys - Luzon and Mindanao forest rats
  - Genus Carpomys - Luzon rats
  - Genus Crateromys - cloudrunners
  - Genus Musseromys - tree mice
  - Genus Phloeomys - slender-tailed cloud rats
- Tribe Praomyini
  - Genus Chingawaemys - Chingawa forest rat
  - Genus Colomys (African wading rat)
  - Genus Congomys
  - Genus Heimyscus
  - Genus Hylomyscus - African wood mice
  - Genus Mastomys - multimammate mice
  - Genus Montemys
  - Genus Myomyscus
  - Genus Nilopegamys
  - Genus Ochromyscus - rock mice
  - Genus Praomys - African soft-furred rats
  - Genus Serengetimys
  - Genus Stenocephalemys - Ethiopian narrow-headed rats
  - Genus Zelotomys - stink mice
- Tribe Rattini
  - Berylmys division
    - Genus Berylmys - white-toothed rats
  - Bunomys division
    - Genus Bullimus
    - Genus Bunomys
    - Genus Eropeplus (Sulawesian soft-furred rat)
    - Genus Halmaheramys
    - Genus Komodomys
    - Genus Lenomys (trefoil-toothed rat)
    - Genus Papagomys - Flores giant rats
    - Genus Paruromys (Sulawesian giant rat)
    - Genus Paulamys
    - Species "Rattus" timorensis
    - Genus Sundamys - giant Sunda rats
    - Genus Taeromys
  - Dacnomys division
    - Genus Chiromyscus (Fea's tree rat)
    - Genus Dacnomys (Large-toothed giant rat)
    - Genus Lenothrix (grey tree rat)
    - Genus Leopoldamys - long-tailed giant rats
    - Genus Margaretamys - margareta rats
    - Genus Niviventer - white-bellied rats
    - Genus Saxatilomys
    - Genus Tonkinomys
  - Echiothrix division
    - Genus Echiothrix
    - Genus Hyorhinomys
    - Genus Melasmothrix (lesser Sulawesian shrew rat)
    - Genus Paucidentomys
    - Genus Sommeromys
    - Genus Tateomys - greater Sulawesian shrew rats
    - Genus Waiomys - Sulawesi water rat
  - Maxomys division
    - Genus Crunomys - Philippine and Sulawesian shrew rats
    - Genus Maxomys (rajah rats)
  - Micromys division (alternately considered a distinct tribe, Micromyini)
    - Genus Micromys (Old World harvest mice)
  - Rattus division
    - Genus Abditomys
    - Genus Bandicota - bandicoot rats
    - Genus Diplothrix
    - Genus Kadarsanomys
    - Genus Limnomys
    - Genus Nesokia (short-tailed bandicoot rat)
    - Genus Nesoromys
    - Genus Palawanomys (Palawan rat)
    - Genus Rattus - typical rats
    - Genus Tarsomys
    - Genus Tryphomys (Mearn's Luzon rat)
  - Srilankamys division
    - Genus Srilankamys (Ceylonese rats)
  - Unknown division
    - Genus Anonymomys (Mindoro rat)
- Tribe Vandeleurini
  - Genus Vandeleuria - long-tailed climbing mice
- incertae sedis
  - Genus †Alormys
  - Genus †Coryphomys
  - Genus Hadromys
  - Genus †Hooijeromys
  - Genus †Milimonggamys
  - Genus †Rakasamys
  - Genus Vernaya (Vernay's climbing mouse)
  - Genus †Spelaeomys
