= Sommer's Sulawesi rat =

Conservation status
- Data Deficient (IUCN 3.1)

Scientific classification
- Kingdom: Animalia
- Phylum: Chordata
- Class: Mammalia
- Order: Rodentia
- Family: Muridae
- Tribe: Rattini
- Genus: Sommeromys; Musser & Durden, 2002
- Species: S. macrorhinos

Binomial name
- Sommeromys macrorhinos Musser & Durden, 2002

Species of rodent

Sommer's Sulawesi rat (Sommeromys macrorhinos) is a species of rodent in the family Muridae from Sulawesi. It is the only species in the genus Sommeromys and was described by Musser & Durden in 2002.

== Distribution ==
S. macrorhinos is known from only one specimen, AMNH 226956 (American Museum of Natural History, catalogue number 226956). This specimen was caught at 2400 m above sea level on Gunung Tokala, a mountain between the Rampi and Seko valleys in the province of Sulawesi Tengah, in primary mossy forest which was somewhat disturbed by human activities. The describers expected that the genus also occurs in other high montane forests of Sulawesi.

It is also found on Mount Gandangdewata, West Sulawesi.

== Discovery ==
On the first of August, 1973, the NAMRU team that would discover S. macrorhinos reached Gunung Tokala. Despite a heavy, cold rain, someone set some Victor rat traps and found one specimen each of Tateomys rhinogradoides and S. macrorhinos the following day. On the specimen of S. macrorhinos, a louse was found, which was also a new species, Hoplopleura sommeri.

Sommer's Sulawesi rat was named after Helmut G. Sommer, Scientific Technician at the American Museum of Natural History.

== Characteristics ==
Sommer's Sulawesi rat is extremely small and has a long muzzle and an extremely long tail, both absolutely and relatively. It mainly feeds on insects. The stomach of the only known specimen contained some nematodes, fly eggs, and fragments of insects. Species of Bunomys, Paruromys, and Taeromys do not share the diagnostic characteristics of Sommeromys and are larger. Haeromys species are smaller (head-body 62–78 mm, tail up to 133 mm). Lenomys and Eropeplus species are much bigger (up to 301 and 255 mm, respectively), and have a tail which is as long as head-body (Lenomys) or somewhat longer (Eropeplus). Margaretamys species are somewhat larger (96–197 mm). Echiothrix is much larger (up to 225 mm), has a prolonged muzzle and prolonged rostra and a bicolored tail (up to 258 mm). Melasmothrix has a dark chestnut fur, a short tail and paws and long claws. Tateomys rhinogradoides is larger, with a dark, brownish grey pelage, robust hind feet, and a long tail. T. macrocercus is smaller than T. rhinogradoides, has a similar fur colour, but has an extremely long tail, long hind feet and narrow but long claws on the hind feet. Crunomys celebensis has a shorter and broader rostrum.

Measurements (all in mm):

Head-body length	99
Tail length	186
Length of hind feet	31
Length of ear	16

== Relationships ==
According to the discoverers, S. macrorhinos is a member of the so-called "Old Endemics " of Sulawesi and the Philippines. It is especially related to Crunomys, which lives on both Sulawesi and the Philippines and the Philippine Archboldomys. The Melasmothrix-Tateomys group may also be related.
