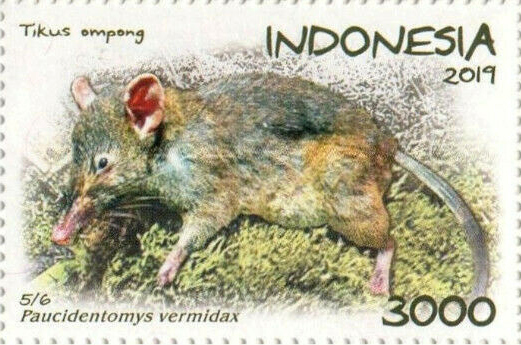
- On an Indonesian stamp

Conservation status
- Near Threatened (IUCN 3.1)

Scientific classification
- Kingdom: Animalia
- Phylum: Chordata
- Class: Mammalia
- Order: Rodentia
- Family: Muridae
- Tribe: Rattini
- Genus: Paucidentomys; Esselstyn, Achmadi & Rowe, 2012
- Species: P. vermidax

Binomial name
- Paucidentomys vermidax Esselstyn, Achmadi & Rowe, 2012
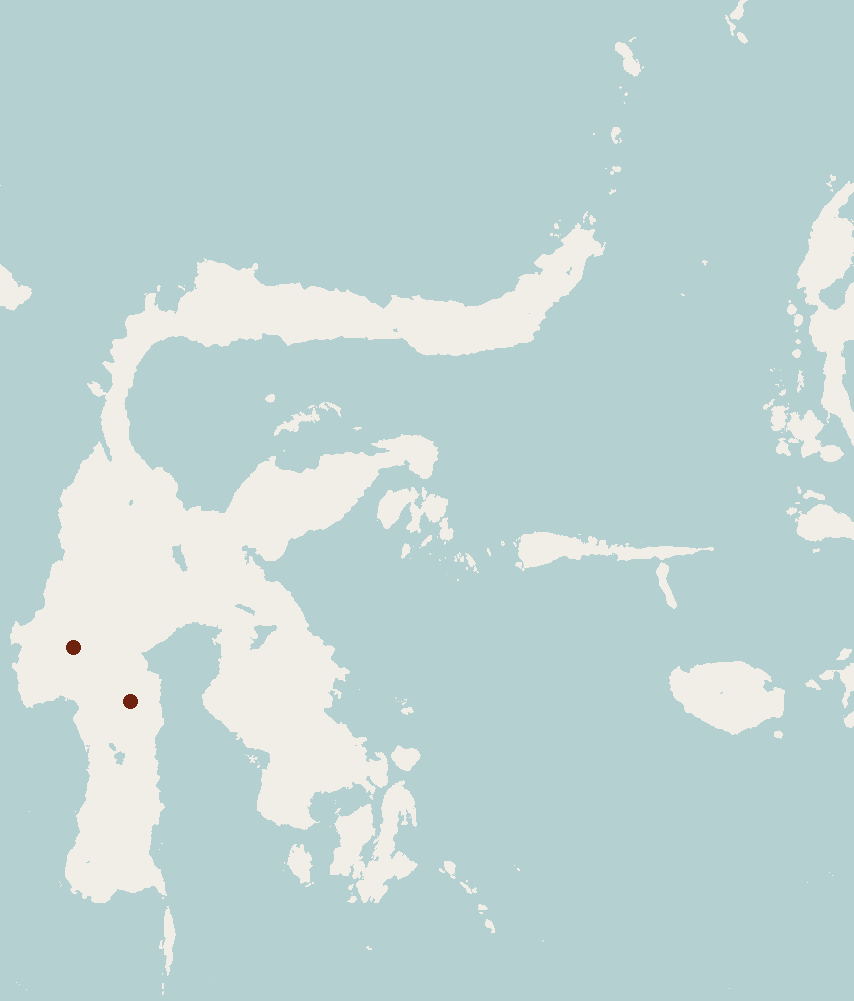
- Specimen collections from Sulawesi, Indonesia

= Edented Sulawesi rat =

Genus of rodents

Paucidentomys is a genus of rodents of a type commonly known as shrew-rats which was discovered in 2012 in a remote rainforest on the Indonesian island, Sulawesi. The genus is monotypic, consisting of the species Paucidentomys vermidax, or the edented Sulawesi rat. The Latin name may also be translated to its other common name "few-toothed worm-eating rat", referring to the fact that they have only two teeth and may live exclusively on a diet of earthworms.

== Description ==
Paucidentomys vermidax is larger than Melasmothrix naso, Sommeromys macrorhinos and Tateomys macrocercus, similar in size to Tateomys rhinogradoides, smaller than Rhynchomys soricoides and substantially smaller than species of Echiothrix. The face is more elongate than that of any other Sulawesi shrew-rat, but similar in this regard to Rhynchomys. It has a very long rostrum (relative to other Sulawesi shrew-rats), small eyes, large ears, a soft pelage and a long, thick, hairy and dorsoventrally bicoloured tail.

=== Unique dentition ===
Paucidentomys vermidax is the only known rodent with no molars, which is an adaptation to its diet which may be exclusively earthworms (it appears to be a specialist vermivore based on the stomach contents of one individual). Moreover, rather than gnawing incisors, this animal has bicuspid upper incisors, which is also unique among the more than 2,200 species of rodents. The upper incisors are short with an anterior cusp and slightly inferior posterior cusp; these cusps are connected by a sharp, concave cutting edge at the lateral margin of the tooth. The pterygoid plate is absent. The dentary is long and delicate, lacking significant muscle attachment points. The lower incisors are unicuspid, procumbent, sharp and delicate. Its dental formula is 1.0.0.01.0.0.0.

== Distribution ==
Paucidentomys vermidax is known from Mount Gandangdewata and Mount Latimojong in Sulawesi, Indonesia.

== Etymology ==
The generic name combines the Latin paucus (few) with dentis (tooth) and the Greek mys (mouse) in reference to the lack of molars. The epithet is a hybrid of vermi (worm) and edax (devourer), in reference to the animal's diet.
