= P. platyops =

P. platyops may refer to:

- Paramelomys platyops, the lowland mosaic-tailed rat, a rodent species found in Indonesia and Papua New Guinea
- Potorous platyops, the broad-faced potoroo, an extinct marsupial species that once lived in Australia
