= L. canus =

L. canus may refer to:

- Larus canus, a medium-sized gull species
- Lenothrix canus, an Old World rat species
