= Lenomys grovesi =

Lenomys grovesi Temporal range: Holocene

Scientific classification
- Kingdom: Animalia
- Phylum: Chordata
- Class: Mammalia
- Order: Rodentia
- Family: Muridae
- Genus: Lenomys
- Species: †L. grovesi

Binomial name
- †Lenomys grovesi Musser, 2015

Fossil species of rodent

Lenomys grovesi is an extinct species of rodent that lived on Sulawesi, Indonesia as recently as 2000 BP. The specific epithet honours Colin Groves, a colleague and friend of the author.

== Diagnosis ==
The only known remains of this species is a subfossil right dentary from an adult collected in 1969. The dentary is mostly undamaged except for the missing tip of the coronoid process. The type locality of the species is Leang Burung 1, a cave near the village of Pakalu. Remains from the cave have been dated at 2820 ± 210 (2,360–3,460) BP, indicating that Lenomys grovesi lived as recently as 3,000–2,000 years ago.

== Description ==
Lenomys grovesi was smaller than the living trefoil-toothed giant rat (Lenomys meyeri), assuming the size of the dentary and molars reflect overall physical size of these rodents. No known subfossil or living examples of the trefoil-toothed giant rat match the dimensions of L. grovesi, so it can be assumed that the species is distinct.

== Distribution and habitat ==
It is only known from the Maros karst region in southwestern Sulawesi. The environment that L. grovesi would have lived in at the time was probably a mosaic of primary forest, expanses of secondary forest, and possibly more open habitats.
