= Stein's paramelomys =

Conservation status
- Data Deficient (IUCN 3.1)

Scientific classification
- Kingdom: Animalia
- Phylum: Chordata
- Class: Mammalia
- Order: Rodentia
- Family: Muridae
- Genus: Paramelomys
- Species: P. steini

Binomial name
- Paramelomys steini Rümmler, 1935

Species of rodent

Stein's paramelomys, (Paramelomys steini), is a species of rodent native to Indonesia. Official observation of this species was only obtained on the Wayland Mountain on the island of New Guinea (Papua Province, Indonesia). It has only been observed on montane (high-altitude) forests. The population of P. steini is not known.

It was previously classified as Paramelomys rubex before it was recognized as separate species. P. steini has a larger body but shorter and wider hind feet.
