= Northern water rat =

Conservation status
- Endangered (IUCN 3.1)

Scientific classification
- Kingdom: Animalia
- Phylum: Chordata
- Class: Mammalia
- Order: Rodentia
- Family: Muridae
- Genus: Paraleptomys
- Species: P. rufilatus

Binomial name
- Paraleptomys rufilatus Osgood, 1945
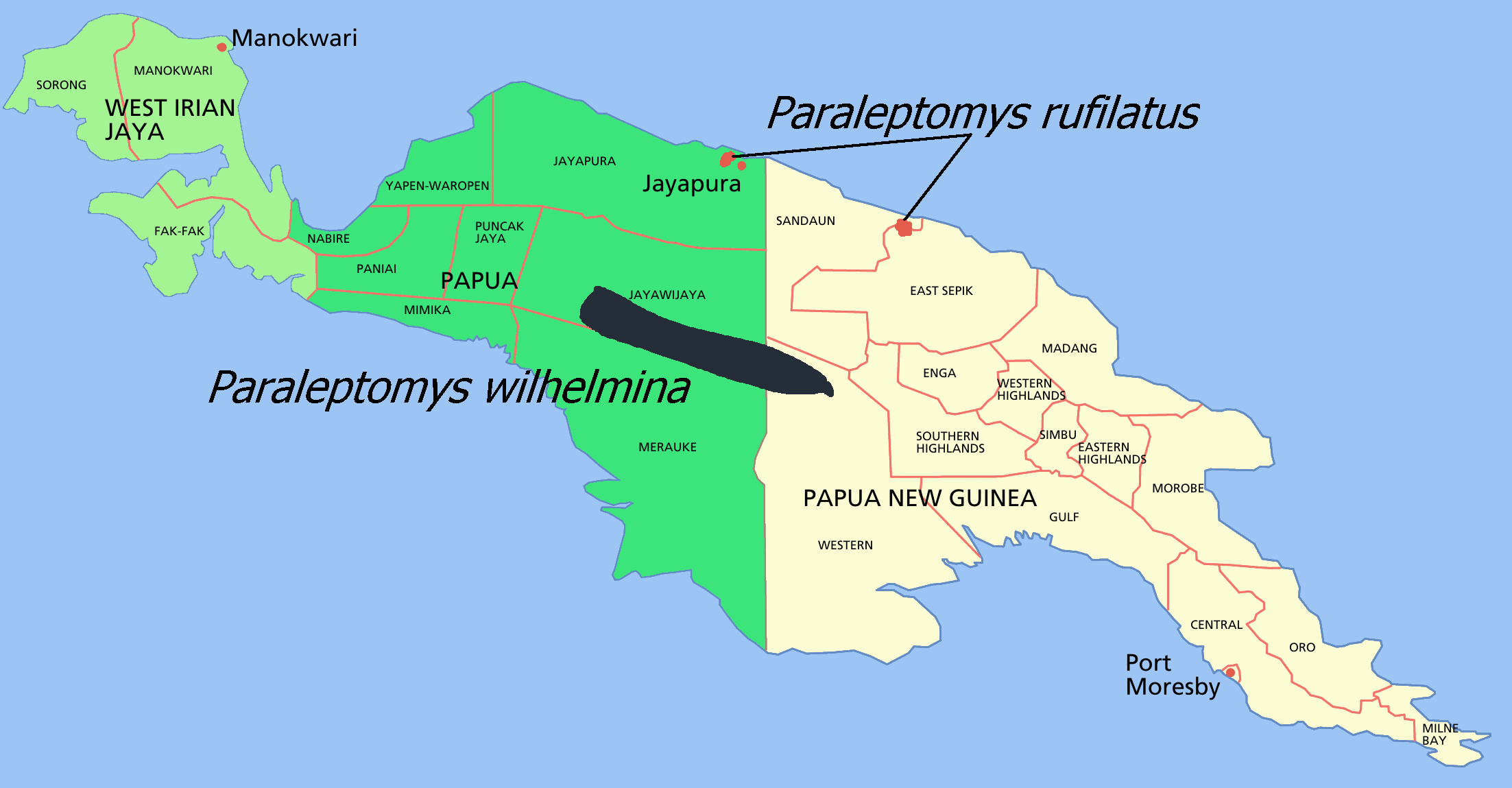
- Distribution map on New Guinea. P. rufilatus is in red.

Species of rodent

The northern water rat (Paraleptomys rufilatus) is an endangered species of rodent in the family Muridae found in the highlands of New Guinea.

== Distribution ==
The northern water rat is a rodent of the genus Paraleptomys appearing on New Guinea. This species is found at altitudes of 1,200–1,800 metres (3,900–5,900 ft) in the North Coast Ranges, the mountains Mount Dafonsero (Cyclops Mountains, Indonesia), Mount Somoro (Torricelli Mountains, Papua New Guinea) and Mount Benawa (Bewani mountains, Papua New Guinea). This species has a small, fragmented distribution and is probably quite rare. They are probably partly active during the day. By Olo (the local tribe on Mount Somoro in Sandaun Province), this animal is referred to as "timbri".

== Description ==
P. rufilatus is larger than the other species of the genus, P. wilhelmina, and is less uniform in colour; the throat is white and the flanks are orange-like, while both body parts are brown in P. wilhelmina. The head-body length is 118–135 millimetres (4.6–5.3 in), tail length 127–146 mm (5.0–5.7 in), the hind foot length 30–35 mm (1.2–1.4 in), ear length 17–20 mm (0.67–0.79 in) and weighs 54–58 grams (1.9–2.0 oz).
