= Daovantien's limestone rat =

Conservation status
- Data Deficient (IUCN 3.1)

Scientific classification
- Kingdom: Animalia
- Phylum: Chordata
- Class: Mammalia
- Order: Rodentia
- Family: Muridae
- Tribe: Rattini
- Genus: Tonkinomys; Musser, Lunde, & Son, 2006
- Species: T. daovantieni

Binomial name
- Tonkinomys daovantieni Musser, Lunde, & Son, 2006

Genus of rodents

Daovantien's limestone rat (Tonkinomys daovantieni) is a genus of Muridae rodent native to northeastern Vietnam. It was first discovered in a forested talus habitat in the Huu Lien Nature Reserve, Lang Son Province. It is the only known species in the genus Tonkinomys.

== Description ==
The genus is destiguished from other Indomalayan murids by "semispinous, dense, grayish black fur covering upperparts; a dark gray venter; gray ears; a thick, bicolored tail considerably shorter than length of head and body; and large, extremely bulbous footpads".

Its body size, build and some cranial features were described as similar to the species Leopoldamys neilli found in Thailand. Other cranial features as well as molar occlusal patterns resemble species of the Niviventer, Chiromyscus, and Saxatilomys genera native to the Indomalayan region.

== Habitat ==
The genus is petricolous, meaning it lives in a rocky habitat, and was found only in talus composed of large limestone blocks. It is thought that its distribution in the Huu Lien Nature reserve is patchy.
