= Halmaheramys bokimekot =

Conservation status
- Data Deficient (IUCN 3.1)

Scientific classification
- Kingdom: Animalia
- Phylum: Chordata
- Class: Mammalia
- Order: Rodentia
- Family: Muridae
- Genus: Halmaheramys
- Species: H. bokimekot

Binomial name
- Halmaheramys bokimekot Fabre Pagès, Musser, Fitriana, Semiadi & Helgen 2013
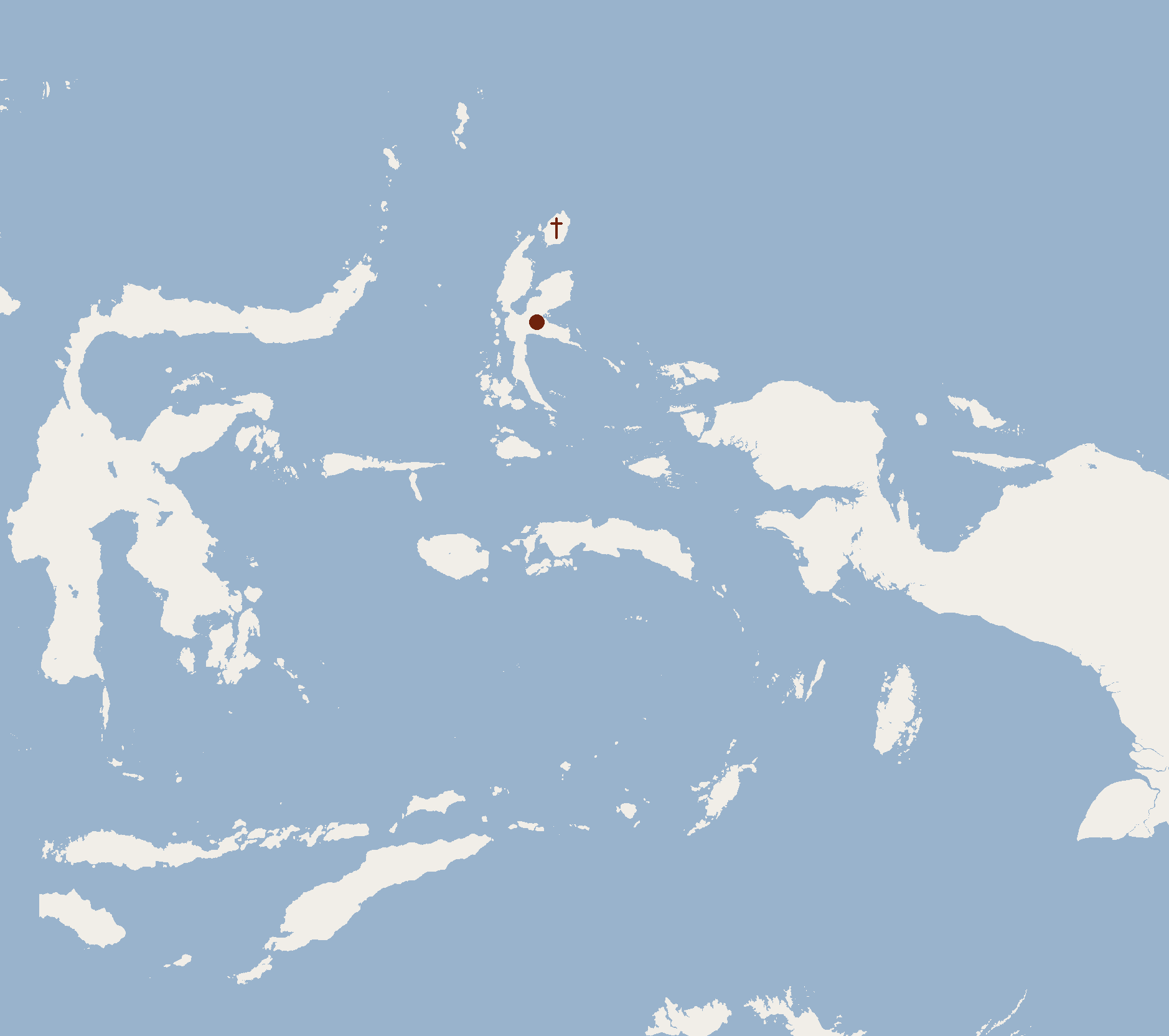
- Distribution of Halmaheramys bokimekot

Species of rodent

Halmaheramys bokimekot, the spiny Boki Mekot rat, is a rodent found on the island of Halmahera in the Molucca archipelago, whose discovery was announced in 2013. This is the only locality where this particular species has been found. H. bokimekot was confirmed as a new species through probabilistic methodologies applied to morphological and molecular data.

Named after its geographical provenance in the North Moluccas, Halmaheramys is the only known murine species endemic to Halmahera. The island is part of the biogeographical province of Wallacea. a transitional zone between the Asian and Australasian realms first identified by Alfred Russel Wallace. It is east of the Wallace and Weber lines, but west of Lydekker's Line. The ancestors of H. bokimekot are believed to have colonized Halmahera from the west, probably from Sulawesi; other native Moluccan rodents are believed or suspected to have arrived from islands to the east, consistent with Wallace's insight. Phylogenetically, Halmaheramys nests within a clade whose other members are the genera Sundamys (from Malaysia and western Indonesia, i.e. Sundaland), Bullimus (from the Philippines), Bunomys, Paruromys and Taeromys (from Sulawesi).

"Project leader Pierre-Henri Fabre from the Center for Macroecology, Evolution and Climate states:

'This new rodent highlights the large amount of unknown biodiversity in this Wallacean region and the importance of its conservation. It constitutes a valuable addition to our knowledge of the Wallacean biodiversity and much remains to be learned about mammalian biodiversity across this region. Zoologists must continue to explore this area in order to discover and describe new species in this highly diverse, but also threatened region.'" This region is threatened due to mining and deforestation occurring in the area.

While the original ancestral area of the Murinae is unclear, it appears that the Philippines played a key role in their early spread. Three key colonization periods have been noted: 1) their arrival in the Philippines during the late Miocene; 2) their dispersal to both Sahul and Sulawesi during the late Miocene; 3) at least six colonizations of the Rattini into the Indo-Pacific area. Changing sea levels during the Plio-Pleistocene likely affected the migration of the Murinae throughout the Indo-Pacific archipelagos because areas which are now submerged would at certain times have been exposed. The current distribution pattern of the Murinae may reflect the Rattini's role as the most recently successful clade within the Southeast Asian region; they diversified greatly since the late Miocene, possibly displacing older murine lineages from the Indo-Pacific.

The rat has a long face, spiky brownish grey fur on its back and a greyish white belly with scattered bristly and spiny hairs, and a tail shorter than the head-body length with a white tip. Other characteristics that when put together set H. bokimekot apart from other members of the family Muridae include: a medium-sized body, moderately long muzzle with dark brown/greyish ears, white digits and dorsal surfaces of carpel and metacarpal regions, three pairs of teats (two inguinal and one post auxiliary), and at least three young per litter. It is believed to be omnivorous and terrestrial.
