= Phou Hin Poun National Biodiversity Conservation Area =

National Biodiversity Conservation Area in Laos

- Phou Hin Poun National Protected Area
- IUCN category VI (protected area with sustainable use of natural resources)
- Location within Laos
- Location: Khammouane, Laos
- Coordinates: 17°47′37″N 104°47′02″E
- Area: 1,801.49 km^{2} (695.56 sq mi)
- Designation: National
- Designated: 1993
- Named for: Phou Hin Poun, Laotian for limestone mountain
- Governing body: Department of Forestry (DOF), Ministry of Agriculture and Forestry (MAF)

The Phou Hin Poun National Biodiversity Conservation Area, formerly known as the Khammouane Limestone National Biodiversity Conservation Area, is one of 21 National Biodiversity Conservation Areas of the Lao People's Democratic Republic. Located in a limestone tower karst region of the Annamite Range in Khammouane Province, it is home to a number of rare or newly discovered species. National Biodiversity Conservation Areas are not protected by the government of Laos in any meaningful way; the budget for each is about $500. The human population of the NBCA is 29,603.

== Flora and fauna ==
The vegetation of Phou Hin Poun National Biodiversity Conservation Area is shaped by its tropical savanna climate, and the rugged, cave-riddled and porous karst terrain. Over 50% of the landscape is estimated to be rocky outcroppings, and most of the rest is dry evergreen forest and scrubland. This diverse landscape is home to 113 species of mammal, 160 species of bird, 81 species of reptile, 47 species of amphibian and 145 species of fish. There are 41 known species of bats in Phou Hin Poun National Biodiversity Conservation Area, with a single cave, Tam Houay Si, used by 22 species.

The most striking discovery coming from the Phou Hin Poun NBCA is the Laotian rock rat (Laonastes aenigmamus), so unusual that it was first assigned to its own family and later to a family previously thought to be extinct for 11 million years. Another species discovered in the Phou Hin Poun NBCA, Saxatilomys paulinae, represents a new genus of the Murinae subfamily, the Old World rats and mice.

Mammals known or suspected to live in Phou Hin Poun include the Indian elephant (Elephas maximus indicus), the Indochinese tiger (Panthera tigris corbetti), the critically endangered saola (Pseudoryx nghetinhensis), the giant muntjac (Muntiacus vuquangensis), the Assam macaque (Macaca assamensis), François' langur (Semnopithecus francoisi laotum), and the black giant squirrel (Ratufa bicolor). Birds found in Phou Hin Poun NBCA include the grey peacock-pheasant (Polyplectron bicalcaratum), the hill myna (Gracula religiosa), red-collared woodpecker (Picus rabieri), the sooty babbler (Stachyris herberti), and the wreathed hornbill (Rhyticeros undulatus).
