= Long-nosed paramelomys =

Conservation status
- Least Concern (IUCN 3.1)

Scientific classification
- Kingdom: Animalia
- Phylum: Chordata
- Class: Mammalia
- Order: Rodentia
- Family: Muridae
- Genus: Paramelomys
- Species: P. naso

Binomial name
- Paramelomys naso Thomas, 1911

Species of rodent

The long-nosed paramelomys (Paramelomys naso) is a species of rodent of the family Muridae endemic to New Guinea. It is found in the lowlands of the south of the country.

== Classification ==
P. naso is very similar to Paramelomys levipes, and was originally classed as a synonym of Melomys levipes lorentzii, then a subspecies of Melomys levipes. In 1996 the genus Melomys was redefined and Paramelomys was upgraded from a subgenus, creating the species Paramelomys naso and Paramelomys levipes. They are distinguished by P. naso's slightly wider molars.

== Appearance ==
P. naso has a head and body length of 168–188 mm; its tail is between 121–132 mm. The fur is short and smooth, upper parts are brown, the dorsal part of the head is grey and the ventral parts are grey/white. The tail is black with one hair per tail scale.

== Habitat ==
The species is common throughout south and west-central New Guinea in Papua Province, and on Wokam Island in the Aru Islands. It lives in subtropical/tropical lowland forest up to an altitude of 1000 m.

== Preservation ==
Paramelomys naso is listed as least concern on the IUCN Red List. It has a wide distribution, a large population, no real threats, and seems tolerant to loss of habitat caused by logging and palm forest expansion. However, it has been suggested that further studies are needed to determine if the species would be vulnerable to heavy disturbance.
