= Long-tailed rat =

Long-tailed rat can refer to several rodents:

- Leopoldamys edwardsi, from Southeast Asia;
- Melomys levipes, from Australasia;
- Pseudomys higginsi, from Australia;
- Rattus rattus, the black rat, cosmopolitan;
- Sigmodontomys aphrastus, from Costa Rica, Panama, and Ecuador.
