= Chiruromys =

Scientific classification
- Domain: Eukaryota
- Kingdom: Animalia
- Phylum: Chordata
- Class: Mammalia
- Order: Rodentia
- Family: Muridae
- Subfamily: Murinae
- Tribe: Hydromyini
- Genus: Chiruromys; Thomas, 1888

Type species
- Chiruromys forbesi

Species
- Chiruromys forbesi Chiruromys lamia Chiruromys vates

Genus of rodents

Chiruromys is a genus of Old World mouse that is restricted to New Guinea and the nearby islands of Goodenough, Fergusson, and Normanby.

== Characteristics ==
These are small arboreal rats with long tails. Head and body is 8.4–17.5 centimetres (3.3–6.9 in), tail is 12.8–24.5 centimetres (5.0–9.6 in), and weight is 23–122 grams (0.81–4.30 oz). The fur is grey to brown above with a white belly. They are restricted to forests where they spend all of their time in the canopy. They live in groups usually consisting of a breeding pair and their offspring (usually one to three) (Nowak, 1999).

== Classification ==
Musser and Carleton (2005) considered Chiruromys to be a member of the Pogonomys Division within the Murinae along with the genera Pogonomys, Hyomys, Macruromys, Mallomys, Coccymys, and Anisomys. It is considered a New Guinea Old Endemic, part of the initial wave of murines colonizing the island.

== Species ==
Genus Chiruromys

- Greater tree mouse, Chiruromys forbesi
- Lamia, Chiruromys lamia
- Lesser tree mouse, Chiruromys vates
