= Mindoro climbing rat =

Conservation status
- Data Deficient (IUCN 3.1)

Scientific classification
- Kingdom: Animalia
- Phylum: Chordata
- Class: Mammalia
- Order: Rodentia
- Family: Muridae
- Subfamily: Murinae
- Tribe: Rattini
- Genus: Anonymomys; Musser, 1981
- Species: A. mindorensis

Binomial name
- Anonymomys mindorensis Musser, 1981
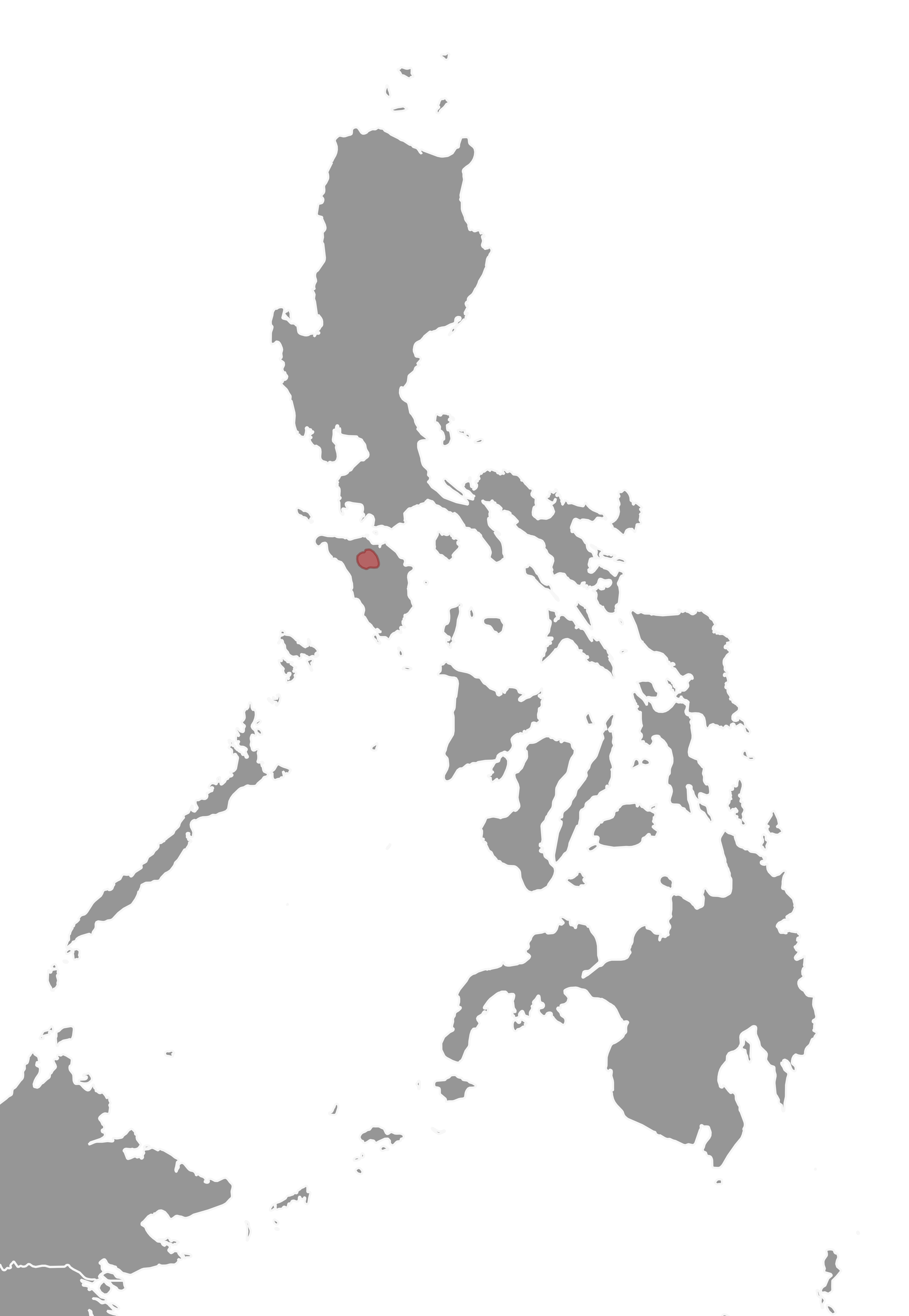

Species of rodent

The Mindoro climbing rat or Mindoro rat (Anonymomys mindorensis) is a species of rodent in the family Muridae. It is found only in the Philippines, and is known only from Ilong Peak in the Halcon Mountains. It is the only species in the genus Anonymomys. Its natural habitat is subtropical or tropical dry forest. It is threatened by habitat loss.
