= Millard's rat =

Conservation status
- Data Deficient (IUCN 3.1)

Scientific classification
- Kingdom: Animalia
- Phylum: Chordata
- Class: Mammalia
- Order: Rodentia
- Family: Muridae
- Subfamily: Murinae
- Tribe: Rattini
- Genus: Dacnomys; Thomas, 1916
- Species: D. millardi

Binomial name
- Dacnomys millardi Thomas, 1916
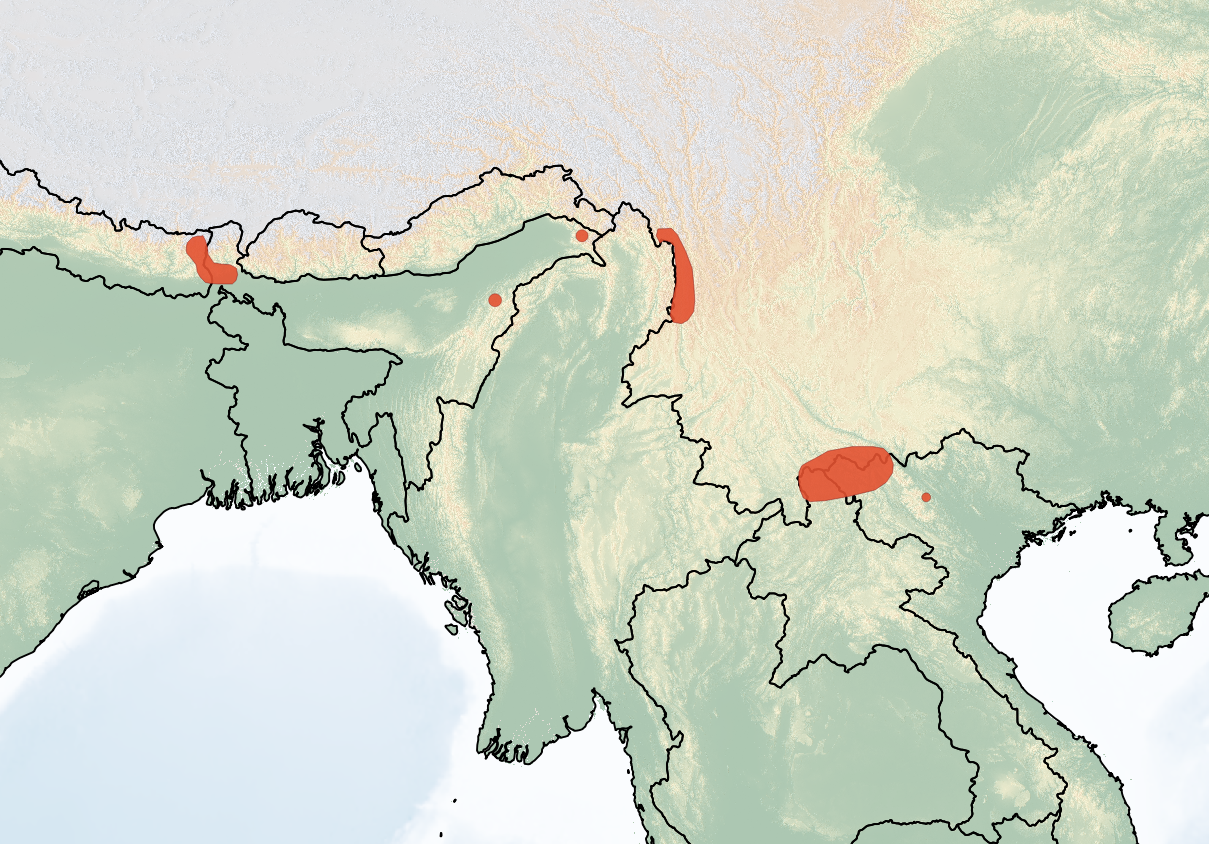

Species of rodent

Millard's rat (Dacnomys millardi) is a species of rodent in the family Muridae. It is the only species in the genus Dacnomys. It is found in China, India, Laos, and Nepal.
