= Paraleptomys =

Scientific classification
- Domain: Eukaryota
- Kingdom: Animalia
- Phylum: Chordata
- Class: Mammalia
- Order: Rodentia
- Family: Muridae
- Subfamily: Murinae
- Tribe: Hydromyini
- Genus: Paraleptomys; Tate & Archbold, 1941

Type species
- Paraleptomys wilhelmina

Species
- Paraleptomys rufilatus Paraleptomys wilhelmina
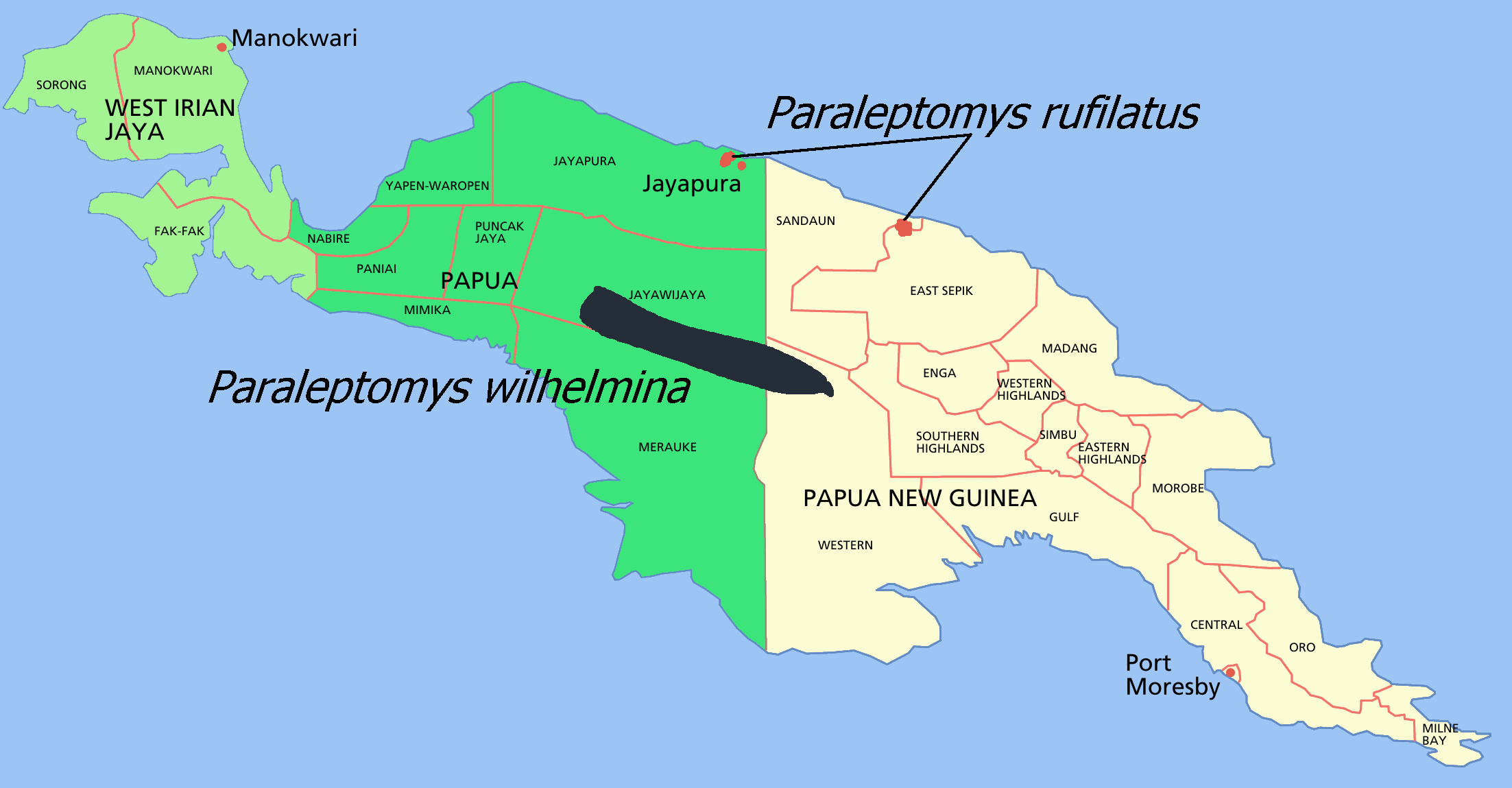
- Distribution map on New Guinea

Genus of rodents

Paraleptomys is a genus of rodents from New Guinea. It is considered part of the New Guinea Old Endemics, meaning it was part of the first wave of murine rodents to colonize the island. Members of the genus are similar to those in Leptomys but differ in that they do not have elongated hind feet or a third molar. Little is known of the two species' biology.

== Species ==
- Genus Paraleptomys
  - Northern water rat (Paraleptomys rufilatus) - Found in the Cyclops mountains of north-central New Guinea
  - Short-haired water rat (Paraleptomys wilhelmina) - found in western and central New Guinea
