= Chiruromys lamia =

Conservation status
- Least Concern (IUCN 3.1)

Scientific classification
- Kingdom: Animalia
- Phylum: Chordata
- Class: Mammalia
- Order: Rodentia
- Family: Muridae
- Genus: Chiruromys
- Species: C. lamia

Binomial name
- Chiruromys lamia Thomas, 1897

Synonyms
- Chiruromys kagi (Tate, 1951)

Species of rodent

Chiruromys lamia, also known as the lamia or the broad-headed tree mouse, is a species of rodent found chiefly in southeastern New Guinea. It is arboreal, living in hollow tree nests, and is found at elevations of 1,200–2,300 metres (3,900–7,500 ft).
