= Lukolela swamp rat =

Conservation status
- Least Concern (IUCN 3.1)

Scientific classification
- Kingdom: Animalia
- Phylum: Chordata
- Class: Mammalia
- Order: Rodentia
- Family: Muridae
- Genus: Congomys
- Species: C. lukolelae

Binomial name
- Congomys lukolelae (Hatt, 1934)

Synonyms
- Malacomys lukolelae (Hatt, 1934); Praomys lukolelae (Hatt, 1934)

Species of rodent

The Lukolela swamp rat (Congomys lukolelae) is a species of rodent in the family Muridae. It is found only in Democratic Republic of the Congo. Its natural habitat is subtropical or tropical moist lowland forest. It is threatened by habitat loss.
