= Wushanomys =

Wushanomys Temporal range: Pleistocene

Scientific classification
- Kingdom: Animalia
- Phylum: Chordata
- Class: Mammalia
- Order: Rodentia
- Family: Muridae
- Subfamily: Murinae
- Genus: †Wushanomys; Zheng, 1993

Extinct genus of rodents

Wushanomys is an extinct genus of murid rodent that inhabited China during the Pleistocene epoch. It is known from two species, W. hypsodontus and W. brachyodus.
