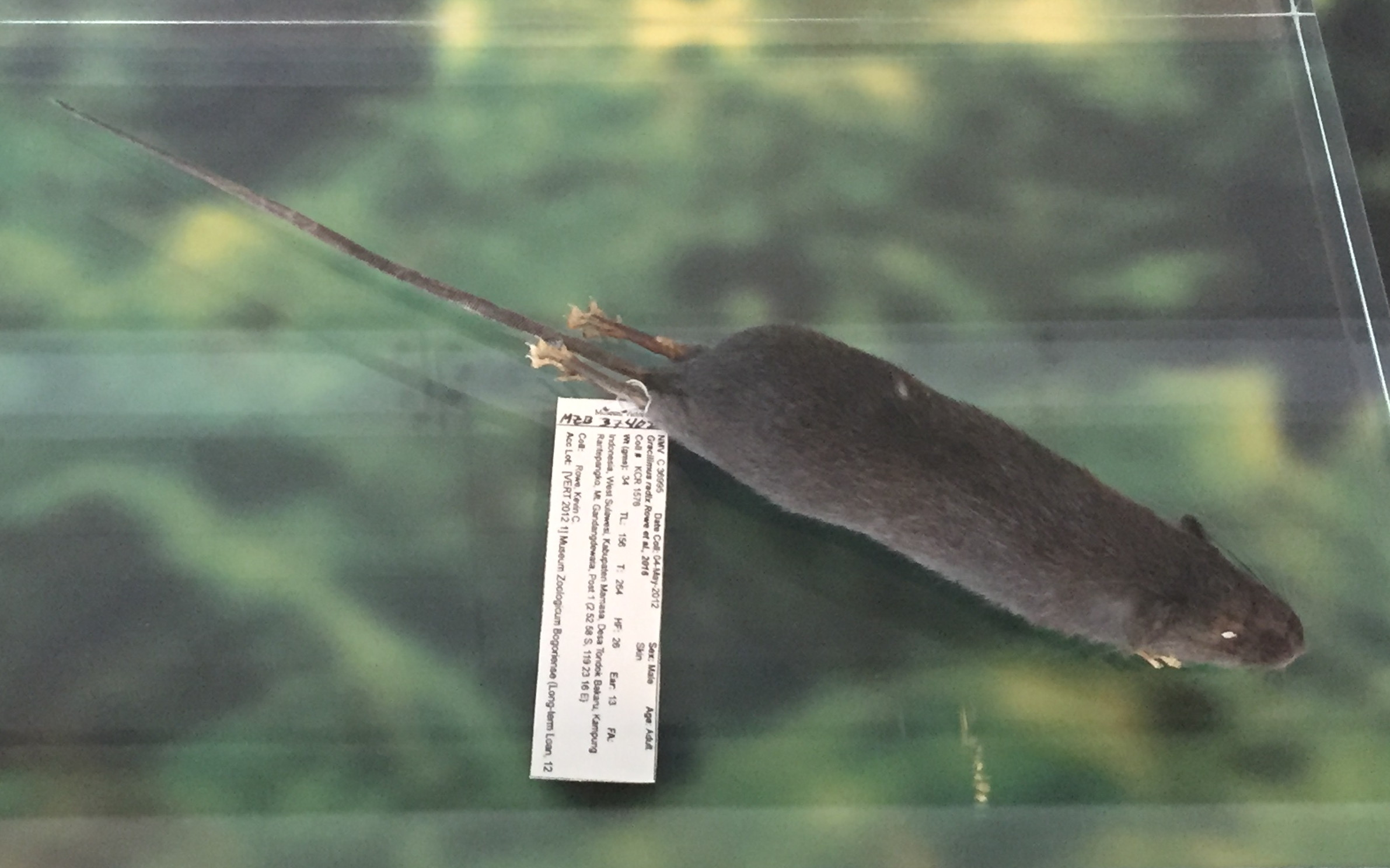

Conservation status
- Data Deficient (IUCN 3.1)

Scientific classification
- Kingdom: Animalia
- Phylum: Chordata
- Class: Mammalia
- Order: Rodentia
- Family: Muridae
- Tribe: Rattini
- Genus: Gracilimus; Rowe, Achmadi, & Esselstyn, 2016
- Species: G. radix

Binomial name
- Gracilimus radix Rowe, Achmadi, & Esselstyn, 2016

= Sulawesi root rat =

Species of rodent

The Sulawesi root rat, Gracilimus radix, is a species of rat in the family Muridae. It is a monotypic species, as it the only member of the genus Gracilimus. It is only known from the Mamasa Regency in Sulawesi, Indonesia, where it is endemic to the slopes of Mt. Gandangdewata in the Quarles Range, where it is found at an elevation of about 1600 m.

The closest relative of the slender rat is the Sulawesi water rat (Waiomys mamasae), and both belong in a clade of insectivorous rodents endemic to Sulawesi. The slender rat can be physically distinguished from other species by its slender body, soft gray-brown fur, small rounded ears, and long, sparsely haired tail. Unlike most other genera of Sulawesi rats, the slender rat feeds on both plant and animal matter, which may be a possible example of evolutionary reversal.
