= Gressitt's mosaic-tailed rat =

Conservation status
- Endangered (IUCN 3.1)

Scientific classification
- Kingdom: Animalia
- Phylum: Chordata
- Class: Mammalia
- Order: Rodentia
- Family: Muridae
- Genus: Paramelomys
- Species: P. gressitti

Binomial name
- Paramelomys gressitti (Menzies, 1996)

Species of rodent

Gressitt's mosaic-tailed rat (Paramelomys gressitti) is a species of rodent native to Papua New Guinea. Ongoing habitat degradation is a major threat. It is named after the collector, Judson Linsley Gressitt.
