= Eastern white-eared giant rat =

Conservation status
- Least Concern (IUCN 3.1)

Scientific classification
- Kingdom: Animalia
- Phylum: Chordata
- Class: Mammalia
- Order: Rodentia
- Family: Muridae
- Genus: Hyomys
- Species: H. goliath

Binomial name
- Hyomys goliath (Milne-Edwards, 1900)

Species of rodent

The eastern white-eared giant rat (Hyomys goliath) is a species of rodent in the family Muridae. It is found only in Papua New Guinea.

The species has been known to eat karuka nuts (Pandanus julianettii), and growers will put platforms or other obstacles on the trunks of the trees to keep the pests out.

== Names ==
It is known as mumuk in the Kalam language of Papua New Guinea.
