= Western white-eared giant rat =

Conservation status
- Data Deficient (IUCN 3.1)

Scientific classification
- Kingdom: Animalia
- Phylum: Chordata
- Class: Mammalia
- Order: Rodentia
- Family: Muridae
- Genus: Hyomys
- Species: H. dammermani

Binomial name
- Hyomys dammermani Stein, 1933

Species of rodent

The western white-eared giant rat (Hyomys dammermani) is a species of rodent in the family Muridae. It is found in West Papua, Indonesia and Papua New Guinea.
