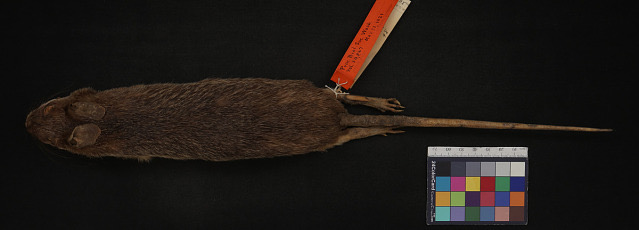

Conservation status
- Near Threatened (IUCN 3.1)

Scientific classification
- Kingdom: Animalia
- Phylum: Chordata
- Class: Mammalia
- Order: Rodentia
- Family: Muridae
- Genus: Echiothrix
- Species: E. centrosa

Binomial name
- Echiothrix centrosa Miller & Hollister, 1921
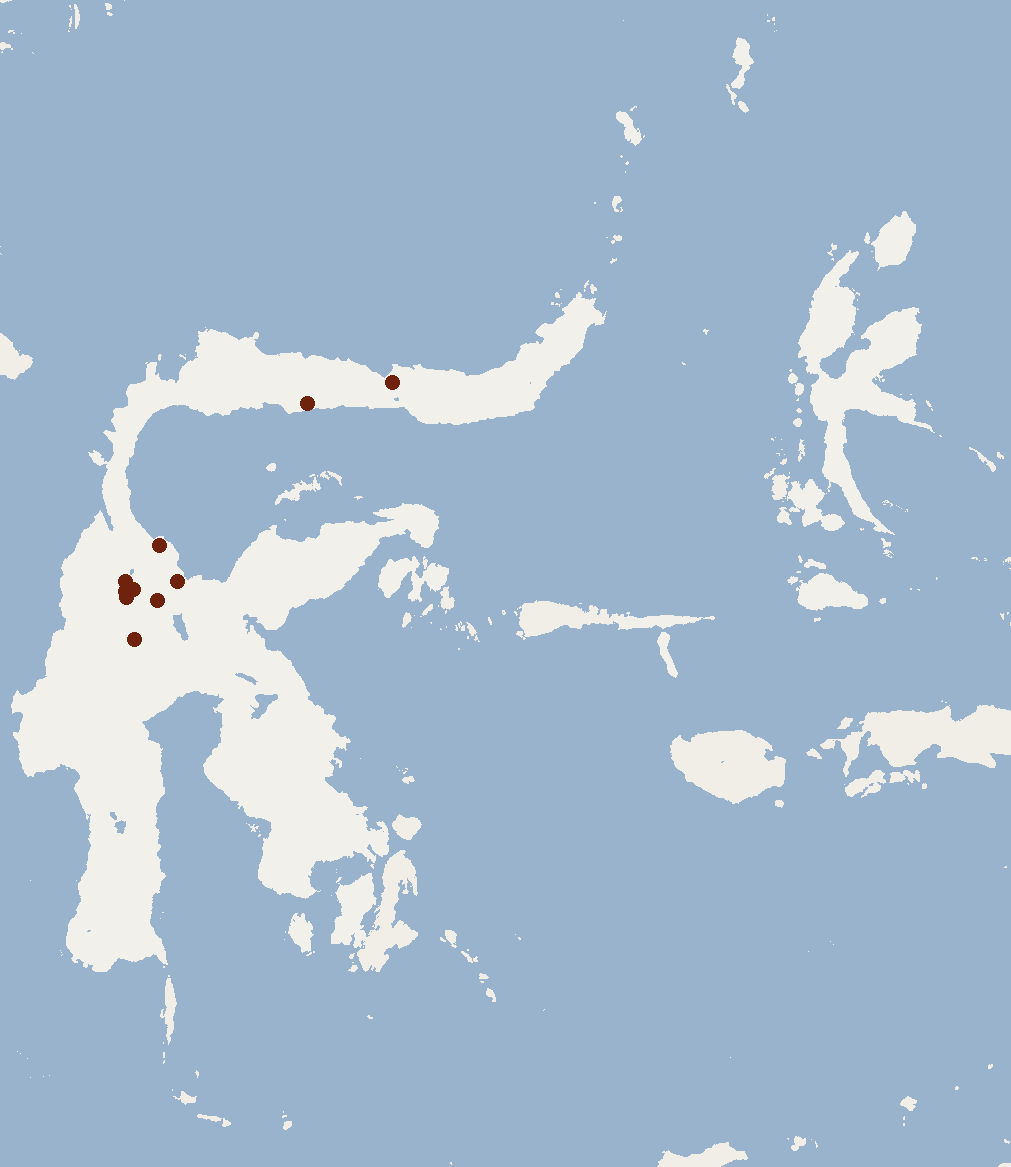

Synonyms
- Echiothrix brevicula

= Central Sulawesi echiothrix =

Species of rodent

The central Sulawesi echiothrix (Echiothrix centrosa) is a species of rodent in the family Muridae. It is found only in Sulawesi, Indonesia.
