= Sody's tree rat =

Conservation status
- Endangered (IUCN 3.1)

Scientific classification
- Kingdom: Animalia
- Phylum: Chordata
- Class: Mammalia
- Order: Rodentia
- Family: Muridae
- Subfamily: Murinae
- Tribe: Rattini
- Genus: Kadarsanomys; Musser, 1981
- Species: K. sodyi

Binomial name
- Kadarsanomys sodyi (Bartels, 1937)
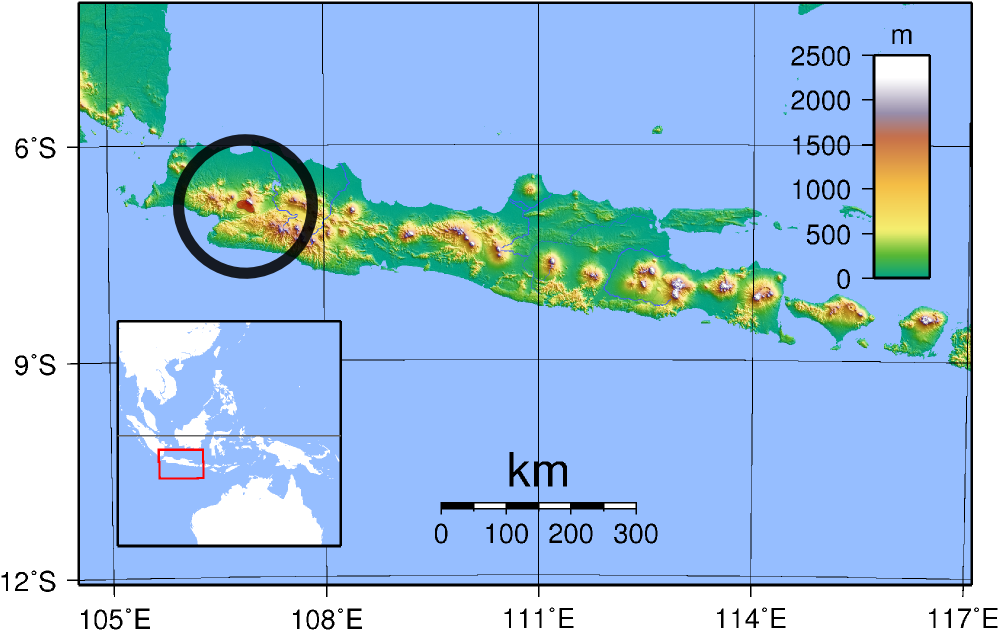
- Range of the Sody's tree rat

Species of rodent

Sody's tree rat (Kadarsanomys sodyi) is a rodent species in the family Muridae that has been recorded only in bamboo forest in Gunung Gede Pangrango National Park, West Java, Indonesia. It was first recorded during surveys carried out between 1933 and 1935 at an altitude of 1,000 m (3,300 ft). It is dark brown and has yellow to ochre spots. Its tail is uniform brown. Its head-to-body length ranges from 18 to 21 cm (7.1 to 8.3 in) with a 27 to 30.5 cm (10.6 to 12.0 in) long tail. Its long feet indicate that it is adapted to living in trees.
