= Potwarmus =

Potwarmus Temporal range: Miocene

Scientific classification
- Kingdom: Animalia
- Phylum: Chordata
- Class: Mammalia
- Order: Rodentia
- Family: Muridae
- Genus: †Potwarmus; Lindsey, 1988

Species
- Potwarmus primitivus Wessels et al., 1982; Potwarmus thailandicus Jaeger et al., 1985; Potwarmus flynni López Antoñanzas, 2009; Potwarmus mahmoodi Lindsay & Flynn, 2016

Extinct genus of murid rodent

Potwarmus is an extinct genus of murid rodent that lived in Asia and North Africa during the Miocene epoch.

== Taxonomy ==
The genus contains four species. The type species, Potwarmus primitivus, was described based on fossils found in the Chinji Formation of Pakistan and originally considered a species of Antemus before the genus Potwarmus was erected in 1988. The species Potwarmus thailandicus from Thailand was likewise classified under Antemus when it was described in 1985 prior to the erection of Potwarmus as a new genus. Potwarmus flynni, known from Middle Miocene Hofuf Formation of Saudi Arabia, was described in 2009. Potwarmus mahmoodi was described in 2016 based on fossils from the Zinda Pir Dome of western Pakistan. An undescribed species is known from Libya.

== Palaeobiology ==
=== Diet ===
The occlusal pattern of Potwarmus as derived from examining its hypsodonty index, topographic complexity index, and volumetric index suggests that it was a carnivore, specifically a predominantly insectivorous carnivore.
