= Wallace's large spiny rat =

Scientific classification
- Kingdom: Animalia
- Phylum: Chordata
- Class: Mammalia
- Order: Rodentia
- Family: Muridae
- Genus: Halmaheramys
- Species: H. wallacei

Binomial name
- Halmaheramys wallacei Fabre, Reeve, Fitriana, Aplin & Helgen, 2018

Species of rodent

The Wallace's large spiny rat (Halmaheramys wallacei) is a rodent found on the Obi Islands of Bisa and Obi in the Molucca archipelago of Indonesia.

The genus Halmaheramys was originally thought to include only one species, endemic to Halmahera, giving the genus its scientific name. This new species extends the distribution to two more islands in the Maluku Archipelago.

It was first found in January 1990 by researchers T. Flannery and Boeadi, when they found a badly decomposed body of a rat on the island of Bisa. Later, in 2013, the authors collected further three specimens from Obi Island.
