= Moncton's mosaic-tailed rat =

Conservation status
- Least Concern (IUCN 3.1)

Scientific classification
- Kingdom: Animalia
- Phylum: Chordata
- Class: Mammalia
- Order: Rodentia
- Family: Muridae
- Genus: Paramelomys
- Species: P. moncktoni

Binomial name
- Paramelomys moncktoni (Thomas, 1904)

Species of rodent

Moncton's mosaic-tailed rat (Paramelomys moncktoni, previously known as Melomys moncktoni) is a species of rodent in the family Muridae.

It is found only in Papua New Guinea.

The species lives in lowlands in the north-east and south-east portion of the country. It lives in tropical moist forests. It is found as high as 700 m.

While much of the habitat where it lives is being damaged, it survives well in disturbed areas, and as a result is considered at low risk of extinction.
