= Greater tree mouse =

Conservation status
- Least Concern (IUCN 3.1)

Scientific classification
- Kingdom: Animalia
- Phylum: Chordata
- Class: Mammalia
- Order: Rodentia
- Family: Muridae
- Genus: Chiruromys
- Species: C. forbesi

Binomial name
- Chiruromys forbesi Thomas, 1888

Species of rodent

The greater tree mouse (Chiruromys forbesi) is a species of rodent in the family Muridae. It is found only in Papua New Guinea.
