= Thomas's mosaic-tailed rat =

Conservation status
- Least Concern (IUCN 3.1)

Scientific classification
- Kingdom: Animalia
- Phylum: Chordata
- Class: Mammalia
- Order: Rodentia
- Family: Muridae
- Genus: Paramelomys
- Species: P. mollis

Binomial name
- Paramelomys mollis (Thomas, 1913)

Species of rodent

Thomas's mosaic-tailed rat (Paramelomys mollis) is a species of rodent in the family Muridae. It is found in West Papua, Indonesia and Papua New Guinea.
