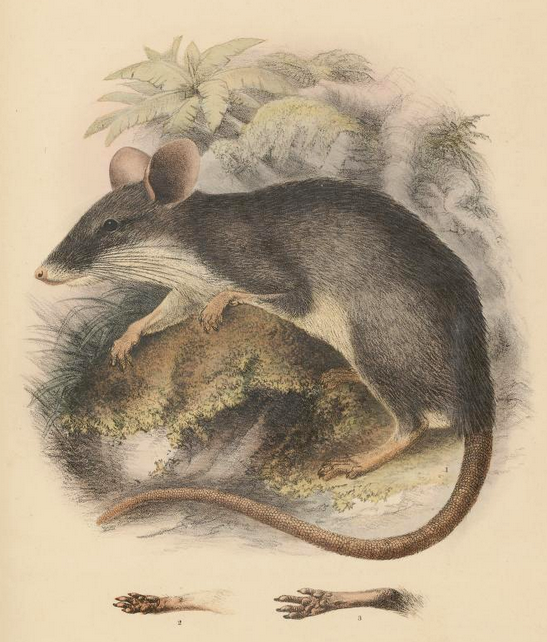

Conservation status
- Endangered (IUCN 3.1)

Scientific classification
- Kingdom: Animalia
- Phylum: Chordata
- Class: Mammalia
- Order: Rodentia
- Family: Muridae
- Genus: Echiothrix
- Species: E. leucura

Binomial name
- Echiothrix leucura Gray, 1867
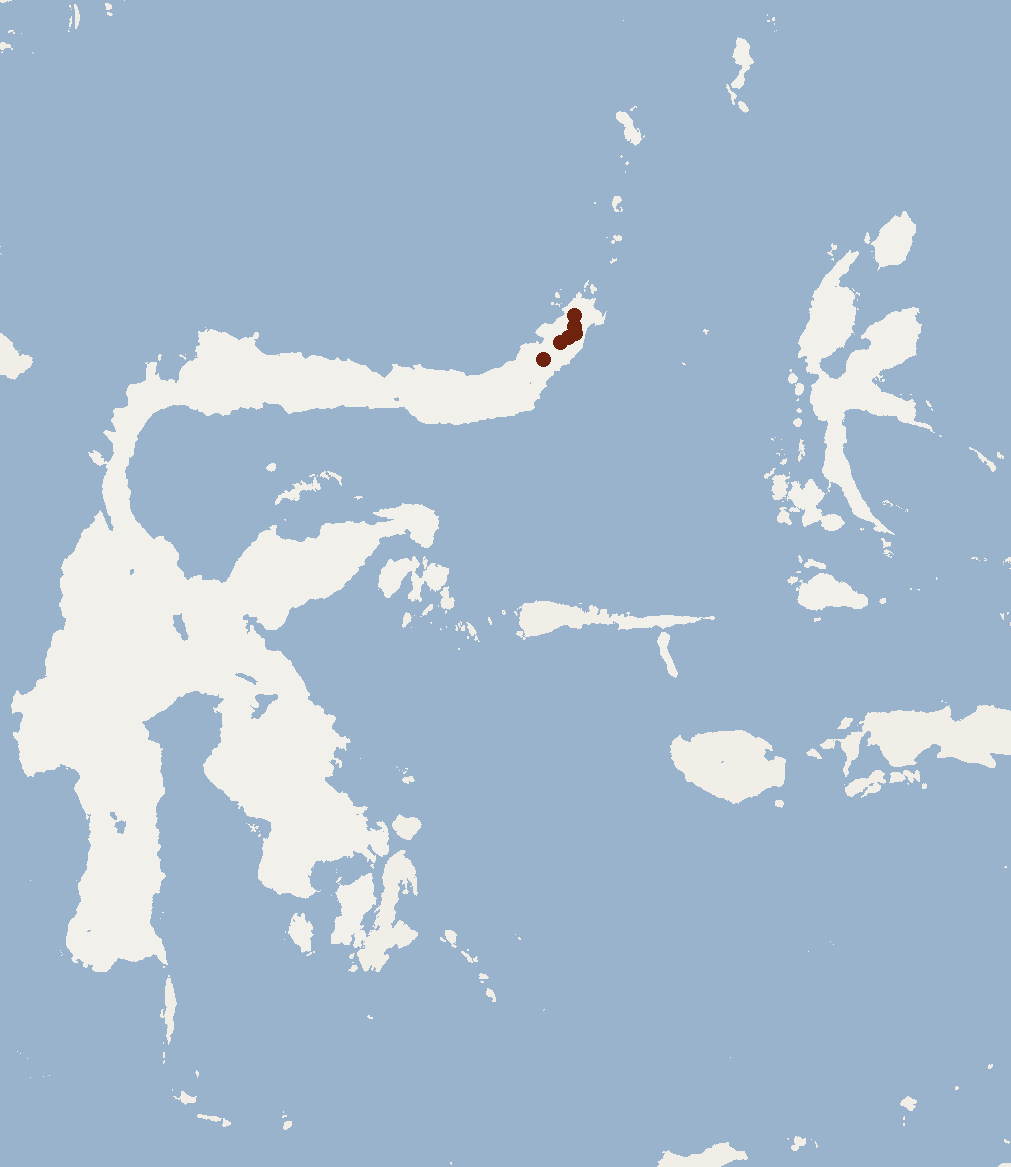

= Northern Sulawesi echiothrix =

Species of rodent

The Northern Sulawesi echiothrix or Sulawesi spiny rat (Echiothrix leucura) is a species of rodent in the family Muridae. It is endemic to northeastern Sulawesi, Indonesia.
