= Lesser tree mouse =

Conservation status
- Least Concern (IUCN 3.1)

Scientific classification
- Kingdom: Animalia
- Phylum: Chordata
- Class: Mammalia
- Order: Rodentia
- Family: Muridae
- Genus: Chiruromys
- Species: C. vates

Binomial name
- Chiruromys vates (Thomas, 1908)

Species of rodent

The lesser tree mouse (Chiruromys vates) is a species of rodent in the family Muridae found only in Papua New Guinea.
