= Ohiya rat =

Conservation status
- Vulnerable (IUCN 3.1)

Scientific classification
- Kingdom: Animalia
- Phylum: Chordata
- Class: Mammalia
- Order: Rodentia
- Family: Muridae
- Subfamily: Murinae
- Tribe: Rattini
- Genus: Srilankamys; Musser, 1981
- Species: S. ohiensis

Binomial name
- Srilankamys ohiensis (Phillips, 1929)
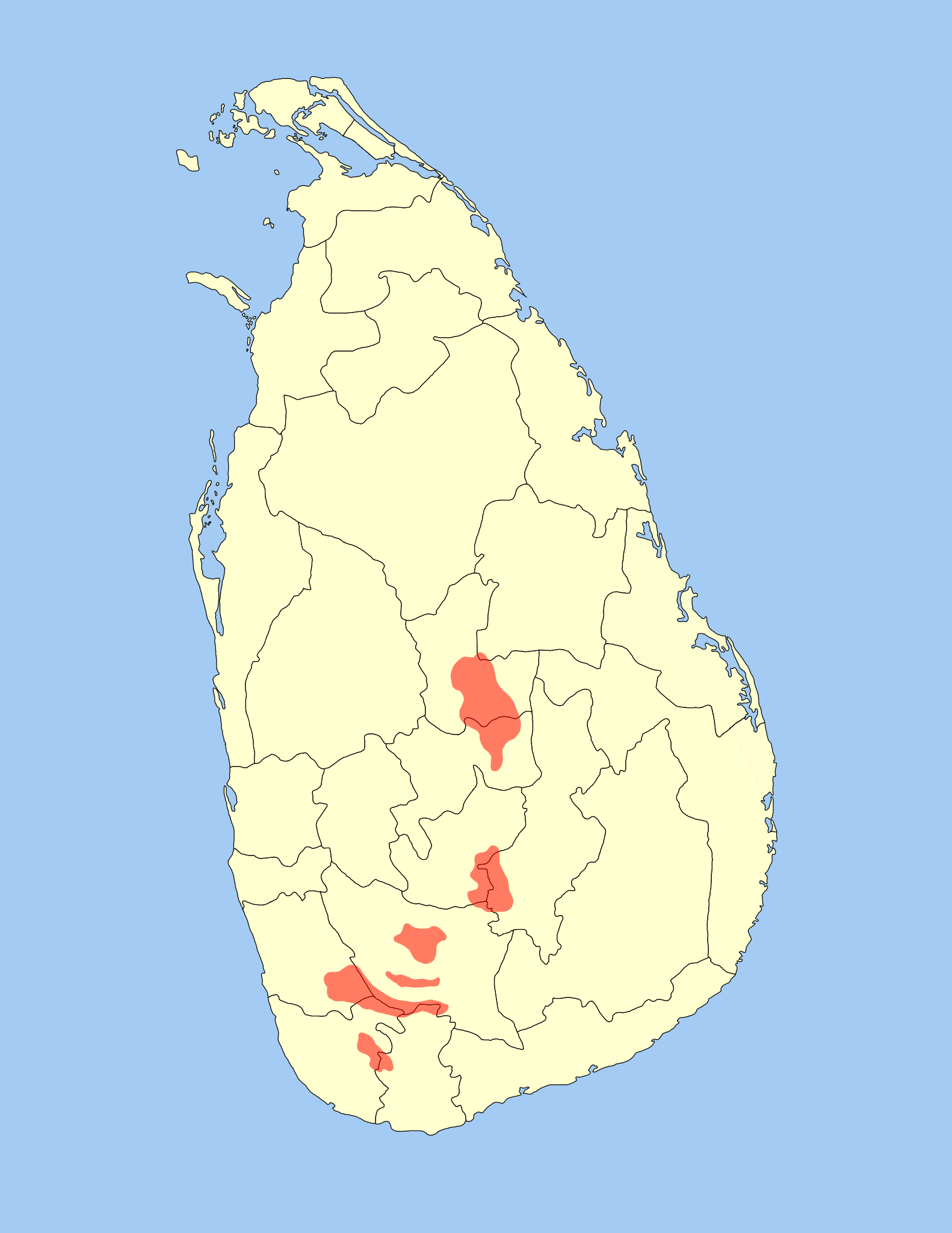

Species of rodent

The Ohiya rat (Srilankamys ohiensis), or Sri Lanka bi-colored rat, is a species of rodent in the family Muridae. It is the only species in the genus Srilankamys. It is found only in Sri Lanka where it is known locally as ශ්‍රී ලංකා දෙපැහැ මීයා in Sinhala.

== Description ==
Head and body length is 15–18 cm. Tail is 19–21 cm. Steel gray above grading to pale yellowish gray on the sides. Underparts pure white. Tail distinctive. Dusky purple above, white below, the tip white all round. Head relatively large. Large ears pink inside. Eyes small, almond-shaped. Pinkish muzzle. Light-colored feet.
