= Verschuren's swamp rat =

Conservation status
- Data Deficient (IUCN 3.1)

Scientific classification
- Kingdom: Animalia
- Phylum: Chordata
- Class: Mammalia
- Order: Rodentia
- Family: Muridae
- Genus: Congomys
- Species: C. verschureni

Binomial name
- Congomys verschureni (Verheyen & Van der Straeten, 1977)

Synonyms
- Malacomys verschureni Verheyen & Van der Straeten, 1977; Praomys verschureni (Verheyen & Van der Straeten, 1977)

Species of rodent

Verschuren's swamp rat (Congomys verschureni) is a species of rodent in the family Muridae. It is found only in Democratic Republic of the Congo. Its natural habitat is subtropical or tropical moist lowland forests. It is threatened by habitat loss.
