= Progonomys =

Progonomys Temporal range: Miocene

Scientific classification
- Kingdom: Animalia
- Phylum: Chordata
- Class: Mammalia
- Order: Rodentia
- Family: Muridae
- Genus: †Progonomys; Schaub, 1938

Type species
- Progonomys cathalai Schaub, 1938

Other species
- Progonomys hispanicus Van der Weerd, 1976 Progonomys orientalis Schaub, 1938 Progonomys woelferi Bachmayer and Wilson, 1970

Extinct genus of murid rodent

Progonomys is an extinct genus of murid rodent that lived in Africa and Eurasia during the Miocene epoch.

== Description ==
Progonomys clauzoni possesses a first mandibular molar with no anterocentral cusp, alternating positions of labial and longitudinal cusp rows, and a symmetric anteroconid.

== Palaeobiology ==
=== Palaeoecology ===
Because cf. Progonomys from Tortonian deposits in the Siwalik Hills lacked modified radial enamel in its incisors, it is believed to have eaten a diet composed of leaves, flowers, seeds, fleshy roots, and insects.
