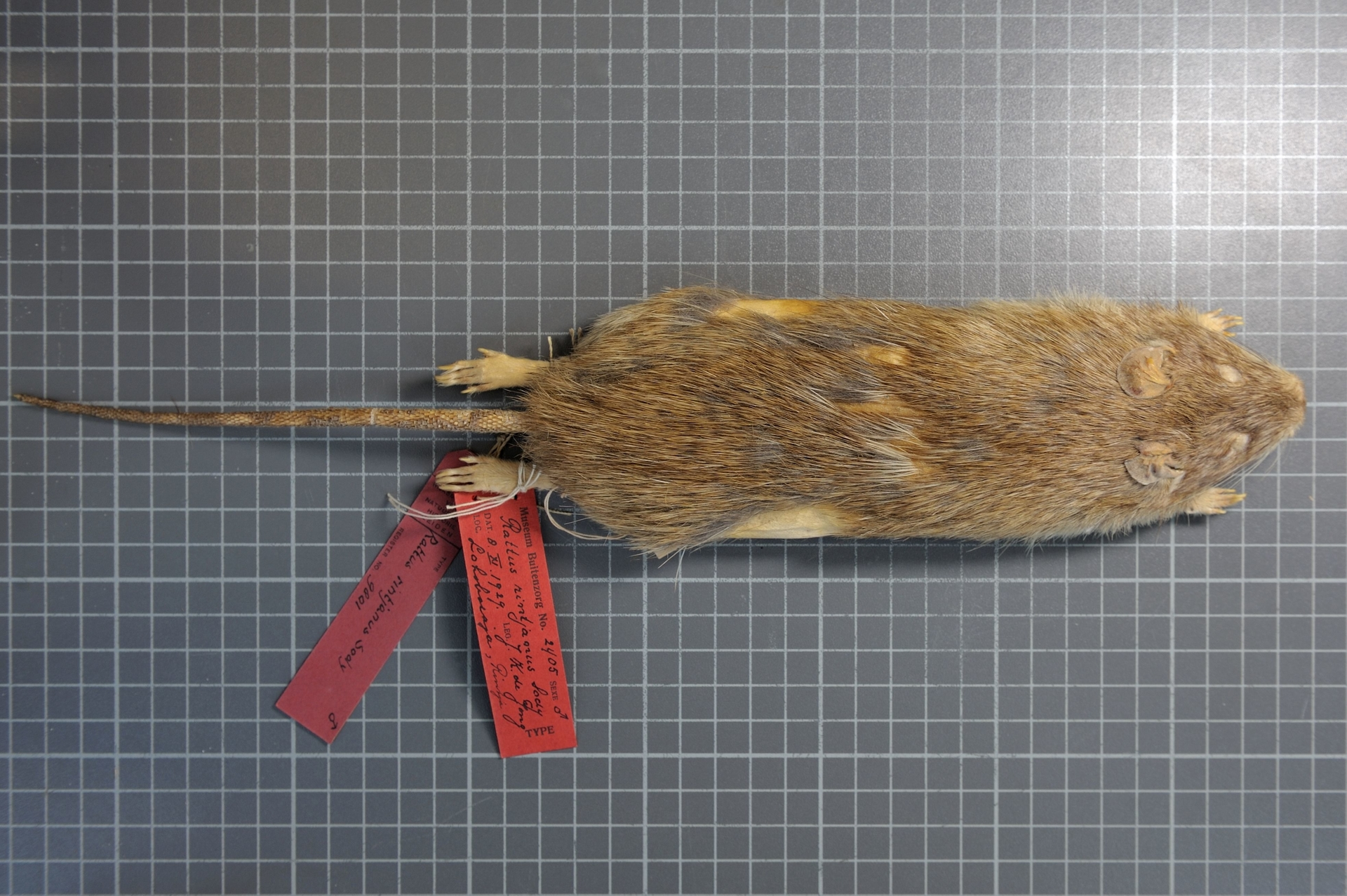

Conservation status
- Vulnerable (IUCN 3.1)

Scientific classification
- Kingdom: Animalia
- Phylum: Chordata
- Class: Mammalia
- Order: Rodentia
- Family: Muridae
- Tribe: Rattini
- Genus: Komodomys; Musser & Boeadi, 1980
- Species: K. rintjanus

Binomial name
- Komodomys rintjanus (Sody, 1941)

= Komodo rat =

Species of rodent

The Komodo rat (Komodomys rintjanus) is a species of rodent in the family Muridae endemic to the surrounding islands of Flores in Indonesia (including Komodo, Lembata, and Pantar), and formerly Flores itself. Its natural habitat is subtropical or tropical dry forests.It is threatened by habitat loss. It is thought to prefer open habitats. It has a body mass of around 100–200 grams (0.22–0.44 lb).
