= Tateomys =

Scientific classification
- Domain: Eukaryota
- Kingdom: Animalia
- Phylum: Chordata
- Class: Mammalia
- Order: Rodentia
- Family: Muridae
- Subfamily: Murinae
- Tribe: Rattini
- Genus: Tateomys; Musser, 1969

Type species
- Tateomys rhinogradoides

Species
- Tateomys macrocercus Tateomys rhinogradoides

Genus of rodents

Tateomys is a genus of rodent from Sulawesi. Both species have been classified as vulnerable by IUCN. It includes the following species:

- Long-tailed shrew rat – Tateomys macrocercus Musser, 1982
- Tate's shrew rat – Tateomys rhinogradoides Musser, 1969
