= Congomys =

Scientific classification
- Kingdom: Animalia
- Phylum: Chordata
- Class: Mammalia
- Order: Rodentia
- Family: Muridae
- Tribe: Praomyini
- Genus: Congomys; Nicolas et al., 2021

Species
- C. lukolelae C. verschureni

Rodent endemic in the DRC

Congomys is a genus of rodent in the family Muridae. Both species in this genus were formerly classified in Praomys, and both are endemic to the Democratic Republic of Congo.

The two species in this genus are:

- Lukolela swamp rat, Congomys lukolelae
- Verschuren's swamp rat, Congomys verschureni
