= Mountain mosaic-tailed rat =

Conservation status
- Least Concern (IUCN 3.1)

Scientific classification
- Domain: Eukaryota
- Kingdom: Animalia
- Phylum: Chordata
- Class: Mammalia
- Order: Rodentia
- Family: Muridae
- Genus: Paramelomys
- Species: P. rubex

Binomial name
- Paramelomys rubex (Thomas, 1922)

Species of rodent

The mountain mosaic-tailed rat (Paramelomys rubex) is a species of rodent in the family Muridae. It is found in West Papua, Indonesia and Papua New Guinea.
