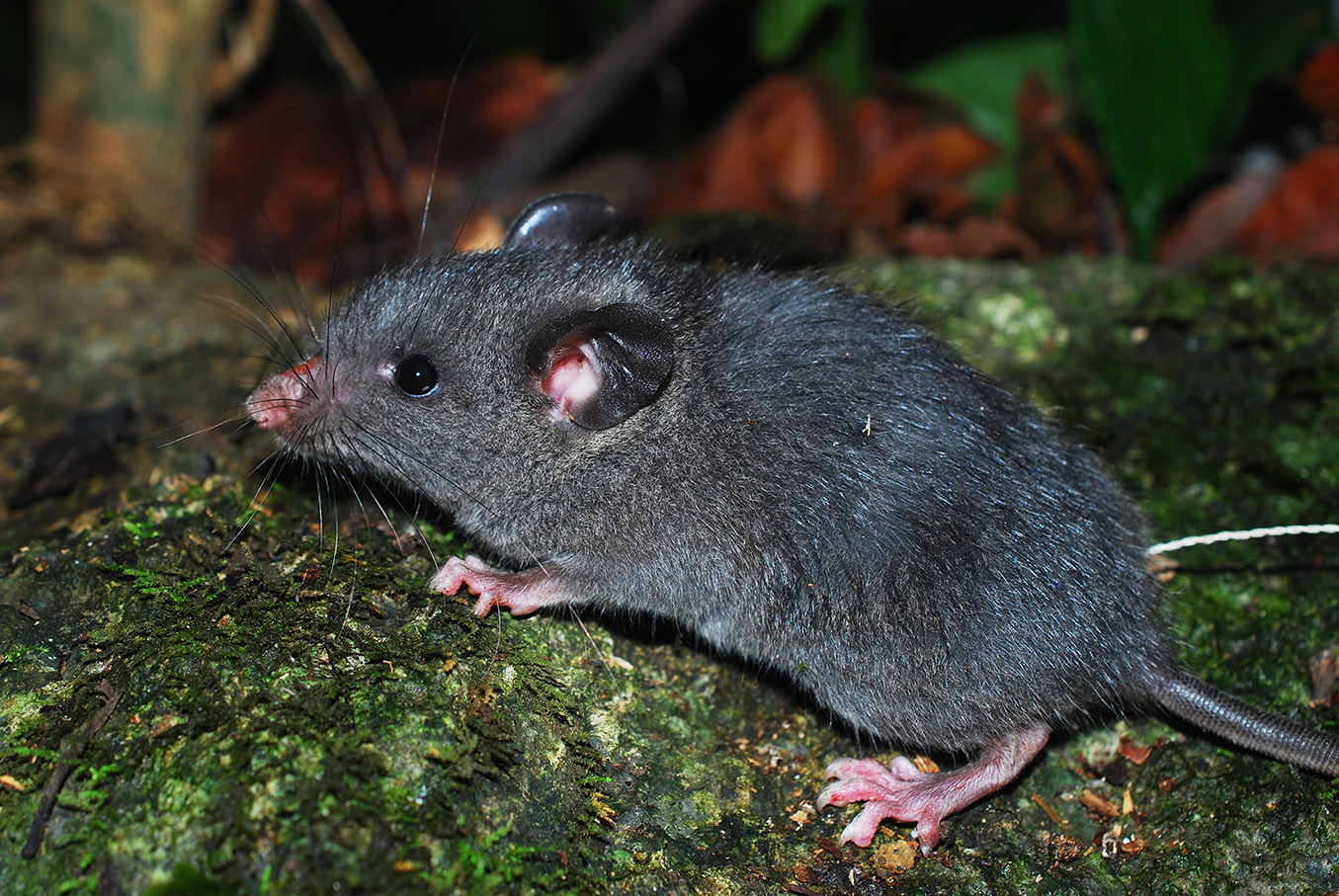

Conservation status
- Data Deficient (IUCN 3.1)

Scientific classification
- Kingdom: Animalia
- Phylum: Chordata
- Class: Mammalia
- Order: Rodentia
- Family: Muridae
- Tribe: Rattini
- Genus: Saxatilomys; Musser, 2005
- Species: S. paulinae

Binomial name
- Saxatilomys paulinae Musser, Smith, Robinson & Lunde, 2005
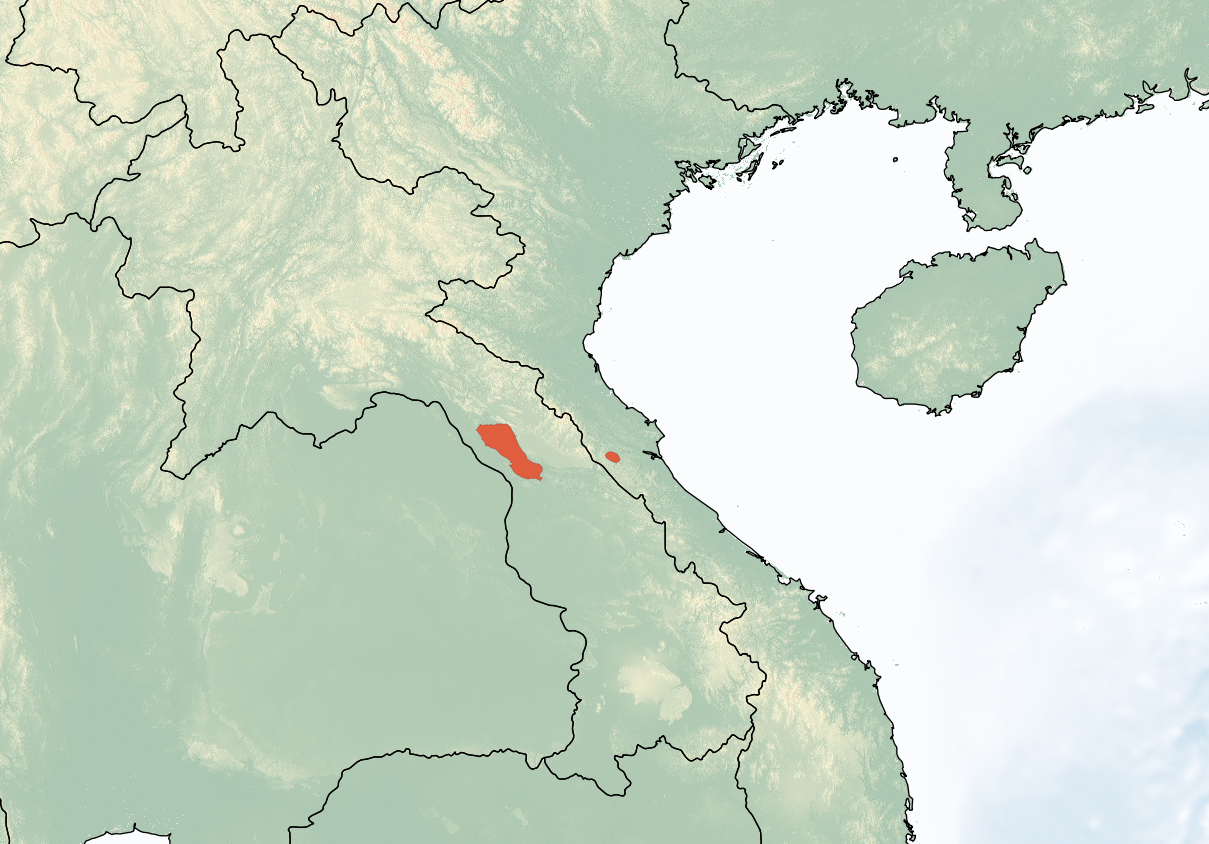

= Saxatilomys =

Genus of rodents

Saxatilomys paulinae, Paulina's limestone rat, is a species of murid rodent native to central Laos and Vietnam, separated to a monotypic genus Saxatilomys. It was first discovered in the Khammouan Limestone National Biodiversity Conservation Area in Khammouan Province, Laos, and also been found in the Vietnamese province of Quang Bình. It is the only known species in the genus Saxatilomys. The genus name is derived from the Latin saxatilis, meaning "among the rocks" and the Greek mys, meaning mouse or rat.

== Description ==
It resembles, and is likely closely related to, species in the genera Niviventer and Chiromyscus. Saxatilomys is distinguished from these and other Indomalayan genera by "semispinous dark gray upperparts, dark frosted gray underparts, large, extremely bulbous footpads, and a combination of derived and primitive cranial and dental traits".

== Habitat ==
It is thought to be petricolous and has only been observed in forested, rocky limestone habitats.
