= White-eared giant rat =

White-eared giant rat Temporal range: Pleistocene to Recent

Scientific classification
- Kingdom: Animalia
- Phylum: Chordata
- Class: Mammalia
- Order: Rodentia
- Family: Muridae
- Tribe: Hydromyini
- Genus: Hyomys; Thomas, 1904

Type species
- Hyomys meeki

Species
- See text.

Genus of rodents

The white-eared giant rats, genus Hyomys, are a group of Old World rats from New Guinea.

== Description ==
These large rodents belong to the genus Hyomys, with head and body lengths between 295–390 mm (11.6–15.4 in), tail lengths between 256–381 mm (10.1–15.0 in), and a weight of up to 945 g (33.3 oz).

== Species ==
Genus Hyomys - white-eared giant rats

- Western white-eared giant rat, Hyomys dammermani Stein, 1933
- Eastern white-eared giant rat, Hyomys goliath Milne-Edwards, 1900
