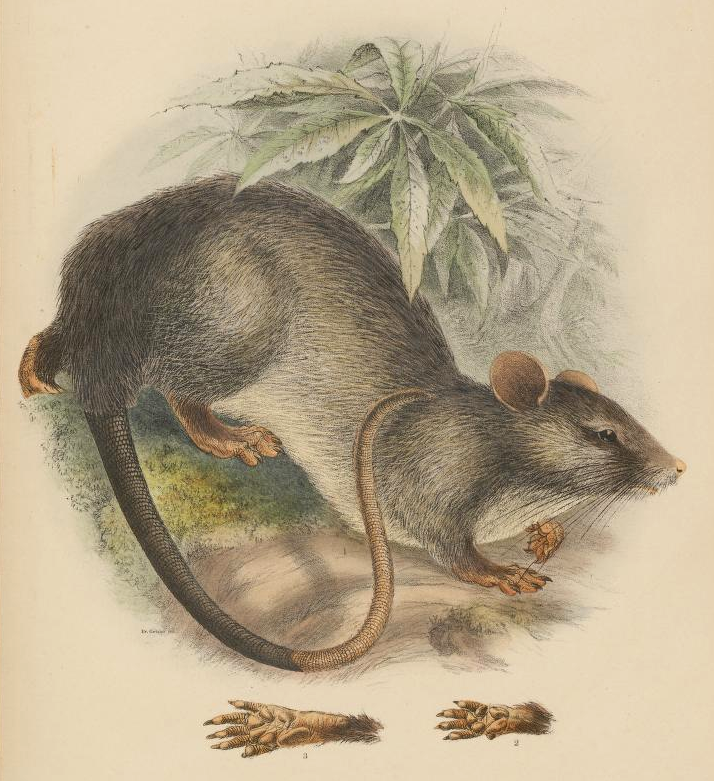
- Illustration by Adolf Bernhard Meyer

Conservation status
- Least Concern (IUCN 3.1)

Scientific classification
- Kingdom: Animalia
- Phylum: Chordata
- Class: Mammalia
- Order: Rodentia
- Family: Muridae
- Genus: Lenomys
- Species: L. meyeri

Binomial name
- Lenomys meyeri (Jentink, 1879)

= Trefoil-toothed giant rat =

Species of rodent

The trefoil-toothed giant rat (Lenomys meyeri) is a species of rodent in the family Muridae. It is found only in Sulawesi, Indonesia, where it is located throughout the island.
