= Sulawesi soft-furred rat =

Conservation status
- Least Concern (IUCN 3.1)

Scientific classification
- Kingdom: Animalia
- Phylum: Chordata
- Class: Mammalia
- Order: Rodentia
- Family: Muridae
- Subfamily: Murinae
- Tribe: Rattini
- Genus: Eropeplus; Miller & Hollister, 1921
- Species: E. canus

Binomial name
- Eropeplus canus Miller & Hollister, 1921

Species of rodent

The Sulawesi soft-furred rat (Eropeplus canus) is a species of rodent in the family Muridae. It is the only species in the genus Eropeplus. It is found only in Sulawesi, Indonesia. Its natural habitat is subtropical or tropical dry forest. It is threatened by habitat loss.
