= Paramelomys =

Scientific classification
- Kingdom: Animalia
- Phylum: Chordata
- Class: Mammalia
- Order: Rodentia
- Family: Muridae
- Tribe: Hydromyini
- Genus: Paramelomys; Rümmler, 1936

Type species
- Uromys levipes

Genus of rodents

Paramelomys is a genus of rodent. All of the nine species of the genus are found in West Papua, Indonesia and Papua New Guinea.

== Species ==
- Paramelomys gressitti
- Paramelomys levipes
- Paramelomys lorentzii
- Paramelomys mollis
- Paramelomys moncktoni
- Paramelomys naso
- Paramelomys platyops
- Paramelomys rubex
- Paramelomys steini
