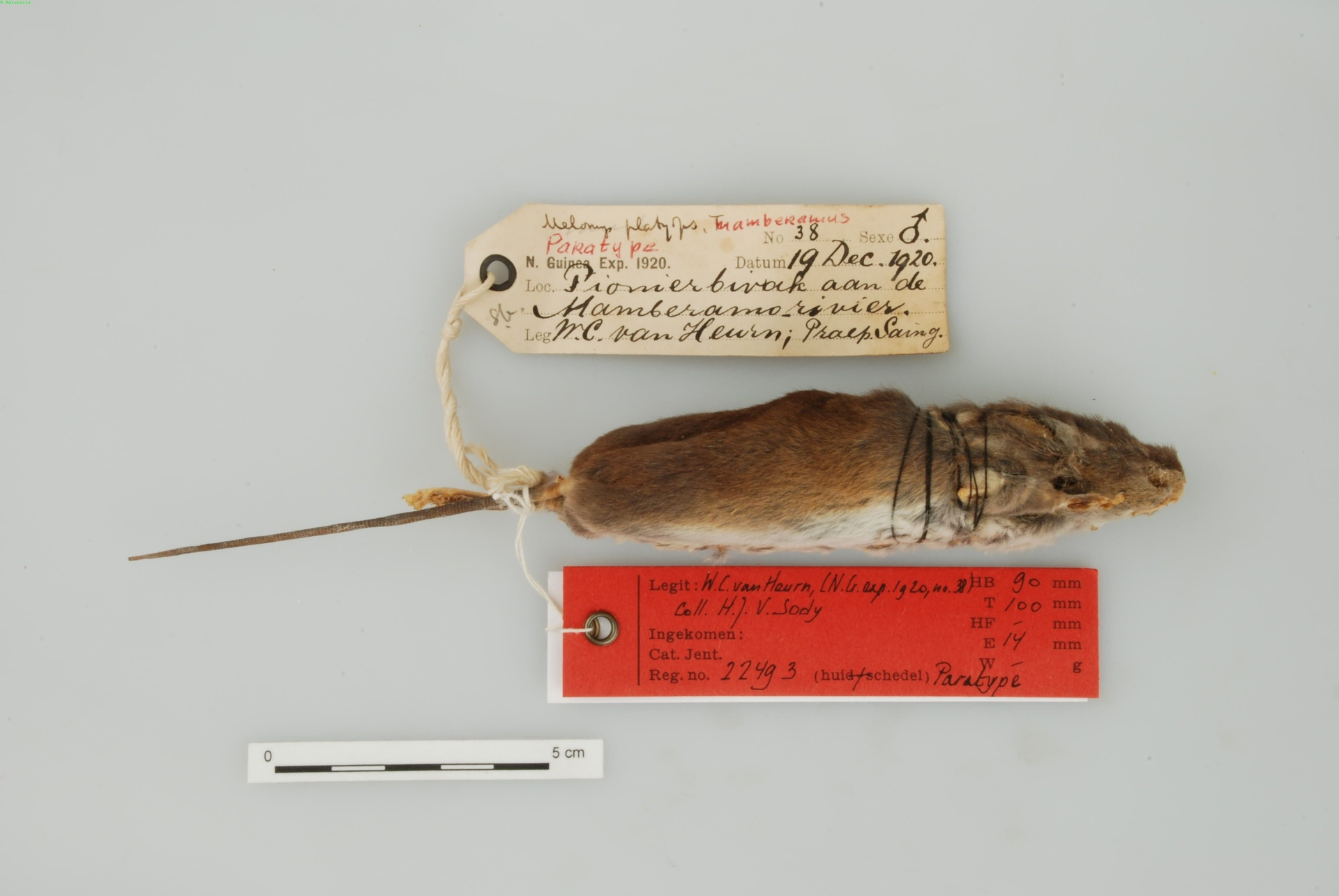

Conservation status
- Least Concern (IUCN 3.1)

Scientific classification
- Kingdom: Animalia
- Phylum: Chordata
- Class: Mammalia
- Infraclass: Placentalia
- Order: Rodentia
- Family: Muridae
- Genus: Paramelomys
- Species: P. platyops

Binomial name
- Paramelomys platyops (Thomas, 1906)

= Lowland mosaic-tailed rat =

Species of rodent

The lowland mosaic-tailed rat (Paramelomys platyops) is a species of rodent in the family Muridae. It is found in Indonesia and Papua New Guinea.
