= Halmaheramys =

Scientific classification
- Kingdom: Animalia
- Phylum: Chordata
- Class: Mammalia
- Order: Rodentia
- Family: Muridae
- Tribe: Rattini
- Genus: Halmaheramys; Fabre, Pagès, Musser, Fitriana, Semiadi & Helgen 2013

Species
- Halmaheramys bokimekot Halmaheramys wallacei

Genus of rodents

Halmaheramys is a genus of rodent in the family Muridae endemic to the Moluccas, Indonesia.

It contains the following species:

- Spiny Boki Mekot rat (Halmaheramys bokimekot)
- Wallace's large spiny rat (Halmaheramys wallacei)
