= Short-haired water rat =

Conservation status
- Data Deficient (IUCN 3.1)

Scientific classification
- Kingdom: Animalia
- Phylum: Chordata
- Class: Mammalia
- Order: Rodentia
- Family: Muridae
- Genus: Paraleptomys
- Species: P. wilhelmina

Binomial name
- Paraleptomys wilhelmina Tate & Archbold, 1941
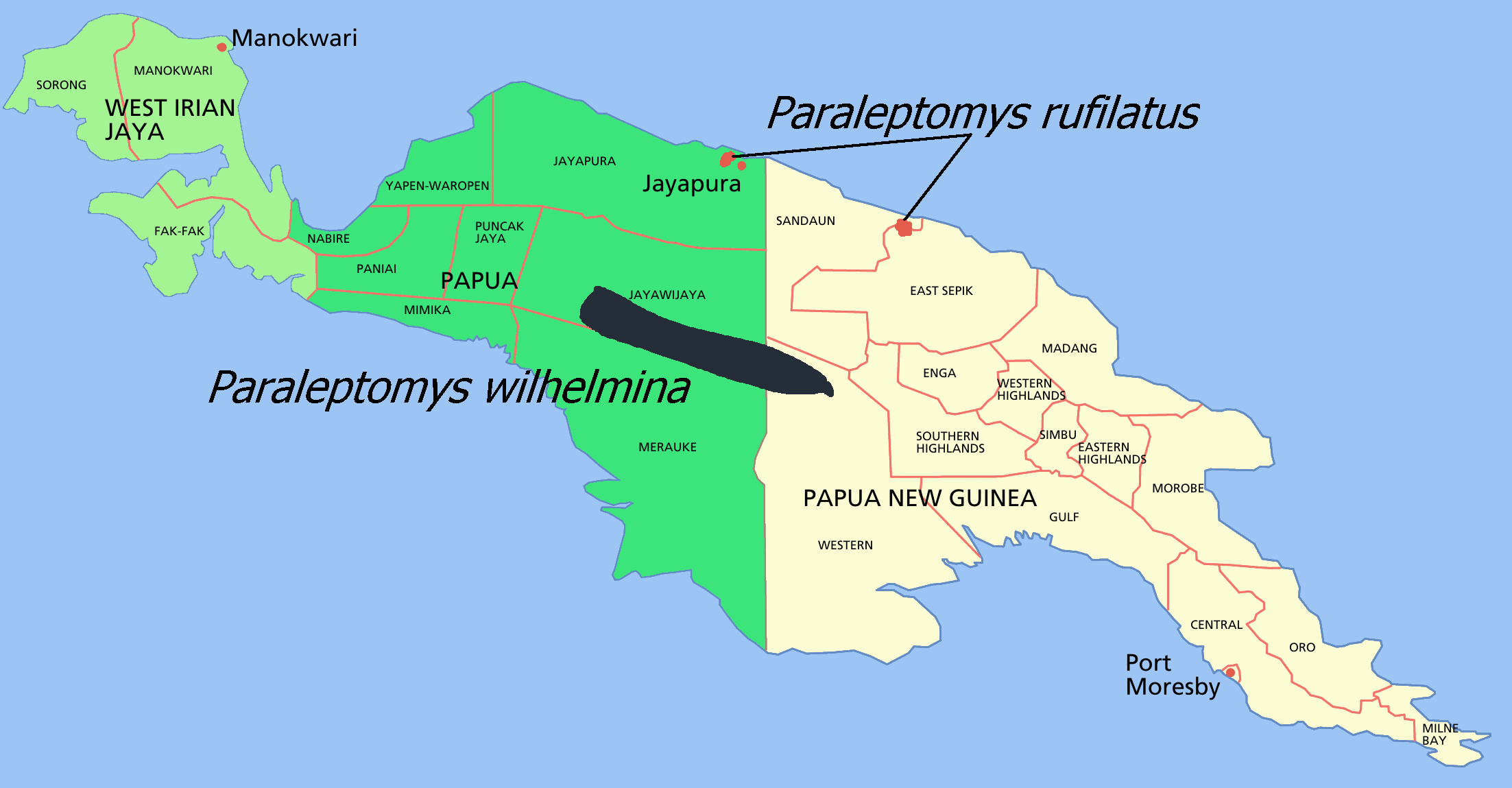
- Distribution map on New Guinea. P. wilhelmina is in black.

Species of rodent

The short-haired water rat (Paraleptomys wilhelmina) is a species of rodent in the family Muridae. It is found in West Papua, Indonesia and Papua New Guinea. There are two currently undescribed species allied with this taxon.
