= Tate's shrew rat =

Conservation status
- Data Deficient (IUCN 3.1)

Scientific classification
- Kingdom: Animalia
- Phylum: Chordata
- Class: Mammalia
- Order: Rodentia
- Family: Muridae
- Genus: Tateomys
- Species: T. rhinogradoides

Binomial name
- Tateomys rhinogradoides Musser, 1969
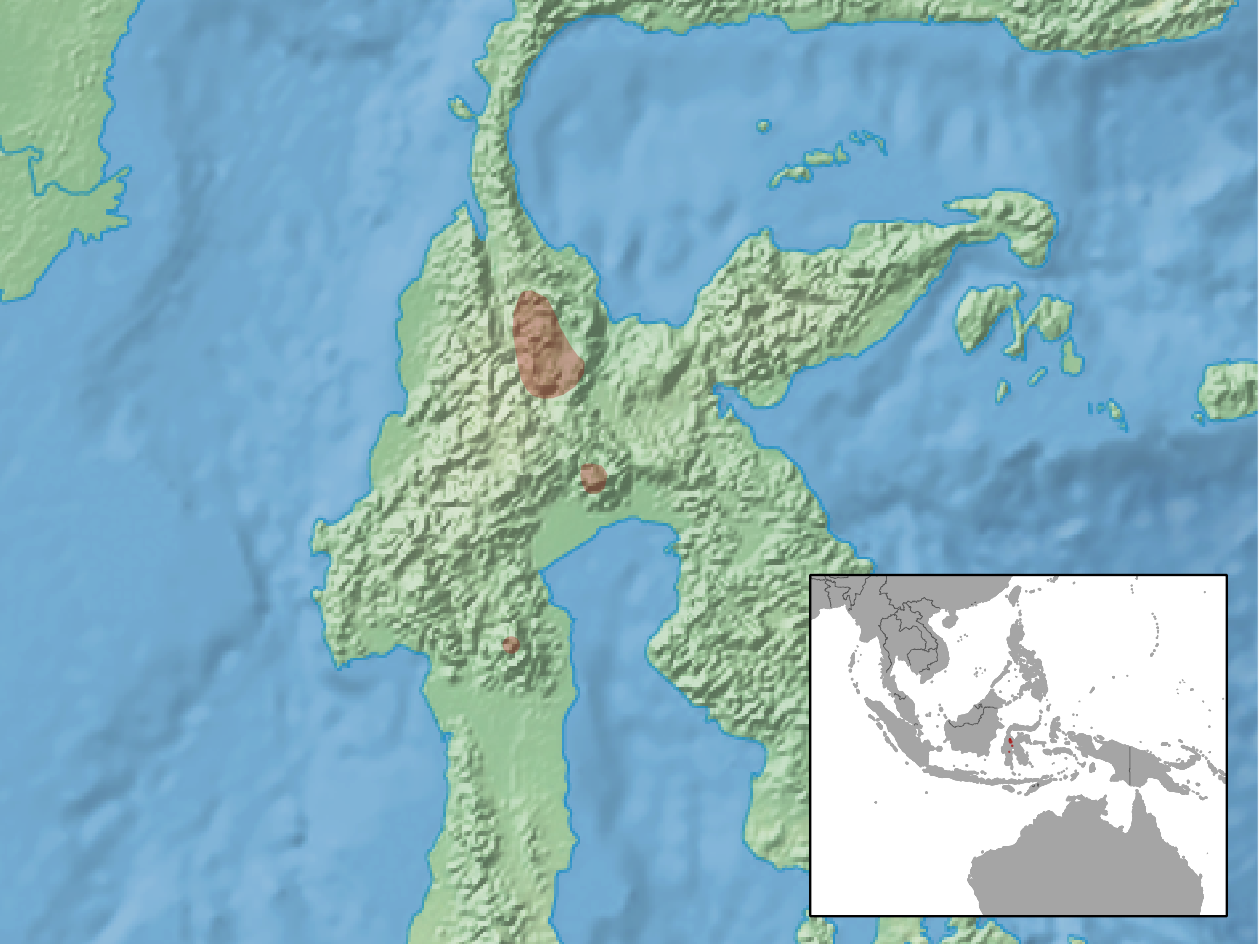

Species of rodent

Tate's shrew rat (Tateomys rhinogradoides) is a species of rodent in the family Muridae. It is found only in central Sulawesi, Indonesia, where it has been recorded on Mount Latimodjong (Mount Rantemario), Mount Tokala, and Mount Nokilalaki. The species is named after American zoologist George Henry Hamilton Tate.
