= Sulawesian shrew rat =

Conservation status
- Data Deficient (IUCN 3.1)

Scientific classification
- Kingdom: Animalia
- Phylum: Chordata
- Class: Mammalia
- Order: Rodentia
- Family: Muridae
- Subfamily: Murinae
- Tribe: Rattini
- Genus: Melasmothrix; Miller & Hollister, 1921
- Species: M. naso

Binomial name
- Melasmothrix naso Miller & Hollister, 1921

Species of rodent

The Sulawesian shrew rat (Melasmothrix naso) is a species of rodent in the family Muridae. It is the only species in the genus Melasmothrix. It is found only in central Sulawesi, Indonesia, and is known from the localities of Rano Rano and Mount Nokilalaki.

These small-bodied rodents live at high altitudes, reaching up to 7500 feet, specifically in places that maintain wet, cool conditions like moss forests.
