= Waiomys =

Conservation status
- Data Deficient (IUCN 3.1)

Scientific classification
- Kingdom: Animalia
- Phylum: Chordata
- Class: Mammalia
- Order: Rodentia
- Family: Muridae
- Tribe: Rattini
- Genus: Waiomys; Rowe, Achmadi & Esselstyn, 2014
- Species: W. mamasae

Binomial name
- Waiomys mamasae Rowe, Achmadi & Esselstyn, 2014

Genus of rodents

Waiomys is a genus of rodents from the family Muridae. It is endemic to Sulawesi, Indonesia. The genus is monotypic, consisting of the species Waiomys mamasae (Sulawesi water rat). It is known only from Mount Gandangdewata, Mamasa Regency, West Sulawesi.
