= Antemus =

Antemus Temporal range: Miocene

Scientific classification
- Kingdom: Animalia
- Phylum: Chordata
- Class: Mammalia
- Infraclass: Placentalia
- Order: Rodentia
- Family: Muridae
- Genus: †Antemus; Jacobs, 1977
- Species: †A. chinjiensis

Binomial name
- †Antemus chinjiensis Jacobs, 1977

Extinct genus of rodents

Antemus is an extinct genus of murid rodent that lived in South Asia during the Miocene epoch.

== Distribution ==
Antemus chinjiensis is known from the Siwalik Hills of Pakistan.
