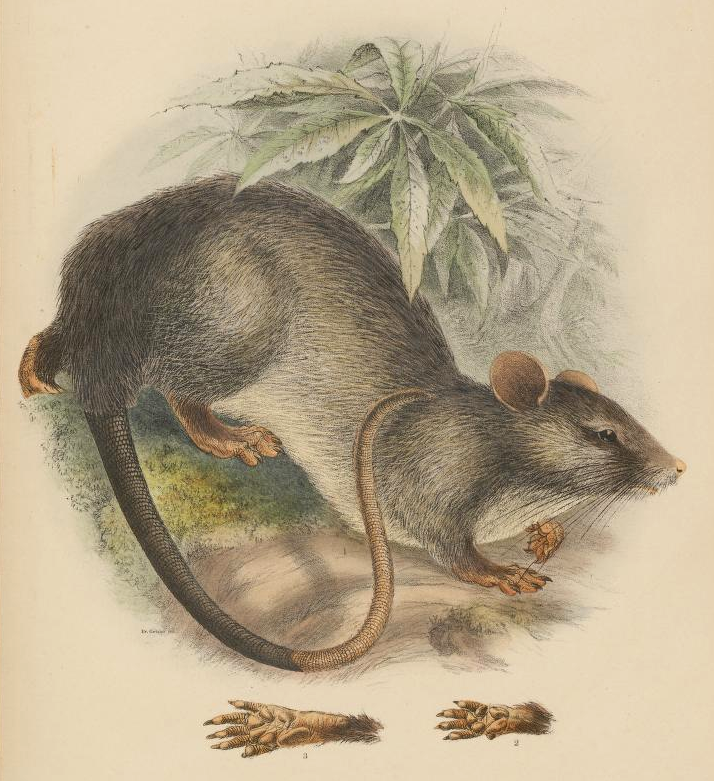
- Trefoil-toothed giant rat (Lenomys meyeri)

Scientific classification
- Domain: Eukaryota
- Kingdom: Animalia
- Phylum: Chordata
- Class: Mammalia
- Order: Rodentia
- Family: Muridae
- Tribe: Rattini
- Genus: Lenomys; Thomas, 1898

Species
- Lenomys meyeri; †Lenomys grovesi

= Lenomys =

Genus of rodent

Lenomys is a genus of rodent endemic to Sulawesi. It contains the living trefoil-toothed giant rat (Lenomys meyeri) and the extinct Lenomys grovesi.
