= Long-tailed shrew rat =

Conservation status
- Data Deficient (IUCN 3.1)

Scientific classification
- Kingdom: Animalia
- Phylum: Chordata
- Class: Mammalia
- Order: Rodentia
- Family: Muridae
- Genus: Tateomys
- Species: T. macrocercus

Binomial name
- Tateomys macrocercus Musser, 1982
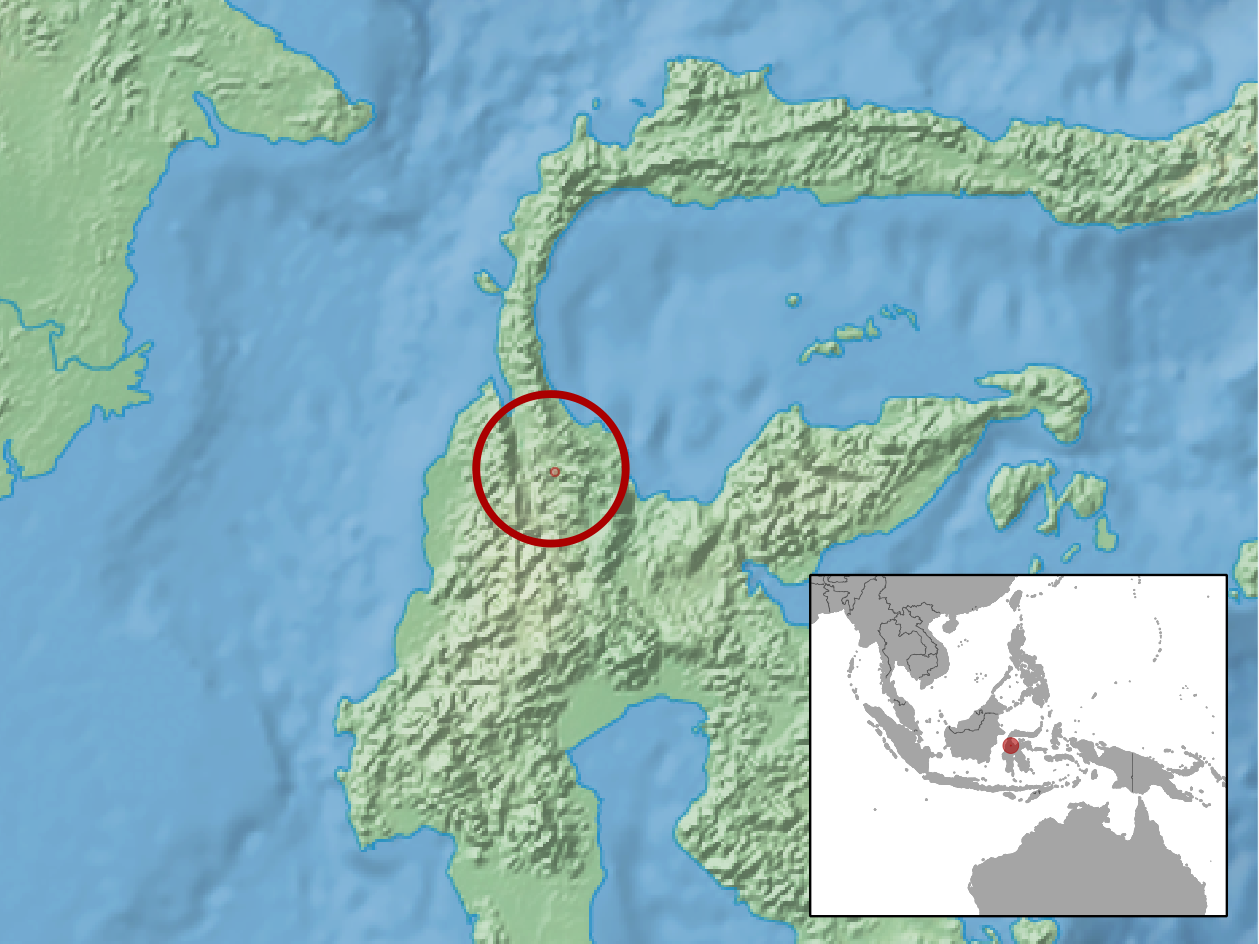

Species of rodent

The long-tailed shrew rat (Tateomys macrocercus) is a species of rodent in the family Muridae. It is found only in Central Sulawesi, Indonesia, where it is known only from Mount Nokilalaki in Sigi Regency.
