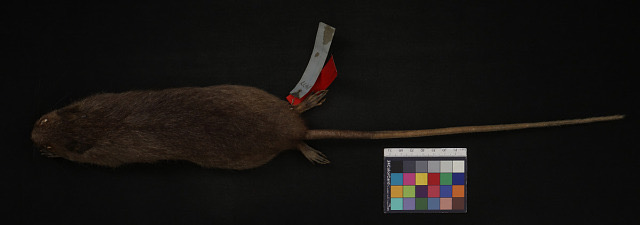

Conservation status
- Least Concern (IUCN 3.1)

Scientific classification
- Kingdom: Animalia
- Phylum: Chordata
- Class: Mammalia
- Order: Rodentia
- Family: Muridae
- Tribe: Rattini
- Genus: Lenothrix; Miller, 1903
- Species: L. canus

Binomial name
- Lenothrix canus Miller, 1903

= Gray tree rat =

Species of rodent

The gray tree rat (Lenothrix canus) is a species of rodent in the family Muridae. It is the only species in the genus Lenothrix. It is found in forests in Indonesia and Malaysia. A common species, the IUCN has rated it as being of "least concern".

== Taxonomy ==
The gray tree rat was first described by the American zoologist Gerrit Smith Miller Jr. as Lenothrix canus in 1903. Molecular data suggests that it is closely related to the white-bellied rats Niviventer, but is widely diverged from Maxomys, and its phylogenetic affinities are unclear. It has many primitive morphological, cranial and dental features and may have diverged from the core murine lineage at an early stage.

== Description ==
Head-and-body length is 165 to 220 mm (6 to 9 in) and tail length is 190 to 270 mm (7 to 11 in). The fur is dense and woolly and free from spines. The head and back are grayish brown or gray and the underparts are white or buffish white. The tail is dark at the base and white near the tip. The hind feet are broad and have claws on all the digits.(

== Distribution ==
The species is native to Indonesia and Malaysia. Its range includes peninsular Malaysia, Penang Island and Tuangku Island, and the states of Sabah, Sarawak and Kalimantan in Borneo. That it has not been recorded from Brunei is probably the result of insufficient sampling rather than its absence from that state. It is an arboreal rodent, inhabiting all kinds of wooded habitats at altitudes of up to 550 m (1,800 ft).

== Ecology ==
The gray tree rat is nocturnal and spends most of its time in trees and bushes, feeding mainly on fruit.

== Status ==
L. canus is a common species, tolerant of disturbance to its habitat and able to live in secondary forest and rubber plantations. It is present in several protected areas including Gunung Palung National Park and Mount Kinabalu National Park. No particular threats have been recognised and the International Union for Conservation of Nature has assessed its conservation status as being of "least concern".
