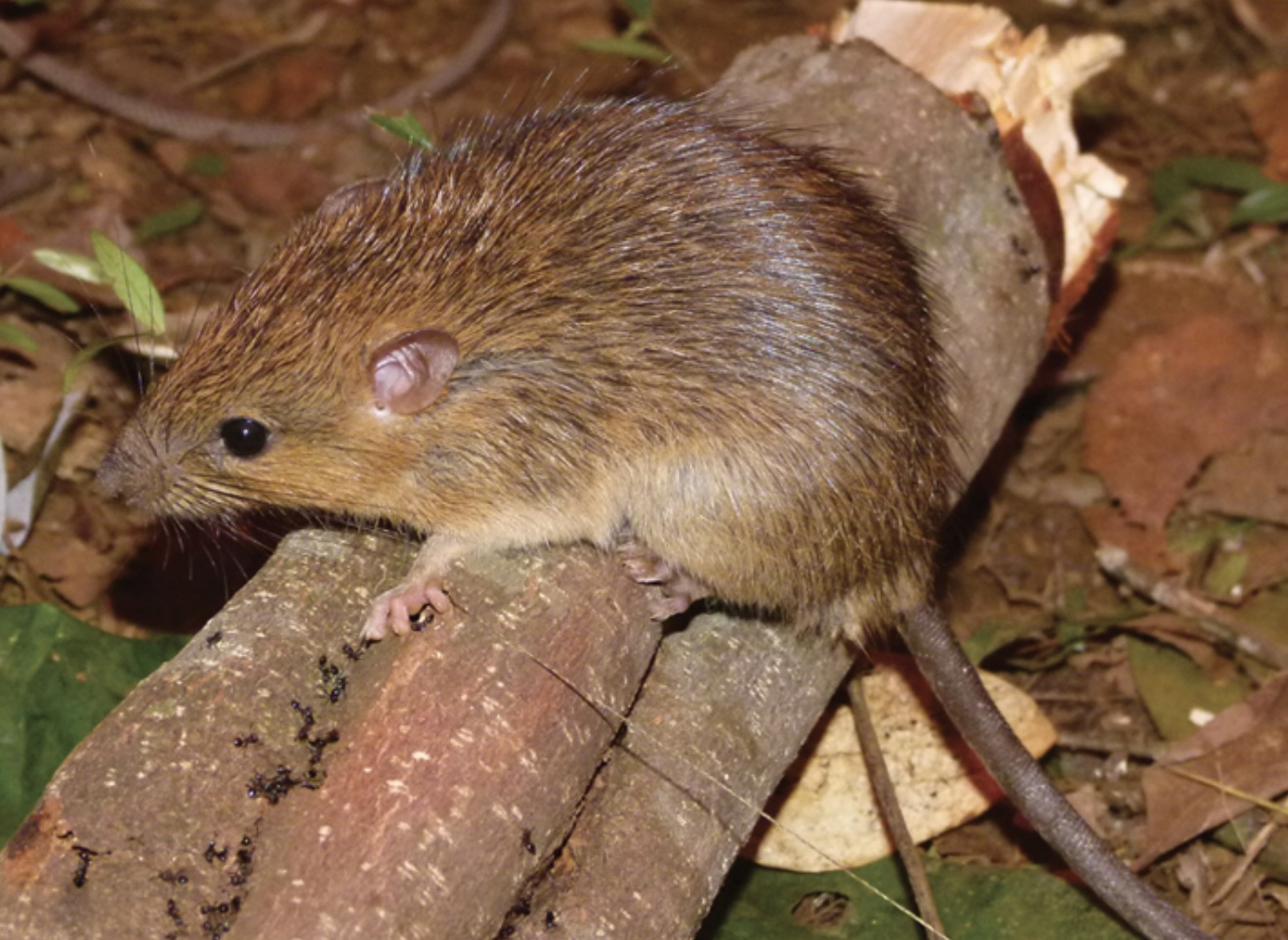

Conservation status
- Least Concern (IUCN 3.1)

Scientific classification
- Kingdom: Animalia
- Phylum: Chordata
- Class: Mammalia
- Order: Rodentia
- Family: Muridae
- Subfamily: Murinae
- Tribe: Rattini
- Genus: Chiromyscus; Thomas, 1925
- Species: C. chiropus

Binomial name
- Chiromyscus chiropus (Thomas, 1891)
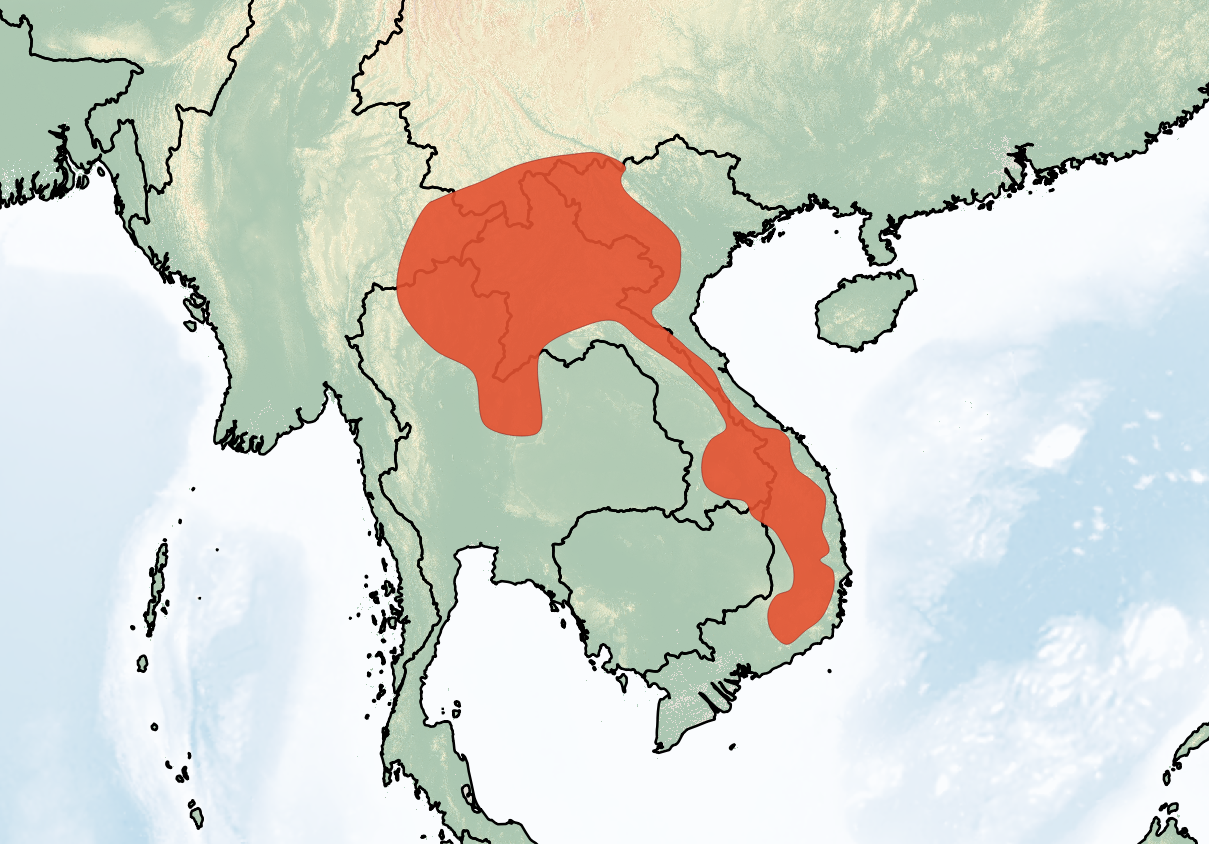

= Fea's tree rat =

Species of rodent

Fea's tree rat (Chiromyscus chiropus) or the Indochinese chiromyscus, is a species of rodent in the family Muridae. It is found in Yunnan (China), eastern Myanmar, northern Thailand, Laos, and Vietnam.
