= Long-nosed mosaic-tailed rat =

Conservation status
- Least Concern (IUCN 3.1)

Scientific classification
- Kingdom: Animalia
- Phylum: Chordata
- Class: Mammalia
- Order: Rodentia
- Family: Muridae
- Genus: Paramelomys
- Species: P. levipes

Binomial name
- Paramelomys levipes (Thomas, 1897)

Species of rodent

The long-nosed mosaic-tailed rat or Papuan lowland paramelomys (Paramelomys levipes) is a species of rodent in the family Muridae. It is found only in Papua New Guinea.
