= Sulawesi giant rat =

Sulawesi giant rat Temporal range: Late Pliocene – Recent

Conservation status
- Least Concern (IUCN 3.1)

Scientific classification
- Kingdom: Animalia
- Phylum: Chordata
- Class: Mammalia
- Order: Rodentia
- Family: Muridae
- Tribe: Rattini
- Genus: Taeromys
- Species: T. dominator

Binomial name
- Taeromys dominator (Thomas, 1921)

Synonyms
- frosti (Ellerman, 1949); ursinus (Sody, 1941)

Species of rodent

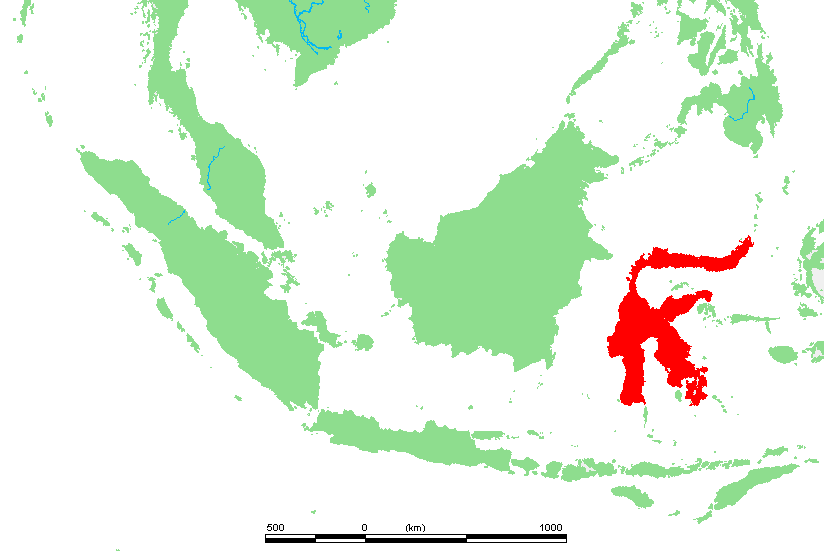
Location of Sulawesi

The Sulawesi giant rat (Taeromys dominator) is a species of rodent in the family Muridae. The species is endemic to Sulawesi in Indonesia, where it inhabits forests at elevations from sea level to the tree line. It is frugivorous and semiarboreal. While not currently listed as threatened, it is impacted by both habitat destruction and subsistence hunting. In 2021, it was transferred from the monotypic genus Paruromys back to Taeromys, where it was previously placed by Henry Jacob Victor Sody in 1941.
