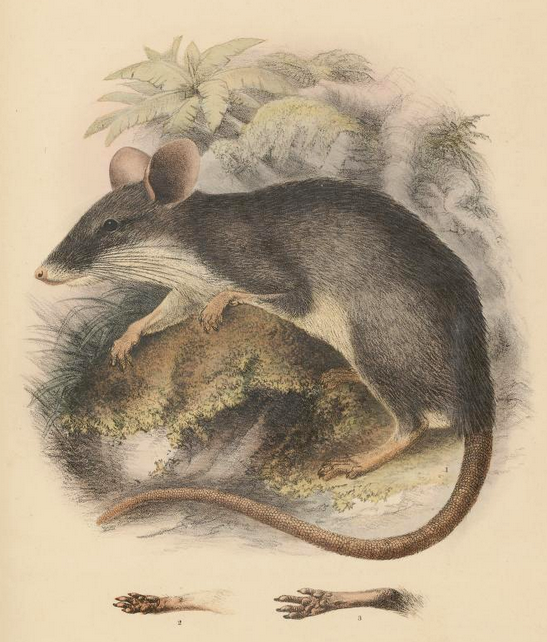
- Northern Sulawesi echiothrix (Echiothrix leucura)

Scientific classification
- Domain: Eukaryota
- Kingdom: Animalia
- Phylum: Chordata
- Class: Mammalia
- Order: Rodentia
- Family: Muridae
- Tribe: Rattini
- Genus: Echiothrix; Gray, 1867

Type species
- Echiothrix leucura

Species
- Echiothrix centrosa Echiothrix leucura

= Echiothrix =

Echiothrix Temporal range: Pliocene - Recent

Genus of rodents

Echiothrix is a genus of rodent in the family Muridae endemic to Sulawesi, Indonesia. It contains the following species:

- Central Sulawesi echiothrix (Echiothrix centrosa)
- Northern Sulawesi echiothrix (Echiothrix leucura)
