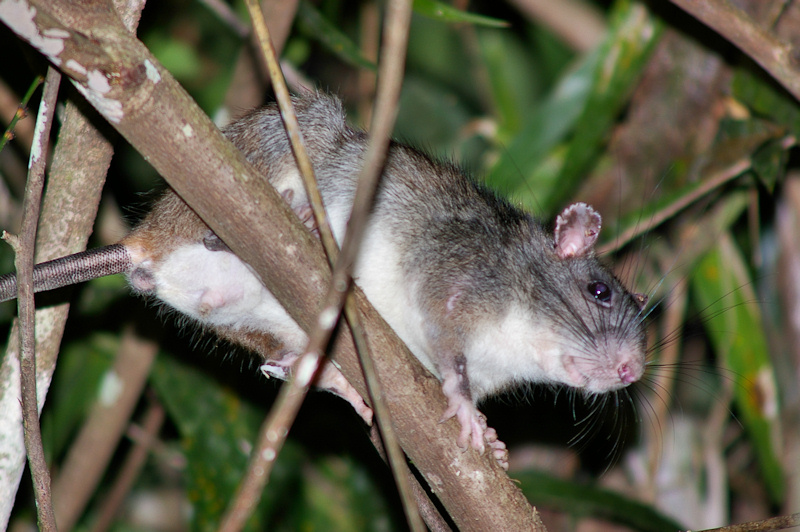
- Giant white-tailed rat (Uromys caudimaculatus)

Scientific classification
- Kingdom: Animalia
- Phylum: Chordata
- Class: Mammalia
- Infraclass: Placentalia
- Order: Rodentia
- Family: Muridae
- Subfamily: Murinae
- Tribe: Hydromyini; Gray, 1825

Genera
- See text

Synonyms
- Chiropodomyini Pagès et al. 2015

= Hydromyini =

Hydromyini Temporal range: Early Pliocene - Recent

Tribe of rodents

Hydromyini is a very large, diverse tribe of muroid rodents in the subfamily Murinae. They are the dominant native rodents in Australasia and one of only two native rodent groups there, the other being the R. fuscipes group of the genus Rattus in the tribe Rattini. They are also found in parts of Southeast Asia.

== Taxonomy ==
They are thought to be relatively early offshoots from the Murinae, with only Rattini and Phloeomyini being more basal than them. They likely colonized New Guinea (then a part of Sahul) from either the Sunda Shelf or the Philippines during the late Miocene or early Pliocene, about 5 million years ago, and diversified extremely rapidly. From here, they colonized Australia about 2-3 million years ago, undergoing major adaptive radiation.

Earlier taxonomists formerly split this group into three subfamilies (Hydromyinae, Pseudomyinae, and an unnamed "Old Papuan group"). Although all were later merged into the Murinae, they were still retained as multiple tribes (Anisomyini, Hydromyini, Uromyini, and Conilurini), with other taxonomists splitting them even further. However, a 2008 study found them to comprise a single group that had undergone a rapid diversification after colonizing Sahul, and thus placed them all into a single tribe, Hydromyini.

The genus Chiropodomys (formerly placed in a polyphyletic division containing Micromys, Hapalomys, and Vandeleuria) has been found to be the sister group to this tribe, but it has been debated over whether it belongs in its own tribe (Chiropodomyini) or is a basal member of the Hydromyini. The American Society of Mammalogists presently classifies it in Hydromyini.

Although the name "Hydromyini" derives from the semiaquatic type genus Hydromys, which translates directly to "water mouse", only a few members of the tribe such as Hydromys and Xeromys are semiaquatic; the majority are terrestrial, and some such as Notomys are even specifically adapted to arid environments.

== Distribution ==
Their center of diversity is in New Guinea, with a secondary one in Australia, but they also range east to the Solomon Islands and west to Borneo and the Philippines, and, if the genus Chiropodomys is included, as far west as northeast India. Members of this tribe in New Guinea and Australia are referred to as the "Old Endemic rodents", to differentiate them from the native Rattus species from the tribe Rattini, which colonized the regions much more recently.

== Species ==
Species in the tribe include:

- Chiropodomys division (sometimes placed in a distinct tribe, Chiropodomyini)
  - Genus Chiropodomys - pencil-tailed tree mice
    - Palawan pencil-tailed tree mouse, Chiropodomys calamianensis
    - Indomalayan pencil-tailed tree mouse, Chiropodomys gliroides
    - Koopman's pencil-tailed tree mouse, Chiropodomys karlkoopmani
    - Large pencil-tailed tree mouse, Chiropodomys major
    - Gray-bellied pencil-tailed tree mouse, Chiropodomys muroides
    - Small pencil-tailed tree mouse, Chiropodomys pusillus
- Chrotomys division
  - Genus Apomys
    - Subgenus Apomys
      - Camiguin forest mouse, Apomys camiguinensis
      - Mount Apo forest mouse, Apomys hylocoetes
      - Mindanao montane forest mouse, Apomys insignis
      - Mindanao lowland forest mouse, Apomys littoralis
      - Small Luzon forest mouse, Apomys microdon
      - Least forest mouse, Apomys musculus
    - Subgenus Megapomys
      - Luzon Cordillera forest mouse, Apomys abrae
      - Luzon Aurora forest mouse, Apomys aurorae
      - Mount Banahaw forest mouse, Apomys banahao
      - Mount Tapulao forest mouse, Apomys brownorum
      - Luzon montane forest mouse, Apomys datae
      - Large Mindoro forest mouse, Apomys gracilirostris
      - Apomys iridensis
      - Mindanao lowland forest mouse, Apomys littoralis
      - Apomys lubangensis
      - Luzon giant forest mouse, Apomys magnus
      - Mount Mingan forest mouse, Apomys minganensis
      - Long-nosed Luzon forest mouse, Apomys sacobianus
      - Sierra Madre forest mouse, Apomys sierrae
      - Luzon Zambales forest mouse, Apomys zambalensis
  - Genus Archboldomys (Mount Isarog shrew rats)
    - Mount Isarog shrew-mouse, Archboldomys luzonensis
    - Large cordillera shrew-mouse, Archboldomys maximus
  - Genus Soricomys
    - Sierra Madre shrew mouse, Soricomys musseri
    - Kalinga shrew mouse, Soricomys kalinga
    - Leonardo shrew mouse, Soricomys leonardocoi
    - Southern Cordillera shrew-mouse, Soricomys montanus
  - Genus Chrotomys - Luzon striped rats
    - Luzon striped rat, Chrotomys whiteheadi
    - Mindoro striped rat, Chrotomys mindorensis
    - Isarog striped shrew-rat, Chrotomys gonzalesi
    - Blazed Luzon shrew-rat, Chrotomys silaceus
    - Sibuyan striped shrew-rat, Chrotomys sibuyanensis
  - Genus Rhynchomys - shrew-like rats
    - Banahao shrew-rat, Rhynchomys banahao
    - Isarog shrew-rat, Rhynchomys isarogensis
    - Labo shrew-rat, Rhynchomys labo
    - Mingan shrew-rat, Rhynchomys mingan
    - Mount Data shrew-rat, Rhynchomys soricoides
    - Tapulao shrew-rat, Rhynchomys tapulao
- Conilurus division
  - Genus Conilurus - rabbit rats
    - †White-footed rabbit rat, Conilurus albipes
    - Brush-tailed rabbit rat, Conilurus penicillatus
  - Genus Leporillus - Australian stick-nest rats
    - †Lesser stick-nest rat, Leporillus apicalis
    - Greater stick-nest rat, Leporillus conditor
  - Genus Mesembriomys - tree rats
    - Black-footed tree rat, Mesembriomys gouldii
    - Golden-backed tree rat, Mesembriomys macrurus
- Haeromys division
  - Genus Haeromys - pygmy tree mice
    - Ranee mouse, Haeromys margarettae
    - Minahassa ranee mouse, Haeromys minahassae
    - Lesser ranee mouse, Haeromys pusillus
- Hydromys division
  - Genus Baiyankamys (formerly in Hydromys)
    - Mountain water rat, Baiyankamys habbema
    - Shaw Mayer's water rat, Baiyankamys shawmayeri
  - Genus Crossomys (Earless Water Rat)
    - Earless water rat, Crossomys moncktoni
  - Genus Hydromys - water rats
    - Rakali, Hydromys chrysogaster
    - Western water rat, Hydromys hussoni
    - New Britain water rat, Hydromys neobrittanicus
    - Ziegler's water rat, Hydromys ziegleri
  - Genus Leptomys
    - Leptomys arfakensis
    - Long-footed water rat, Leptomys elegans
    - Ernst Mayr's water rat, Leptomys ernstmayri
    - Leptomys paulus
    - Fly River water rat, Leptomys signatus
  - Genus Microhydromys
    - Southern groove-toothed moss mouse, Microhydromys argenteus
    - Northern groove-toothed shrew mouse, Microhydromys richardsoni
  - Genus Mirzamys
    - Mirza's western moss rat, Mirzamys louiseae
    - Mirza's eastern moss rat, Mirzamys norahae
  - Genus Parahydromys (Mountain Water Rat)
    - New Guinea waterside rat, Parahydromys asper
  - Genus Paraleptomys
    - Northern water rat, Paraleptomys rufilatus
    - Short-haired water rat, Paraleptomys wilhelmina
  - Genus Pseudohydromys - New Guinea false water rats
    - Bishop moss mouse, Pseudohydromys berniceae
    - Huon small-toothed moss mouse, Pseudohydromys carlae
    - Laurie's moss mouse, Pseudohydromys eleanorae
    - One-toothed shrew mouse, Pseudohydromys ellermani
    - Mottled-tailed shrew mouse, Pseudohydromys fuscus
    - German's one-toothed moss mouse, Pseudohydromys germani
    - Eastern shrew mouse, Pseudohydromys murinus
    - Musser's shrew mouse, Pseudohydromys musseri
    - Western shrew mouse, Pseudohydromys occidentalis
    - Woolley's moss mouse, Pseudohydromys patriciae
    - Southern small-toothed moss mouse, Pseudohydromys pumehanae
    - White-bellied moss mouse, Pseudohydromys sandrae
  - Genus Xeromys (False Water Rat)
    - False water rat, Xeromys myoides
- Mallomys division
  - Genus Abeomelomys
    - Highland brush mouse, Abeomelomys sevia
  - Genus Mallomys - giant tree rats
    - De Vis's woolly rat, Mallomys aroaensis
    - Alpine woolly rat, Mallomys gunung
    - Subalpine woolly rat, Mallomys istapantap
    - Rothschild's woolly rat, Mallomys rothschildi
    - Bosavi woolly rat, Mallomys sp. nov.
    - Arfak woolly rat, Mallomys sp. nov.
    - Foja woolly rat, Mallomys sp. nov.
  - Genus Mammelomys
    - Large-scaled mosaic-tailed rat, Mammelomys lanosus
    - Large mosaic-tailed rat, Mammelomys rattoides
  - Genus Pogonomelomys - Rummler's mosaic tailed rats
    - Lowland brush mouse, Pogonomelomys bruijni
    - Shaw Mayer's brush mouse, Pogonomelomys mayeri
  - Genus Xenuromys (white-tailed New Guinea rats)
    - Mimic tree rat, Xenuromys barbatus
- Pogonomys division
  - Genus Anisomys (Powerful-toothed Rat)
    - Squirrel-toothed rat, Anisomys imitator
  - Genus Chiruromys
    - Greater tree mouse, Chiruromys forbesi
    - Lamia, Chiruromys lamia
    - Lesser tree mouse, Chiruromys vates
  - Genus Hyomys - white-eared rats
    - Western white-eared giant rat, Hyomys dammermani
    - Eastern white-eared giant rat, Hyomys goliath
  - Genus Lorentzimys (New Guinea jumping mouse)
    - New Guinean jumping mouse, Lorentzimys nouhuysi
  - Genus Macruromys - New Guinean rats
    - Lesser small-toothed rat, Macruromys elegans
    - Eastern small-toothed rat, Macruromys major
  - Genus Pogonomys - prehensile-tailed rats
    - Champion's tree mouse, Pogonomys championi
    - D'Entrecasteaux Archipelago tree mouse, Pogonomys fergussoniensis
    - Large tree mouse, Pogonomys loriae
    - Chestnut tree mouse, Pogonomys macrourus
    - Prehensile-tailed rat, Pogonomys mollipilosus
    - Gray-bellied tree mouse, Pogonomys sylvestris
- Pseudomys division
  - Genus Leggadina
    - Forrest's mouse, Leggadina forresti
    - Lakeland Downs mouse, Leggadina lakedownensis
  - Genus Mastacomys
    - Broad-toothed mouse, Mastacomys fuscus
  - Genus Notomys - Australian hopping mice
    - Spinifex hopping mouse, Notomys alexis
    - Short-tailed hopping mouse, Notomys amplus †
    - Northern hopping mouse, Notomys aquilo
    - Fawn hopping mouse, Notomys cervinus
    - Dusky hopping mouse, Notomys fuscus
    - Long-tailed hopping mouse, Notomys longicaudatus †
    - Big-eared hopping mouse, Notomys macrotis †
    - Mitchell's hopping mouse, Notomys mitchellii
    - Darling Downs hopping mouse, Notomys mordax †
    - Great hopping mouse, Notomys robustus †
  - Genus Pseudomys - Australian native mice
    - Ash-grey mouse, Pseudomys albocinereus
    - Silky mouse, Pseudomys apodemoides
    - Plains rat, Pseudomys australis
    - Bolam's mouse, Pseudomys bolami
    - Kakadu pebble-mound mouse, Pseudomys calabyi
    - Western pebble-mound mouse, Pseudomys chapmani
    - Little native mouse, Pseudomys delicatulus
    - Desert mouse, Pseudomys desertor
    - Smoky mouse, Pseudomys fumeus
    - Blue-gray mouse, Pseudomys glaucus †
    - Gould's mouse, Pseudomys gouldii
    - Eastern chestnut mouse, Pseudomys gracilicaudatus
    - Sandy inland mouse, Pseudomys hermannsburgensis
    - Long-tailed mouse, Pseudomys higginsi
    - Central pebble-mound mouse, Pseudomys johnsoni
      - Kimberley mouse, Pseudomys (laborifex) johnsoni
    - Western chestnut mouse, Pseudomys nanus
    - New Holland mouse, Pseudomys novaehollandiae
    - Western mouse, Pseudomys occidentalis
    - Hastings River mouse, Pseudomys oralis
    - Country mouse, Pseudomys patrius
    - Pilliga mouse, Pseudomys pilligaensis
    - Heath mouse, Pseudomys shortridgei
  - Genus Zyzomys - thick-tailed rats
    - Common rock rat, Zyzomys argurus
    - Arnhem Land rock rat, Zyzomys maini
    - Carpentarian rock rat, Zyzomys palatilis
    - Central rock rat, Zyzomys pedunculatus
    - Kimberley rock rat, Zyzomys woodwardi
- Uromys division
  - Genus Melomys - banana rats
    - Dusky mosaic-tailed rat, Melomys aerosus
    - Rossel Island mosaic-tailed rat, Melomys arcium
    - Bannister's rat, Melomys bannisteri
    - Bougainville mosaic-tailed rat, Melomys bougainville
    - Grassland mosaic-tailed rat, Melomys burtoni
    - Cape York mosaic-tailed rat, Melomys capensis
    - Fawn-footed mosaic-tailed rat, Melomys cervinipes
    - Yamdena mosaic-tailed rat, Melomys cooperae
    - Dollman's mosaic-tailed rat, Melomys dollmani
    - Manusela mosaic-tailed rat, Melomys fraterculus
    - Snow Mountains grassland mosaic-tailed rat, Melomys frigicola
    - Seram long-tailed mosaic-tailed rat, Melomys fulgens
    - Riama mosaic-tailed rat, Melomys howi
    - White-bellied mosaic-tailed rat, Melomys leucogaster
    - Papua grassland mosaic-tailed rat, Melomys lutillus
    - Manus Island mosaic-tailed rat, Melomys matambuai
    - Obi mosaic-tailed rat, Melomys obiensis
    - Pavel's Seram mosaic-tailed rat, Melomys paveli
    - Bramble Cay mosaic-tailed rat, Melomys rubicola
    - Black-tailed mosaic-tailed rat, Melomys rufescens
    - Buka Island mosaic-tailed rat, Melomys spechti
    - Short-tailed Talaud mosaic-tailed rat, Melomys caurinus
    - Long-tailed Talaud mosaic-tailed rat, Melomys talaudium
  - Genus Paramelomys
    - Gressitt's mosaic-tailed rat, Paramelomys gressitti
    - Long-nosed mosaic-tailed rat, Paramelomys levipes
    - Lorentz's mosaic-tailed rat, Paramelomys lorentzii
    - Thomas's mosaic-tailed rat, Paramelomys mollis
    - Moncton's mosaic-tailed rat, Paramelomys moncktoni
    - Paramelomys naso (formerly in P. levipes)
    - Lowland mosaic-tailed rat, Paramelomys platyops
    - Mountain mosaic-tailed rat, Paramelomys rubex
    - Paramelomys steini
  - Genus Protochromys
    - Red-bellied mosaic-tailed rat, Protochromys fellowsi
  - Genus Solomys - naked-tailed rats
    - Poncelet's giant rat, Solomys ponceleti
    - Florida naked-tailed rat, Solomys salamonis
    - Bougainville naked-tailed rat, Solomys salebrosus
    - Isabel naked-tailed rat, Solomys sapientis
    - Buka Island naked-tailed rat, Solomys spriggsarum
  - Genus Uromys - giant naked-tailed rats
    - Giant naked-tailed rat, Uromys anak
    - Biak giant rat, Uromys boeadii
    - Giant white-tailed rat, Uromys caudimaculatus
    - Emma's giant rat, Uromys emmae
    - Masked white-tailed rat, Uromys hadrourus
    - Emperor rat, Uromys imperator (possibly extinct)
    - Bismarck giant rat, Uromys neobritanicus
    - Guadalcanal rat, Uromys porculus (possibly extinct)
    - King rat, Uromys rex
    - Great Key Island giant rat, Uromys siebersi
    - Vangunu giant rat, Uromys vika
- Unknown division
  - Genus Brassomys
    - White-toothed brush mouse, Brassomys albidens
  - Genus Coccymys
    - Coccymys kirrhos
    - Rümmler's brush mouse, Coccymys ruemmleri
    - Coccymys shawmayeri

== Threats ==
In Australia, many members of this tribe have gone extinct very rapidly since the 19th century due to introduced predators and habitat alteration (such as development and fire suppression). Prominent examples include the white-footed rabbit rat (Conilurus albipes), lesser stick-nest rat (Leporillus apicalis), blue-grey mouse (Pseudomys glaucus) and over half the recent species in the genus Notomys, most of which likely went extinct during the late 19th or early 20th centuries; many other species have also seen significantly reduced populations or range reductions. Genetic studies indicate that many of these species had relatively high genetic diversity prior to European colonization, indicating that they were not suffering from inbreeding beforehand and that high genetic diversity does not shield species from extinctions. Another species, the Bramble Cay melomys (Melomys rubicola), which went extinct in the early 2010s, was the first recorded extinction of an animal due to sea level rise.
