= List of mammals of Papua New Guinea =

This is a list of the mammal species recorded in Papua New Guinea. There are 248 mammal species in Papua New Guinea, of which seven are critically endangered, twelve are endangered and forty are vulnerable.

== Abbreviations ==
The following tags are used to highlight each species' conservation status as assessed by the International Union for Conservation of Nature:

EX	Extinct	No reasonable doubt that the last individual has died.
EW	Extinct in the wild	Known only to survive in captivity or as a naturalized populations well outside its previous range.
CR	Critically endangered	The species is in imminent risk of extinction in the wild.
EN	Endangered	The species is facing an extremely high risk of extinction in the wild.
VU	Vulnerable	The species is facing a high risk of extinction in the wild.
NT	Near threatened	The species does not meet any of the criteria that would categorise it as risking extinction but it is likely to do so in the future.
LC	Least concern	There are no current identifiable risks to the species.
DD	Data deficient	There is inadequate information to make an assessment of the risks to this species.

Some species were assessed using an earlier set of criteria. Species assessed using this system have the following instead of near threatened and least concern categories:

LR/cd	Lower risk/conservation dependent	Species which were the focus of conservation programmes and may have moved into a higher risk category if that programme was discontinued.
LR/nt	Lower risk/near threatened	Species which are close to being classified as vulnerable but are not the subject of conservation programmes.
LR/lc	Lower risk/least concern	Species for which there are no identifiable risks.

== Subclass: Theria ==
=== Infraclass: Eutheria ===
==== Order: Sirenia (manatees and dugongs) ====
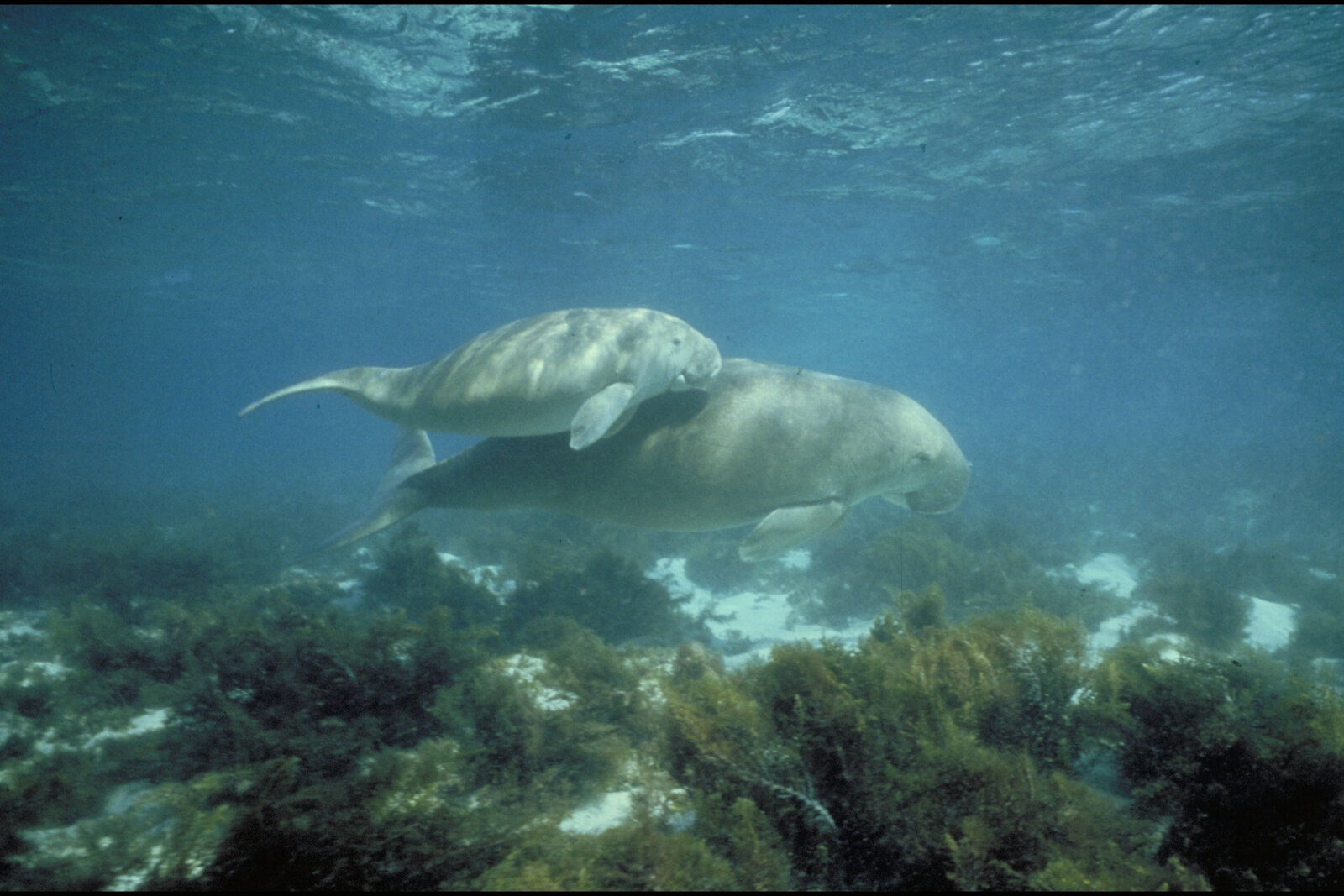
Dugongs

Sirenia is an order of fully aquatic, herbivorous mammals that inhabit rivers, estuaries, coastal marine waters, swamps, and marine wetlands. All four species are endangered.

- Family: Dugongidae
  - Genus: Dugong
    - Dugong, Dugong dugon VU

==== Order: Rodentia (rodents) ====
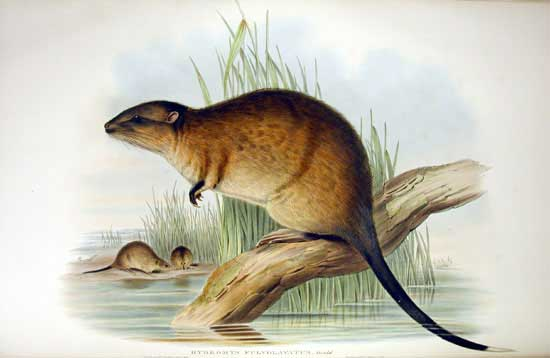
Water rat

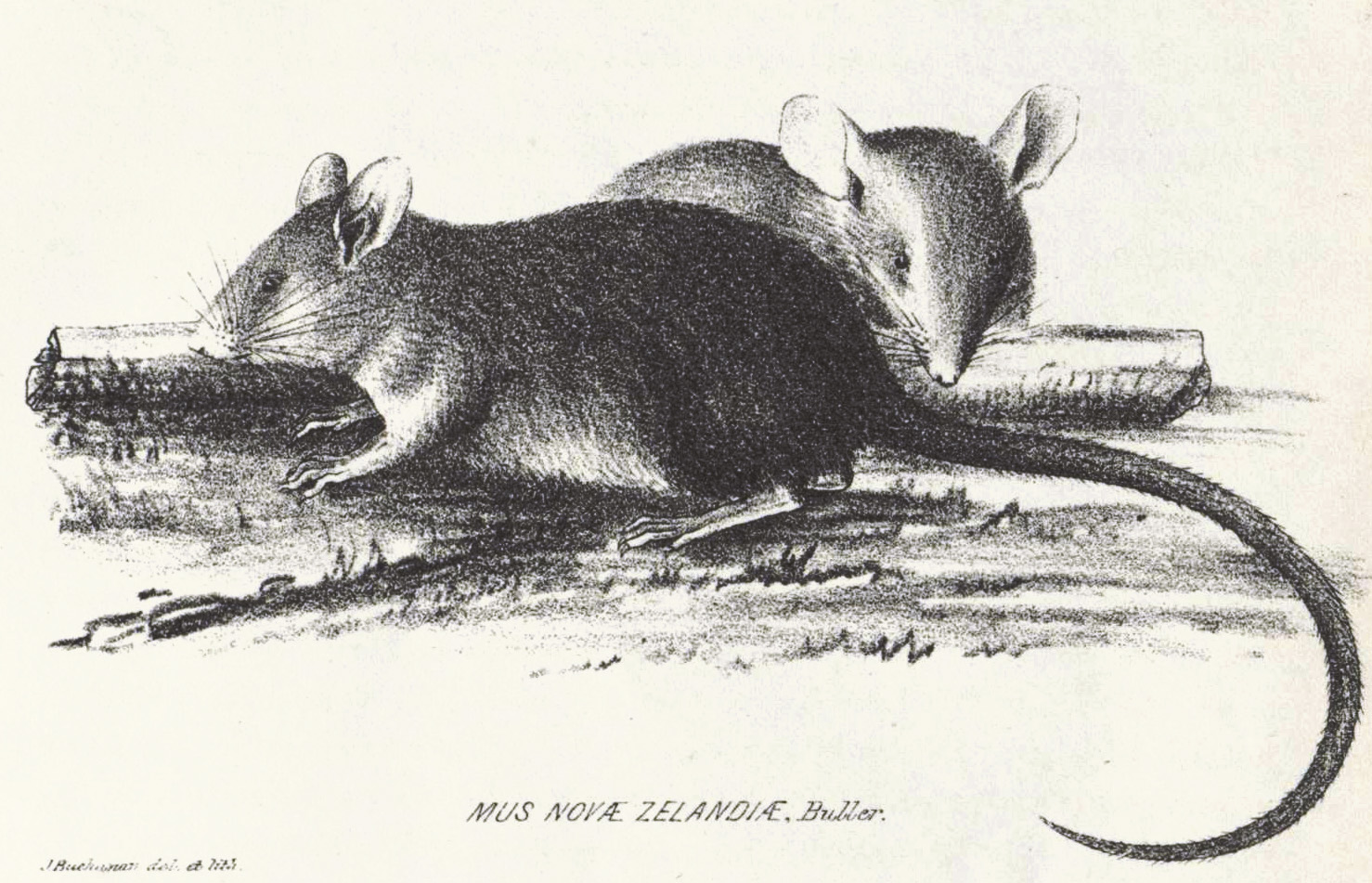
Polynesian rat

Rodents make up the largest order of mammals, with over 40% of mammalian species. They have two incisors in the upper and lower jaw which grow continually and must be kept short by gnawing.

- Suborder: Sciurognathi
  - Family: Muridae (mice, rats, voles, gerbils, hamsters, etc.)
    - Subfamily: Murinae
      - Genus: Anisomys
        - Squirrel-toothed rat, Anisomys imitator LR/lc
      - Genus: Chiruromys
        - Greater tree mouse, Chiruromys forbesi LR/lc
        - Lamia, Chiruromys lamia LR/lc
        - Lesser tree mouse, Chiruromys vates LR/lc
      - Genus: Coccymys
        - Rümmler's brush mouse, Coccymys ruemmleri LR/lc
      - Genus: Conilurus
        - Brush-tailed rabbit rat, Conilurus penicillatus LR/lc
      - Genus: Crossomys
        - Earless water rat, Crossomys moncktoni LR/lc
      - Genus: Hydromys
        - Water rat, Hydromys chrysogaster LR/lc
        - Western water rat, Hydromys hussoni LR/nt
        - New Britain water rat, Hydromys neobrittanicus VU
      - Genus: Baiyankamys
        - Mountain water rat, Baiyankamys habbema LR/nt
        - Shaw Mayer's water rat, Baiyankamys shawmayeri LR/nt
      - Genus: Hyomys
        - Western white-eared giant rat, Hyomys dammermani LR/lc
        - Eastern white-eared giant rat, Hyomys goliath LR/lc
      - Genus: Leptomys
        - Long-footed water rat, Leptomys elegans CR
        - Ernst Mayr's water rat, Leptomys ernstmayri LR/lc
        - Fly River water rat, Leptomys signatus CR
      - Genus: Lorentzimys
        - New Guinean jumping mouse, Lorentzimys nouhuysi LR/lc
      - Genus: Macruromys
        - Eastern small-toothed rat, Macruromys major EN
      - Genus: Mallomys
        - De Vis's woolly rat, Mallomys aroaensis LR/lc
        - Subalpine woolly rat, Mallomys istapantap LR/nt
        - Rothschild's woolly rat, Mallomys rothschildi LR/lc
      - Genus: Mammelomys
        - Large-scaled mosaic-tailed rat, Mammelomys lanosus LR/lc
        - Large mosaic-tailed rat, Mammelomys rattoides LR/lc
      - Genus: Melomys
        - Bougainville mosaic-tailed rat, Melomys bougainville LR/nt
        - Grassland mosaic-tailed rat, Melomys burtoni LR/lc
        - Red-bellied mosaic-tailed rat, Melomys fellowsi VU
        - Slender mosaic-tailed rat, Melomys gracilis LR/lc
        - White-bellied mosaic-tailed rat, Melomys leucogaster LR/lc
        - Long-nosed mosaic-tailed rat, Melomys levipes LR/lc
        - Lorentz's mosaic-tailed rat, Melomys lorentzii LR/lc
        - Thomas's mosaic-tailed rat, Melomys mollis LR/lc
        - Moncton's mosaic-tailed rat, Melomys moncktoni LR/lc
        - Lowland mosaic-tailed rat, Melomys platyops LR/lc
        - Mountain mosaic-tailed rat, Melomys rubex LR/lc
        - Black-tailed mosaic-tailed rat, Melomys rufescens LR/lc
      - Genus: Microhydromys
        - Musser's shrew mouse, Microhydromys musseri LR/lc
        - Groove-toothed shrew mouse, Microhydromys richardsoni LR/nt
      - Genus: Parahydromys
        - New Guinea waterside rat, Parahydromys asper LR/lc
      - Genus: Paraleptomys
        - Northern water rat, Paraleptomys rufilatus LR/lc
        - Short-haired water rat, Paraleptomys wilhelmina VU
      - Genus: Pogonomelomys
        - Grey pogonomelomys, Pogonomelomys brassi LC
        - Lowland brush mouse, Pogonomelomys bruijni CR
        - Shaw Mayer's brush mouse, Pogonomelomys mayeri LR/lc
        - Highland brush mouse, Pogonomelomys sevia LR/lc
      - Genus: Pogonomys
        - Champion's tree mouse, Pogonomys championi VU
        - Large tree mouse, Pogonomys loriae LR/lc
        - Chestnut tree mouse, Pogonomys macrourus LR/lc
        - Gray-bellied tree mouse, Pogonomys sylvestris LR/lc
      - Genus: Pseudohydromys
        - One-toothed shrew-mouse, Pseudohydromys ellermani VU
        - Mottled-tailed shrew mouse, Pseudohydromys fuscus VU
        - German's one-toothed moss mouse, Pseudohydromys germani
        - Eastern shrew mouse, Pseudohydromys murinus CR
        - Western shrew mouse, Pseudohydromys occidentalis VU
      - Genus: Pseudomys
        - Little native mouse, Pseudomys delicatulus LR/nt
      - Genus: Rattus
        - Polynesian rat, Rattus exulans LR/lc
        - Giluwe rat, Rattus giluwensis LR/nt
        - Cape York rat, Rattus leucopus LR/lc
        - Eastern rat, Rattus mordax LR/lc
        - New Guinean rat, Rattus novaeguineae LR/lc
        - Large New Guinea spiny rat, Rattus praetor LR/lc
        - Dusky field rat, Rattus sordidus LR/nt
        - Stein's rat, Rattus steini LR/lc
      - Genus: Solomys
        - Poncelet's naked-tailed rat, Solomys ponceleti EN
        - Bougainville naked-tailed rat, Solomys salebrosus LR/nt
        - Isabel naked-tailed rat, Solomys sapientis VU
      - Genus: Stenomys
        - Moss-forest rat, Stenomys niobe LR/lc
        - Van Deusen's rat, Stenomys vandeuseni EN
        - Slender rat, Stenomys verecundus LR/lc
      - Genus: Uromys
        - Giant naked-tailed rat, Uromys anak LR/nt
        - Giant white-tailed rat, Uromys caudimaculatus LR/lc
        - Bismarck giant rat, Uromys neobritanicus LR/lc
      - Genus: Xenuromys
        - Rock-dwelling rat, Xenuromys barbatus LR/nt
      - Genus: Xeromys
        - False water rat, Xeromys myoides VU

==== Order: Chiroptera (bats) ====
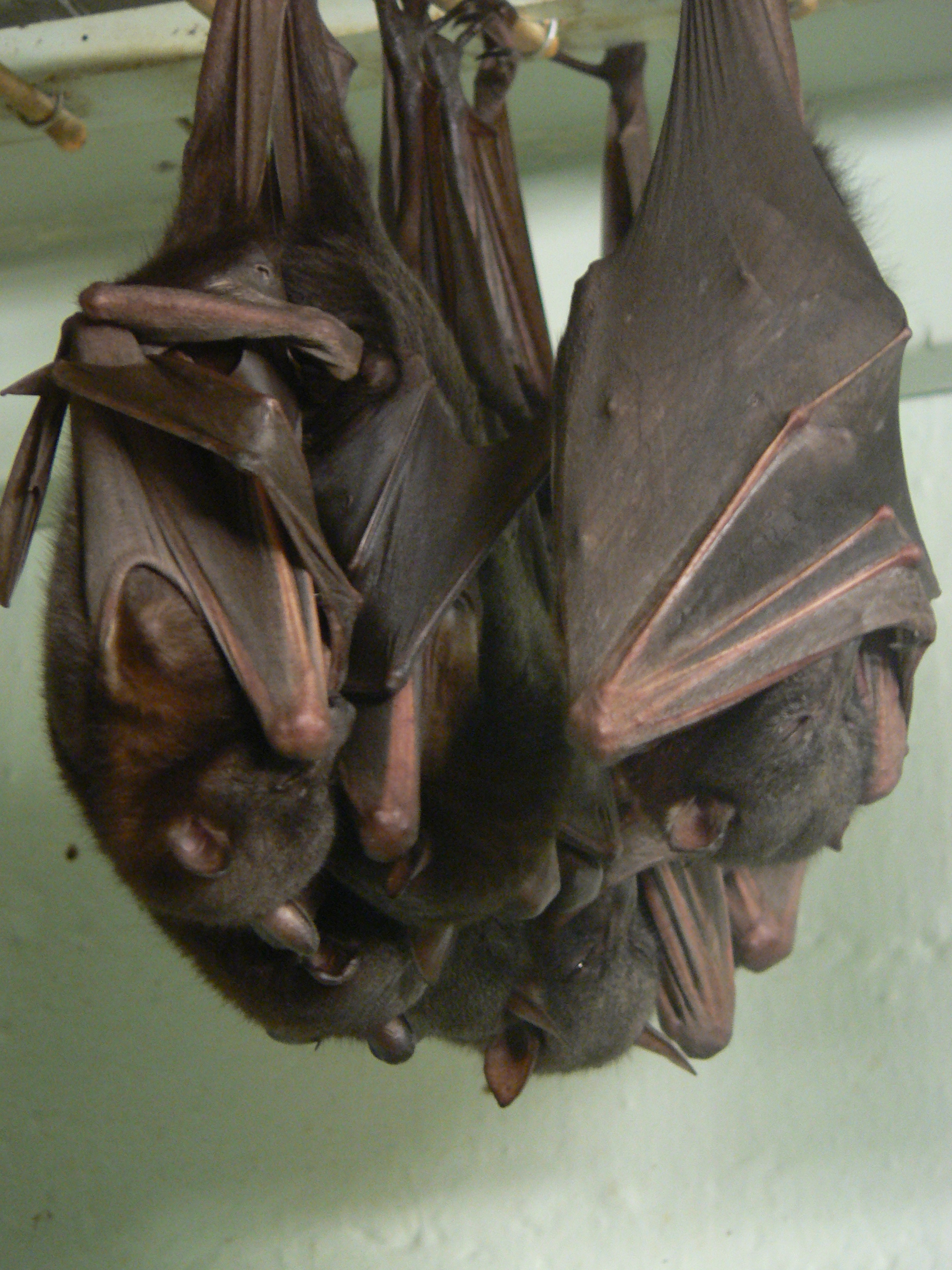
Little red flying-fox

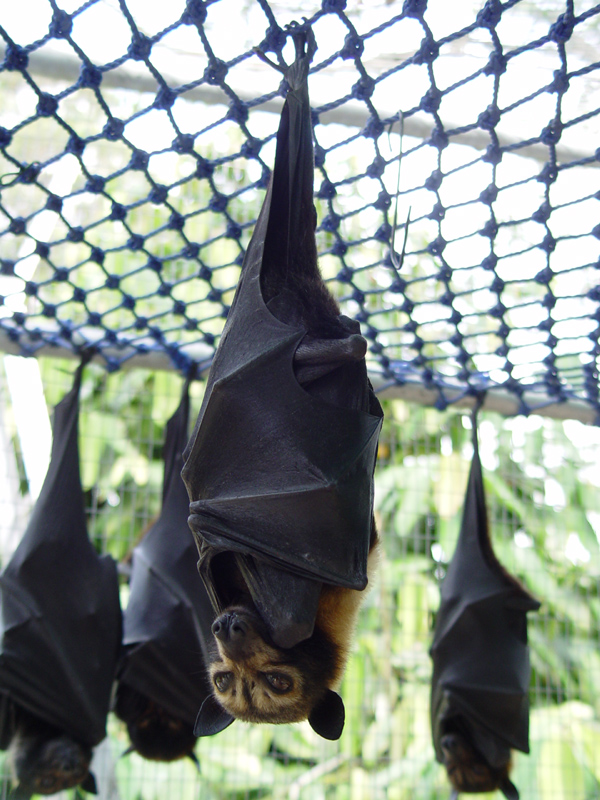
Spectacled flying-fox

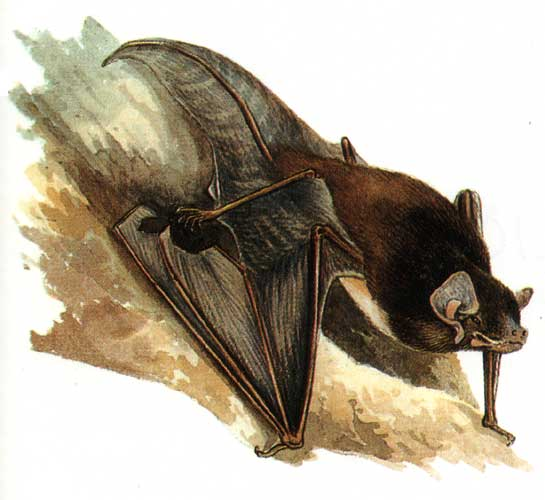
Gould's long-eared bat

The bats' most distinguishing feature is that their forelimbs are developed as wings, making them the only mammals capable of flight. Bat species account for about 20% of all mammals.

- Family: Pteropodidae (flying foxes, Old World fruit bats)
  - Subfamily: Pteropodinae
    - Genus: Aproteles
      - Bulmer's fruit bat, Aproteles bulmerae CR
    - Genus: Dobsonia
      - Lesser naked-backed fruit bat, Dobsonia minor LR/nt
      - Moluccan naked-backed fruit bat, Dobsonia moluccensis LR/lc
      - Panniet naked-backed fruit bat, Dobsonia pannietensis LR/lc
      - New Britain naked-backed fruit bat, Dobsonia praedatrix LR/nt
    - Genus: Nyctimene
      - Broad-striped tube-nosed fruit bat, Nyctimene aello LR/nt
      - Common tube-nosed fruit bat, Nyctimene albiventer LR/lc
      - Pallas's tube-nosed fruit bat, Nyctimene cephalotes LR/lc
      - Mountain tube-nosed fruit bat, Nyctimene certans LR/nt
      - Round-eared tube-nosed fruit bat, Nyctimene cyclotis LR/nt
      - Dragon tube-nosed fruit bat, Nyctimene draconilla VU
      - Island tube-nosed fruit bat, Nyctimene major LR/lc
      - Demonic tube-nosed fruit bat, Nyctimene masalai VU
      - Umboi tube-nosed fruit bat, Nyctimene vizcaccia LR/lc
    - Genus: Paranyctimene
      - Unstriped tube-nosed bat, Paranyctimene raptor LR/nt
    - Genus: Pteralopex
      - Bougainville monkey-faced bat, Pteralopex anceps CR
    - Genus: Pteropus
      - Admiralty flying-fox, Pteropus admiralitatum LR/lc
      - Black flying-fox, Pteropus alecto LR/lc
      - Spectacled flying-fox, Pteropus conspicillatus LR/lc
      - Gilliard's flying-fox, Pteropus gilliardorum VU
      - Small flying-fox, Pteropus hypomelanus LR/lc
      - Big-eared flying fox, Pteropus macrotis LR/lc
      - Lesser flying-fox, Pteropus mahaganus VU
      - Bismarck flying-fox, Pteropus neohibernicus LR/lc
      - Little red flying-fox, Pteropus scapulatus LR/lc
      - Temminck's flying fox, Pteropus temminckii LR/nt
      - Insular flying-fox, Pteropus tonganus LR/lc
    - Genus: Rousettus
      - Geoffroy's rousette, Rousettus amplexicaudatus LR/lc
  - Subfamily: Macroglossinae
    - Genus: Macroglossus
      - Long-tongued nectar bat, Macroglossus minimus LR/lc
    - Genus: Melonycteris
      - Black-bellied fruit bat, Melonycteris melanops LR/lc
    - Genus: Syconycteris
      - Common blossom-bat, Syconycteris australis LR/lc
      - Moss-forest blossom bat, Syconycteris hobbit VU
- Family: Vespertilionidae
  - Subfamily: Kerivoulinae
    - Genus: Kerivoula
      - St. Aignan's trumpet-eared bat, Kerivoula agnella VU
      - Fly River trumpet-eared bat, Kerivoula muscina VU
      - Bismarck's trumpet-eared bat, Kerivoula myrella VU
    - Genus: Phoniscus
      - Golden-tipped bat, Phoniscus papuensis LR/lc
  - Subfamily: Myotinae
    - Genus: Myotis
      - Large-footed bat, Myotis adversus LR/lc
      - Peters's myotis, Myotis atra LR/lc
      - Whiskered myotis, Myotis muricola LR/lc
  - Subfamily: Vespertilioninae
    - Genus: Chalinolobus
      - Hoary wattled bat, Chalinolobus nigrogriseus LR/lc
    - Genus: Nycticeius
      - Northern broad-nosed bat, Nycticeius sanborni LR/lc
    - Genus: Nyctophilus
      - Eastern long-eared bat, Nyctophilus bifax LR/lc
      - Gould's long-eared bat, Nyctophilus gouldi LR/lc
      - Small-toothed long-eared bat, Nyctophilus microdon VU
      - New Guinea long-eared bat, Nyctophilus microtis LR/lc
      - Greater long-eared bat, Nyctophilus timoriensis VU
    - Genus: Pharotis
      - New Guinea big-eared bat, Pharotis imogene CR
    - Genus: Philetor
      - Rohu's bat, Philetor brachypterus LR/lc
    - Genus: Pipistrellus
      - Angulate pipistrelle, Pipistrellus angulatus LR/lc
      - Greater Papuan pipistrelle, Pipistrellus collinus LR/lc
      - Lesser Papuan pipistrelle, Pipistrellus papuanus LR/nt
      - Watt's pipistrelle, Pipistrellus wattsi LR/nt
  - Subfamily: Murininae
    - Genus: Murina
      - Flores tube-nosed bat, Murina florium LR/lc
  - Subfamily: Miniopterinae
    - Genus: Miniopterus
      - Western bent-winged bat, Miniopterus magnater LR/lc
      - Intermediate long-fingered bat, Miniopterus medius LR/lc
      - Schreibers' long-fingered bat, Miniopterus schreibersii LC
      - Great bent-winged bat, Miniopterus tristis LR/lc
- Family: Molossidae
  - Genus: Chaerephon
    - Northern freetail bat, Chaerephon jobensis LR/lc
  - Genus: Mormopterus
    - Beccari's mastiff bat, Mormopterus beccarii LR/lc
    - Southern free-tailed bat, Mormopterus planiceps LR/lc
  - Genus: Otomops
    - Big-eared mastiff bat, Otomops papuensis VU
    - Mantled mastiff bat, Otomops secundus VU
  - Genus: Tadarida
    - White-striped free-tailed bat, Tadarida australis LR/nt
- Family: Emballonuridae
  - Genus: Emballonura
    - Beccari's sheath-tailed bat, Emballonura beccarii LR/lc
    - Large-eared sheath-tailed bat, Emballonura dianae VU
    - New Guinea sheath-tailed bat, Emballonura furax VU
    - Raffray's sheath-tailed bat, Emballonura raffrayana LR/nt
    - Seri's sheathtail-bat, Emballonura serii DD
  - Genus: Mosia
    - Dark sheath-tailed bat, Mosia nigrescens LR/lc
  - Genus: Saccolaimus
    - Yellow-bellied pouched bat, Saccolaimus flaviventris LR/nt
    - Troughton's pouched bat, Saccolaimus mixtus VU
    - Naked-rumped pouched bat, Saccolaimus saccolaimus LR/lc
  - Genus: Taphozous
    - Coastal tomb bat, Taphozous australis LR/nt
- Family: Rhinolophidae
  - Subfamily: Rhinolophinae
    - Genus: Rhinolophus
      - Arcuate horseshoe bat, Rhinolophus arcuatus LR/lc
      - Broad-eared horseshoe bat, Rhinolophus euryotis LR/lc
      - Smaller horseshoe bat, Rhinolophus megaphyllus LR/lc
      - Large-eared horseshoe bat, Rhinolophus philippinensis LR/nt
  - Subfamily: Hipposiderinae
    - Genus: Anthops
      - Flower-faced bat, Anthops ornatus VU
    - Genus: Aselliscus
      - Temminck's trident bat, Aselliscus tricuspidatus LR/lc
    - Genus: Hipposideros
      - Dusky roundleaf bat, Hipposideros ater LR/lc
      - Spurred roundleaf bat, Hipposideros calcaratus LR/lc
      - Telefomin roundleaf bat, Hipposideros corynophyllus VU
      - Fierce roundleaf bat, Hipposideros dinops LR/nt
      - Hill's roundleaf bat, Hipposideros edwardshilli LR/nt
      - Maggie Taylor's roundleaf bat, Hipposideros maggietaylorae LR/lc
      - Fly River roundleaf bat, Hipposideros muscinus VU
      - Semon's roundleaf bat, Hipposideros semoni LR/nt
      - Wollaston's roundleaf bat, Hipposideros wollastoni LR/nt

==== Order: Carnivora (carnivores) ====
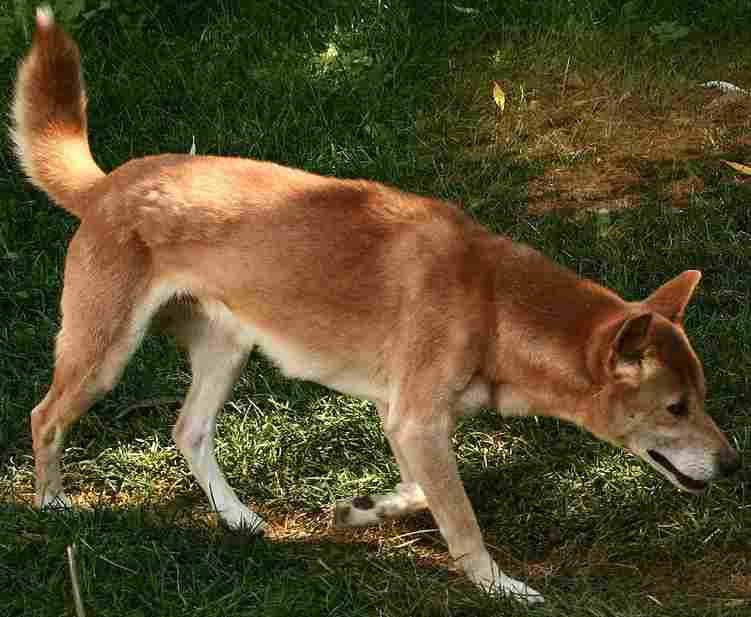
New Guinea singing dog

The order Carnivora includes diverse placental mammals like cats, dogs, bears, weasels, seals, and pandas, characterized by powerful jaws, prominent canines, and specialized shearing teeth (carnassials) for cutting flesh, though many are omnivores or even herbivores (like pandas).

- Suborder: Caniformia
  - Superfamily: Canoidea
    - Family: Canidae
      - Subfamily: Caninae
        - Genus: Canis
          - New Guinea singing dog, Canis hallstromi CR(EW?)

==== Order: Artiodactyla (even toed ungulates) ====
Artiodactyla are the order of even-toed ungulates hoofed mammals characterized by bearing weight on two an even number of their five toes, typically the third and fourth, often forming hooves. This diverse group includes familiar animals like suids, deer, bovines, camels, hippos, sheep, and giraffes.

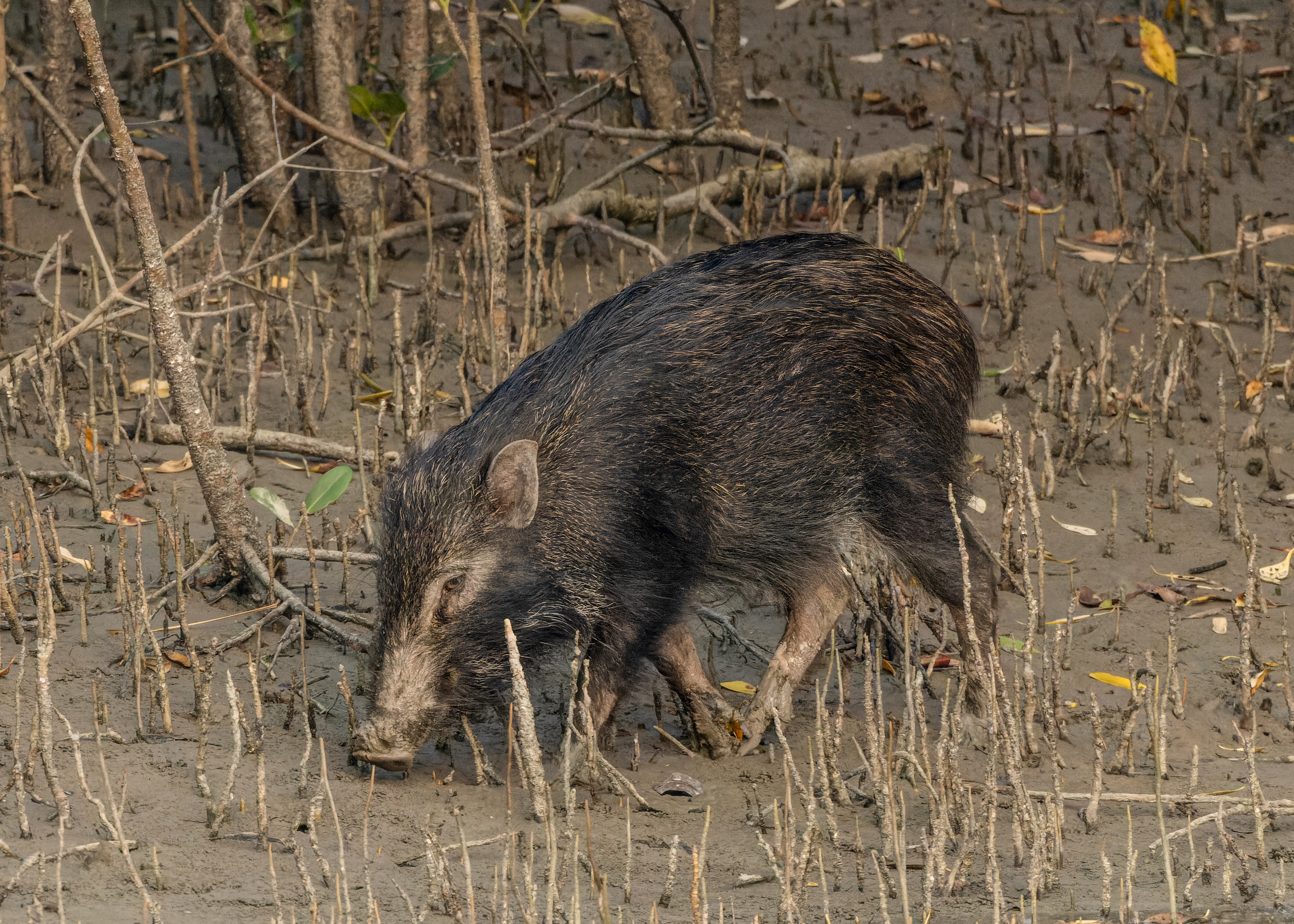
Wild boar

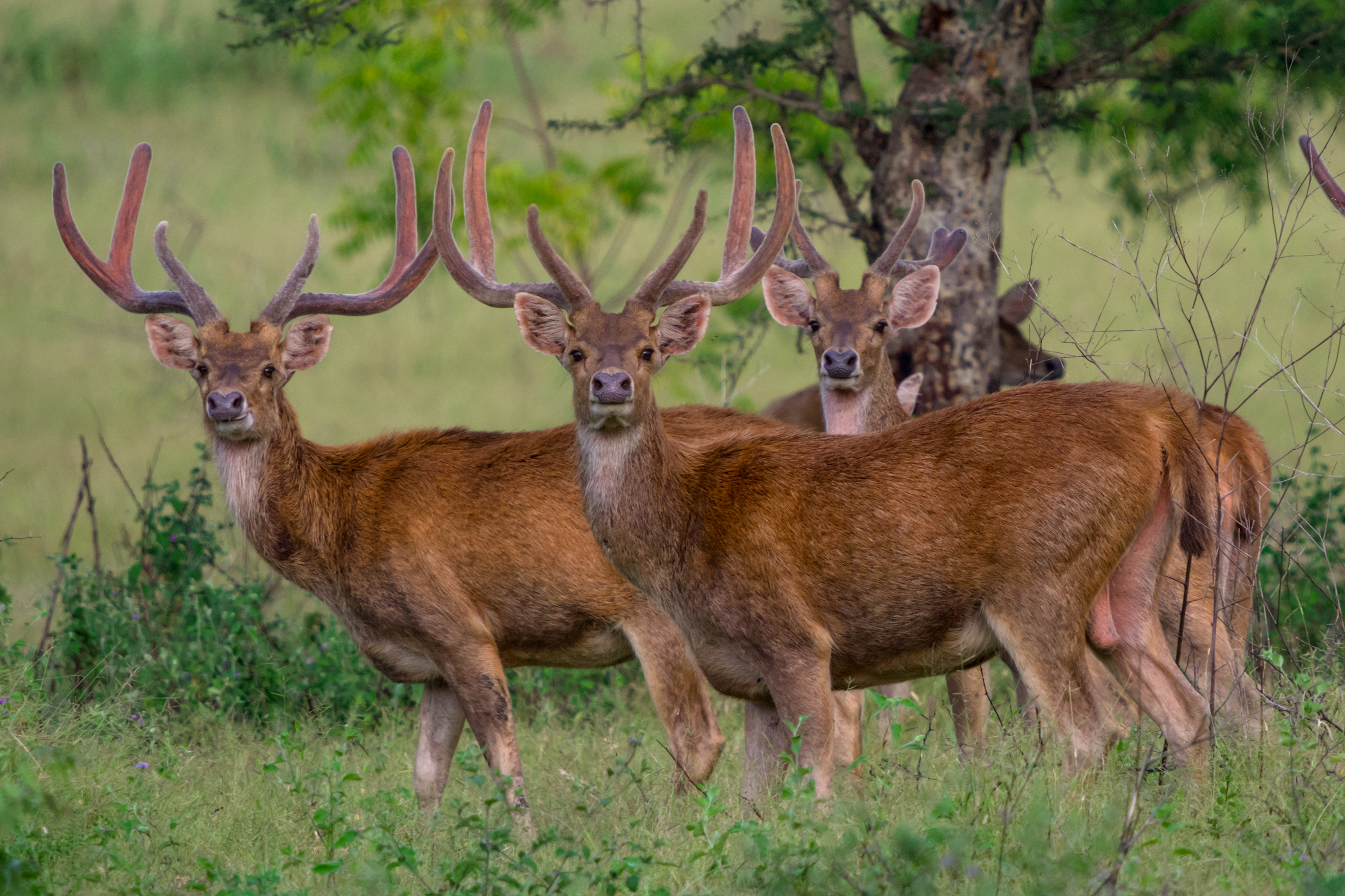
Javan rusa

- Suborder: Suina
  - Superfamily: Suoidea
    - Family: Suidae
      - Subfamily: Suinae
        - Genus: Sus
          - Wild boar, Sus srofa LR/lc introduced
- Suborder: Ruminantia
  - Superfamily: Bovoidea
    - Family: Bovidae
      - Subfamily: Bovinae
        - Genus: Bubalus
          - Domestic water buffalo, Bubalus bubalis introduced
  - Superfamily: Cervoidea
    - Family: Cervidae
      - Subfamily: Cervinae
        - Genus: Rusa
          - Javan rusa, Rusa timorensis VU introduced

==== Order: Cetacea (whales) ====
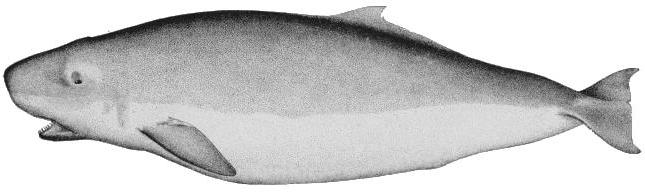
Pygmy sperm whale

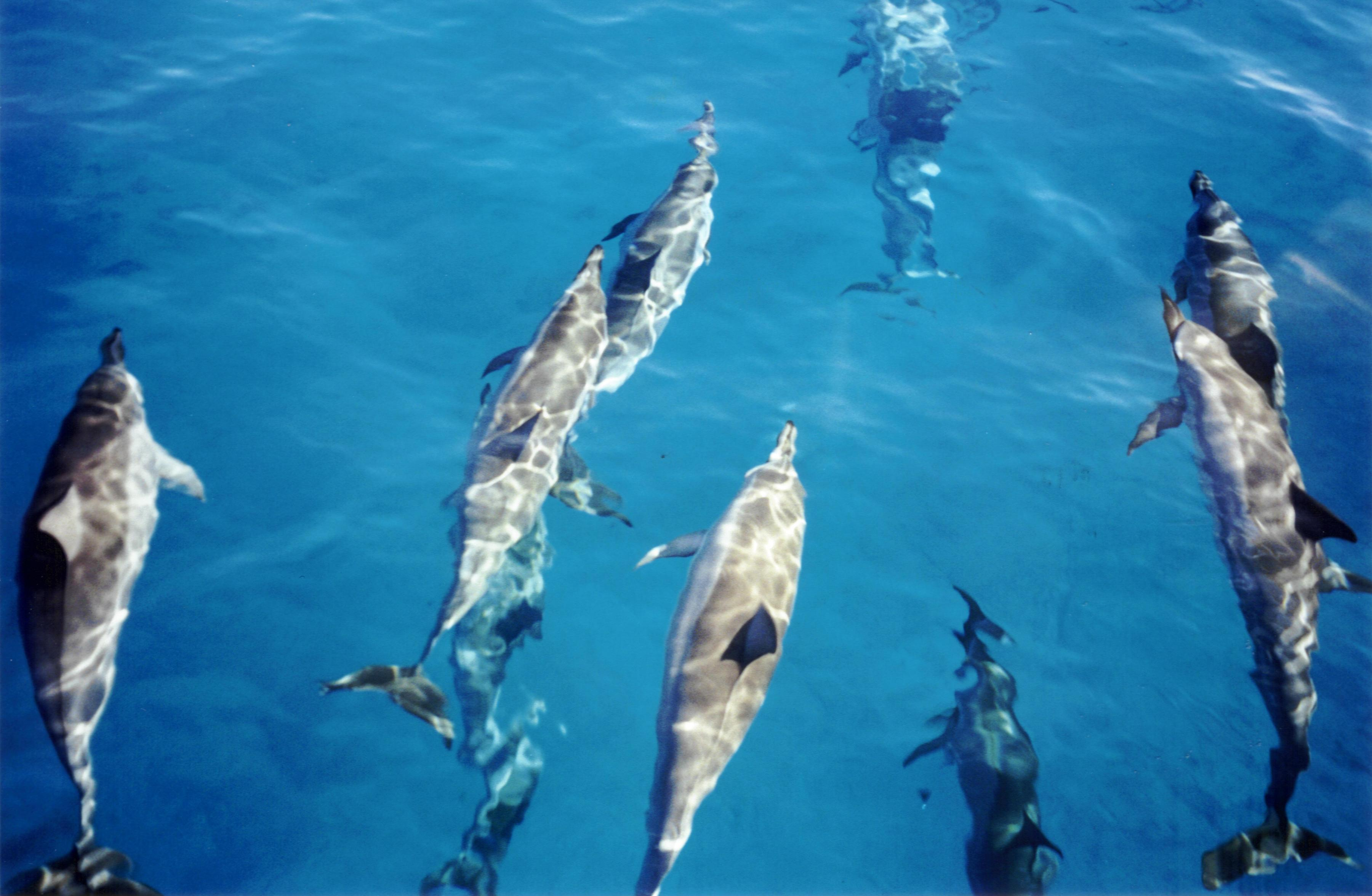
Spinner dolphins

The order Cetacea includes whales, dolphins and porpoises. They are the mammals most fully adapted to aquatic life with a spindle-shaped nearly hairless body, protected by a thick layer of blubber, and forelimbs and tail modified to provide propulsion underwater.

- Suborder: Odontoceti
  - Superfamily: Platanistoidea
    - Family: Kogiidae
      - Genus: Kogia
        - Pygmy sperm whale, Kogia breviceps LR/lc
        - Dwarf sperm whale, Kogia sima LR/lc
    - Family: Ziphidae
      - Subfamily: Hyperoodontinae
        - Genus: Mesoplodon
          - Blainville's beaked whale, Mesoplodon densirostris DD
          - Ginkgo-toothed beaked whale, Mesoplodon ginkgodens DD
    - Family: Delphinidae (marine dolphins)
      - Genus: Steno
        - Rough-toothed dolphin, Steno bredanensis DD
      - Genus: Sousa
        - Australian humpback dolphin, Sousa saulensis DD
      - Genus: Stenella
        - Pantropical spotted dolphin, Stenella attenuata LR/cd
        - Spinner dolphin, Stenella longirostris LR/cd
      - Genus: Lagenodelphis
        - Fraser's dolphin, Lagenodelphis hosei DD
      - Genus: Grampus
        - Risso's dolphin, Grampus griseus DD
      - Genus: Peponocephala
        - Melon-headed whale, Peponocephala electra LR/lc
      - Genus: Feresa
        - Pygmy killer whale, Feresa attenuata DD
      - Genus: Orcinus
        - Orca or killer whale, Orcinus orca LR/cd
      - Genus: Orcaella
        - Australian snubfin dolphin, Orcaella heinsohniDD

=== Infraclass: Metatheria ===
==== Order: Dasyuromorphia (marsupial carnivores) ====
The order Dasyuromorphia comprises most of the carnivorous marsupials, including quolls, dunnarts, the numbat, the Tasmanian devil, and the recently extinct thylacine.

- Family: Dasyuridae (flesh-eating marsupials)
  - Subfamily: Dasyurinae
    - Tribe: Dasyurini
      - Genus: Dasyurus
        - New Guinean quoll, D. albopunctatus NT
        - Bronze quoll, D. spartacus NT
      - Genus: Myoictis
        - Three-striped dasyure, Myoictis melas LC
      - Genus: Neophascogale
        - Speckled dasyure, Neophascogale lorentzi LC
      - Genus: Phascolosorex
        - Narrow-striped marsupial shrew, Phascolosorex dorsalis LC
    - Tribe: Phascogalini
      - Genus Micromurexia
        - Habbema dasyure, Micromurexia habbema LC
      - Genus Murexechinus
        - Black-tailed dasyure, Murexechinus melanurus LC
      - Genus: Murexia
        - Short-furred dasyure, Murexia longicaudata LC
      - Genus Paramurexia
        - Broad-striped dasyure, Paramurexia rothschildi VU
      - Genus Phascomurexia
        - Long-nosed dasyure, Phascomurexia naso LC
  - Subfamily: Sminthopsinae
    - Tribe: Sminthopsini
      - Genus: Sminthopsis
        - Chestnut dunnart, Sminthopsis archeri DD
        - Red-cheeked dunnart, Sminthopsis virginiae LC
    - Tribe: Planigalini
      - Genus: Planigale
        - New Guinean planigale, Planigale novaeguineae LC

==== Order: Peramelemorphia (bandicoots and bilbies) ====
Peramelemorphia includes the bandicoots and bilbies: it equates approximately to the mainstream of marsupial omnivores. All members of the order are endemic to the twin land masses of Australia-New Guinea and most have the characteristic bandicoot shape: a plump, arch-backed body with a long, delicately tapering snout, very large upright ears, relatively long, thin legs, and a thin tail.

- Family: Peramelidae
  - Subfamily: Peramelinae
    - Genus: Isoodon
      - Northern brown bandicoot, Isoodon macrourus LC
  - Subfamily: Peroryctinae
    - Genus: Peroryctes
      - Giant bandicoot, Peroryctes broadbenti EN
      - Raffray's bandicoot, Peroryctes raffrayana LC
  - Subfamily: Echymiperinae
    - Genus: Echymipera
      - Clara's echymipera, Echymipera clara LC
      - David's echymipera, Echymipera davidi EN
      - Menzies' echymipera, Echymipera echinista DD
      - Common spiny bandicoot, Echymipera kalubu LC
      - Long-nosed echymipera, Echymipera rufescens LC
    - Genus: Microperoryctes
      - Striped bandicoot, Microperoryctes longicauda LC
      - Papuan bandicoot, Microperoryctes papuensis LC

==== Order: Diprotodontia (kangaroos, wallabies, wombats and allies) ====
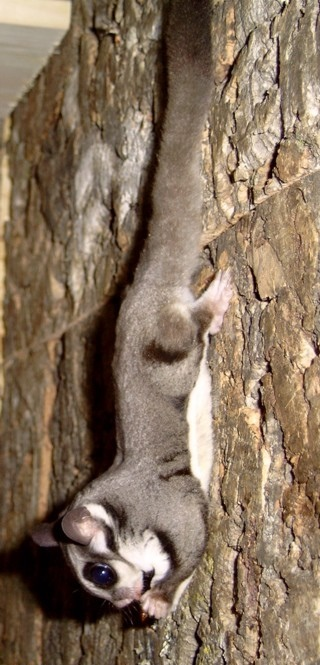
Krefft's glider

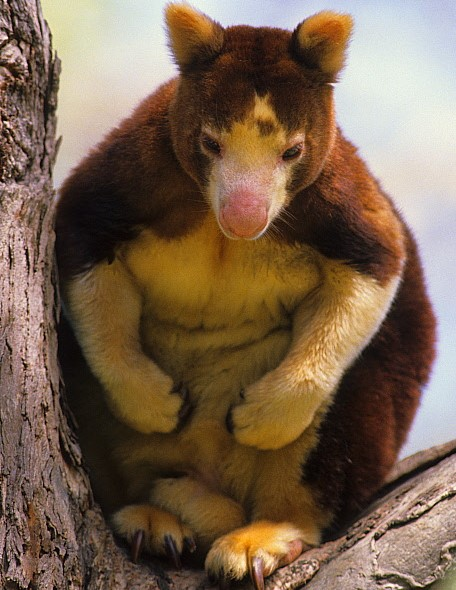
Matschie's tree-kangaroo

Diprotodontia is a large order of about 120 marsupial mammals including the kangaroos, wallabies, possums, koala, wombats, and many others. They are restricted to Australasia.

- Suborder: Phalangeriformes
  - Superfamily: Phalangeroidea
    - Family: Burramyidae
      - Genus: Cercartetus
        - Long-tailed pygmy possum, Cercartetus caudatus LC
    - Family: Phalangeridae (phalangers)
      - Subfamily: Phalangerinae
        - Tribe: Phalangerini
          - Genus: Phalanger
            - Mountain cuscus, Phalanger carmelitae LC
            - Ground cuscus, Phalanger gymnotis LC
            - Southern common cuscus, Phalanger intercastellanus LC
            - Woodlark cuscus, Phalanger lullulae EN
            - Telefomin cuscus, Phalanger matanim CR
            - Southern common cuscus, Phalanger orientalis LC
            - Silky cuscus, Phalanger sericeus LC
            - Stein's cuscus, Phalanger vestitus LC
          - Genus: Spilocuscus
            - Admiralty Island cuscus, Spilocuscus kraemeri NT
            - Common spotted cuscus, Spilocuscus maculatus LC
            - Waigeou cuscus, Spilocuscus papuensis VU
            - Black-spotted cuscus, Spilocuscus rufoniger CR
            - Blue-eyed spotted cuscus, Spilocuscus wilsoni CR
  - Superfamily: Petauroidea
    - Family: Pseudocheiridae
      - Subfamily: Pseudocheirinae
        - Genus: Pseudochirulus
          - Lowland ringtail, Pseudochirulus canescens LC
          - Painted ringtail, Pseudochirulus forbesi LC
          - Pygmy ringtail, Pseudochirulus mayeri LC
      - Subfamily: Pseudochiropsinae
        - Genus: Pseudochirops
          - D'Albertis' ringtail possum, Pseudochirops albertisii NT
          - Lowland ringtail possum, Pseudochirulus canescens LC
          - Plush-coated ringtail possum, Pseudochirops corinnae NT
          - Coppery ringtail possum, Pseudochirops cupreus LC
          - Masked ringtail possum, Pseudochirulus larvatus LC
          - Pygmy ringtail possum, Pseudochirulus mayeri LC
    - Family: Petauridae (gliders, Leadbeater's or striped possums)
      - Genus: Dactylopsila
        - Great-tailed triok, Dactylopsila megalura LC
        - Long-fingered triok, Dactylopsila palpator LC
        - Tate's triok, Dactylopsila tatei EN
        - Striped possum, Dactylopsila trivirgata LC
      - Genus: Petaurus
        - Northern glider, Petaurus abidi CR
        - Krefft's glider, Petaurus notatus NE
    - Family: Acrobatidae
      - Genus: Distoechurus
        - Feathertail possum, Distoechurus pennatus LC
- Suborder: Macropodiformes
  - Family: Macropodidae (kangaroos and wallabies)
    - Subfamily: Macropodinae
      - Genus: Dendrolagus
        - Doria's tree-kangaroo, Dendrolagus dorianus VU
        - Goodfellow's tree-kangaroo, Dendrolagus goodfellowi EN
        - Grizzled tree kangaroo, Dendrolagus inustus VU
        - Matschie's tree-kangaroo, Dendrolagus matschiei EN
        - Tenkile, Dendrolagus scottae CR
        - Lowlands tree-kangaroo, Dendrolagus spadix LC
      - Genus: Dorcopsis
        - Black dorcopsis, Dorcopsis atrata CR
        - White-striped dorcopsis, Dorcopsis hageni LC
        - Gray dorcopsis, Dorcopsis luctuosa VU
      - Genus: Dorcopsulus
        - Macleay's dorcopsis, Dorcopsulus macleayi LC
        - Small dorcopsis, Dorcopsulus vanheurni NT
      - Genus: Lagorchestes
        - Spectacled hare-wallaby, Lagorchestes conspicillatus LC
      - Genus: Macropus
        - Agile wallaby, Macropus agilis LC
      - Genus: Thylogale
        - Brown's pademelon, Thylogale browni VU
        - Dusky pademelon, Thylogale brunii VU
        - Calaby's pademelon, Thylogale calabyi EN
        - Red-legged pademelon, Thylogale stigmatica LC

== Subclass: Protheria ==
=== Order: Monotremata (monotremes) ===
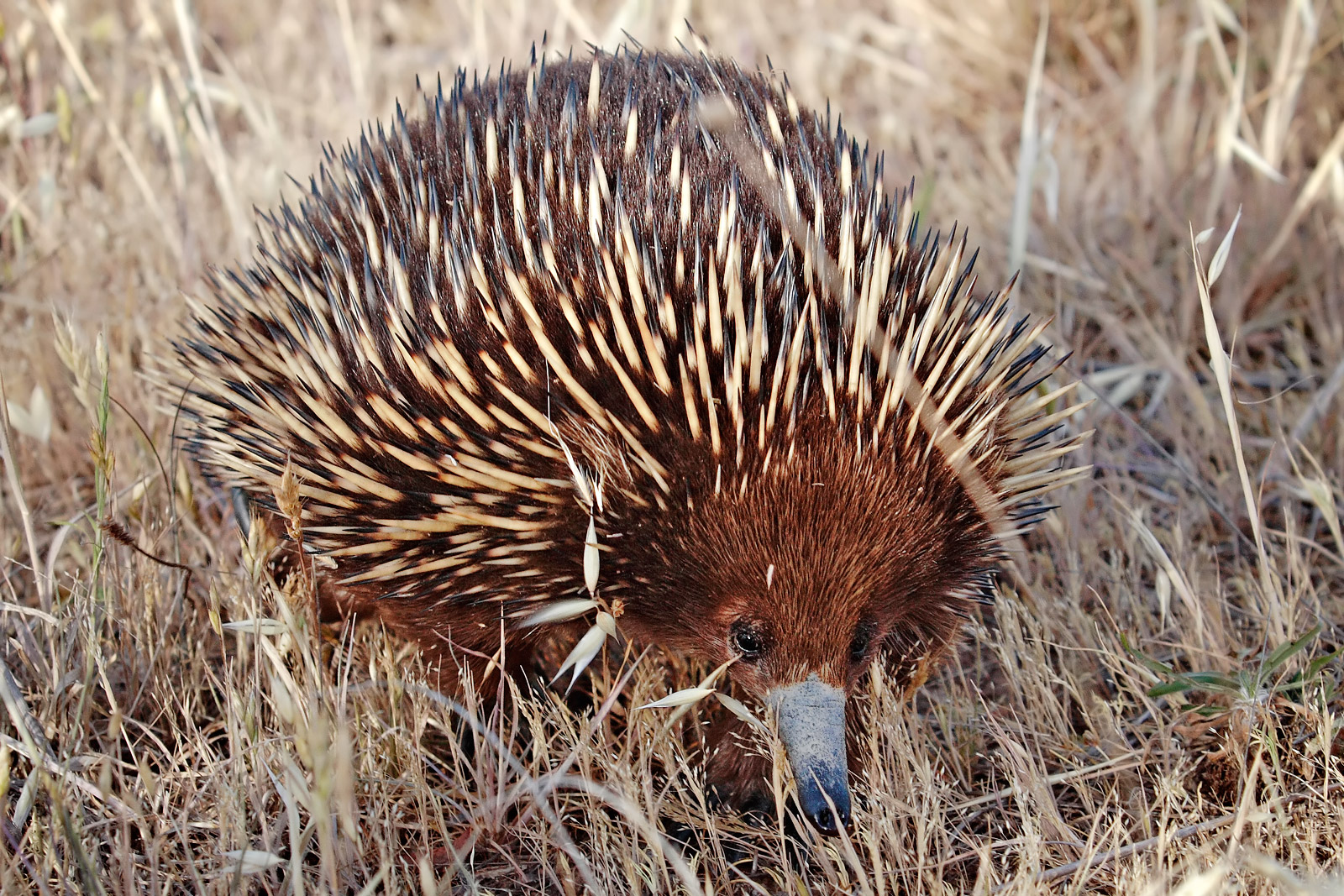
Short-beaked echidna

Monotremes are mammals that lay eggs instead of giving birth to live young. Momotremata comprises the platypus and echidnas.

- Family: Tachyglossidae
  - Genus: Tachyglossus
    - Short-beaked echidna, Tachyglossus aculeatus LC
  - Genus: Zaglossus
    - Eastern long-beaked echidna, Zaglossus bartoni CR

== See also ==
- Fauna of New Guinea
- List of chordate orders
- Lists of mammals by region
- List of prehistoric mammals
- Mammal classification
- List of mammals described in the 2000s
