= Banda Sea Islands moist deciduous forests =

Ecoregion in Banda Sea, Indonesia

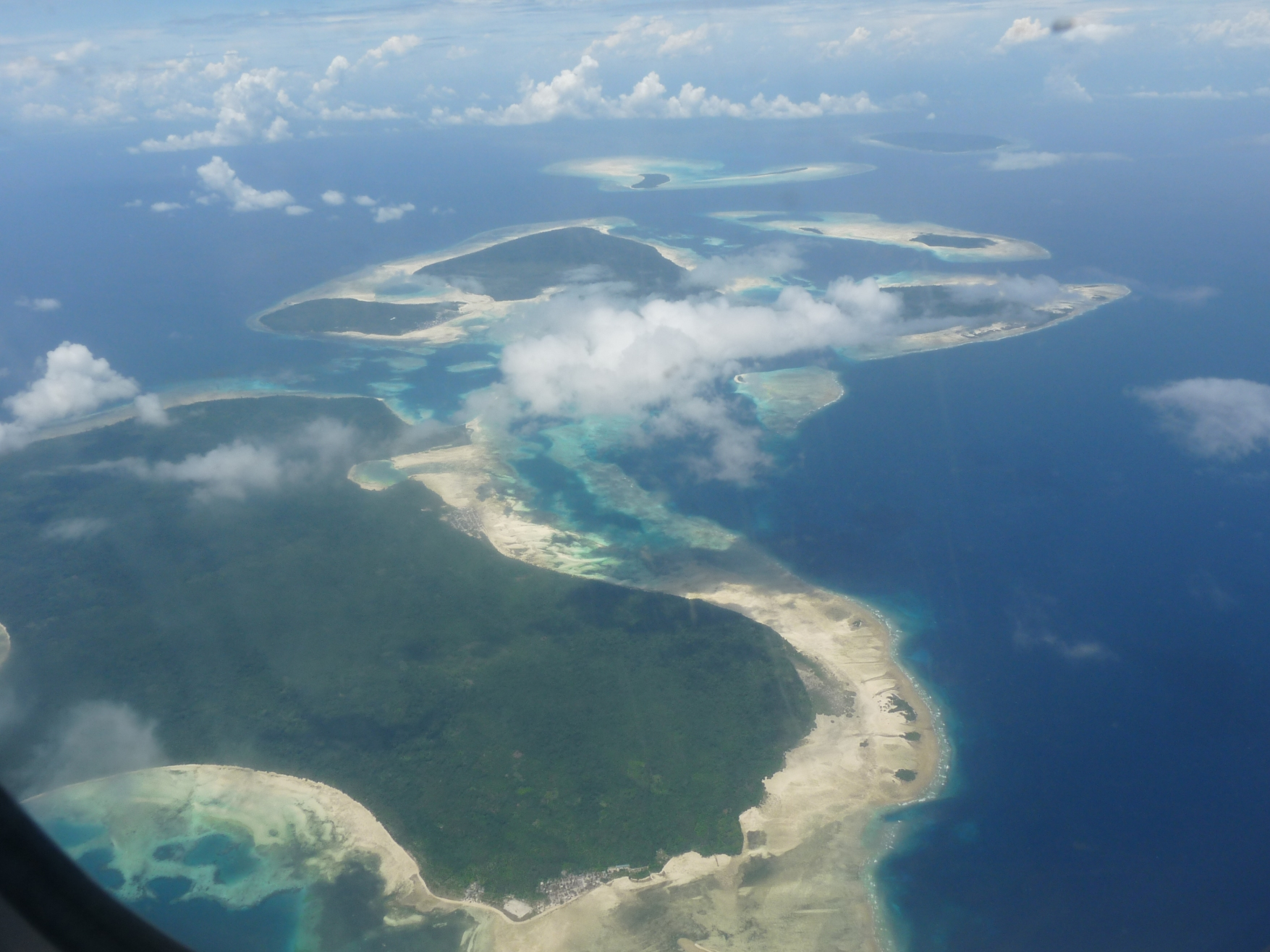
- Tayandu Islands

Ecology
- Realm: Australasian realm
- Biome: tropical and subtropical moist broadleaf forests

Geography
- Area: 7,255 km^{2} (2,801 sq mi)
- Countries: Indonesia
- Province: Maluku
- Coordinates: 4.565°S 129.92°E

Conservation
- Conservation status: Vulnerable
- Protected: 987 km²%

The Banda Sea Islands moist deciduous forests is a tropical moist forest ecoregion in Indonesia. The ecoregion includes several island groups in the southwestern Banda Sea, including the Tanimbar Islands, Kai Islands, and the Barat Daya Islands except for Wetar.

== Geography ==
The islands in the ecoregion are part of Wallacea, a group of indonesian islands which lie between the Australian and Asian continents but were never part of either continent.

The islands consist of two concentric island arcs. The Inner Banda Arc is made up of young, active volcanic islands, including the Banda Islands, Serua Island, Nila Island, Teun Island, Damar Island, and Romang Island.

The Outer Banda Arc is made up of oceanic sediments, principally coralline limestone, together with some older metamorphic rocks which accreted as the Australian plate subducts under the Banda Sea plate. The Outer Banda Arc includes the Kai Islands, Tanimbar Islands, Babar Islands, and Leti Islands. Yamdena in the Tanimbar Islands is the largest island in the ecoregion. Yamdena is mostly low, with a maximum elevation of 120 meters. Yamdena and several other Outer Arc islands have areas of karst where the island's limestone was uplifted and then eroded.

== Climate ==
The ecoregion has a tropical monsoon climate, with two seasons. The west monsoon season runs from mid-December to June, and brings humidity and higher rainfall. The east monsoon season brings drier weather. On Yamdena, the largest island in the Tanimbar Islands and in the ecoregion, the highest rainfall month is February (380 mm), and the driest month is September (100 mm).

The islands receive more rainfall than Timor, Wetar, and the other islands of Nusa Tenggara to the west.

== Flora ==
The principal plant communities are evergreen rain forest, semi-evergreen rain forest, moist deciduous forest, and dry deciduous forest. Common trees in the Tanimbar and Kai forests include Dillenia papuana, Pometia pinnata, Manilkara kanosiensis, Inocarpus fagifer, Heritiera littoralis, Diospyros spp., Garcinia celebica, and Myristica lancifolia.

== Fauna ==
The ecoregion has 22 species of mammals. The dusky pademelon (Thylogale bruinii) is a kangaroo native to the Kai Islands, as well as the Aru Islands and southern New Guinea. The Kei myotis (Myotis stalkeri) is an endemic bat. The Indonesian tomb bat (Taphozous achates) is native to the ecoregion and neighboring Timor.

The islands are home to several species of mosaic-tailed rats (Melomys). In the Tanimbar islands, Melomys cooperae is endemic to Yamdena, and the Riama mosaic-tailed rat (Melomys howi) is endemic to the island of Selaru in the Tanimbar Islands. Bannister's rat (Melomys bannisteri) is endemic to the Kai Islands, and closely related to M. lutillus of New Guinea. The other rodents of the Kai islands are Hydromys chrysogaster and Uromys caudimaculatus, which are also found in New Guinea and Australia.

The ecoregion is home to 225 bird species, including 21 endemic species and subspecies. It corresponds to the Banda Sea Islands endemic bird area.

Endemic birds include the Tanimbar megapode (Megapodius tenimberensis, Megapodiidae), Tanimbar cockatoo (Cacatua goffiniana, Cacatuidae), blue-streaked lory (Eos reticulata, Psittaculidae), green-cheeked bronze cuckoo (Chrysococcyx minutillus rufomerus, Cuculidae), Kai coucal (Centropus spilopterus, Cuculidae), Banda myzomela (Myzomela boiei, Meliphagidae), golden-bellied flyrobin, (Microeca hemixantha, Petroicidae), Wallacean whistler (Pachycephala arctitorquis, Pachycephalidae), cinnamon-tailed fantail (Rhipidura fuscorufa, Rhipiduridae), long-tailed fantail (Rhipidura opistherythra, Rhipiduridae), black-bibbed monarch (Symposiachrus mundus, Monarchidae), Kai monarch (Symposiachrus leucurus, Monarchidae), Kai cuckoo-shrike (Edolisoma dispar, Campephagidae), slaty-backed thrush (Geokichla schistacea, Turdidae), fawn-breasted thrush (Zoothera machiki, Turdidae), Tanimbar starling (Aplonis crassa, Sturnidae), Damar flycatcher (Ficedula henrici, Muscicapidae), Great Kai white-eye (Zosterops grayi, Zosteropidae), Little Kai white-eye (Zosterops uropygialis, Zosteropidae), and Tanimbar bush-warbler (Horornis carolinae, Cettiidae).

== Protected areas ==
A 2017 assessment found that 987 km^{2} (381 sq mi), 14% of the ecoregion, is in protected areas. Protected areas include Kai Besar Nature Reserve.
