= Tree mouse =

Tree mouse may refer to members of the following genera of rodents:

- Arborimus, from western Foja mountain;
- Chiropodomys, from southern and southeastern Asia;
- Chiruromys, from New Guinea and adjacent islands;
- Haeromys, from Borneo, the Philippines, and Sulawesi;
- Irenomys, the Chilean tree mouse, from southwestern South America;
- Lorentzimys, the long-footed tree mouse, from New Guinea;
- Platacanthomys, the Malabar spiny tree mouse, from southern India;
- Pogonomys, from New Guinea and northern Australia;
- Prionomys, Dollman's tree mouse, from central Africa;
- Typhlomys, the soft-furred tree mouse, from southern China and Vietnam;
- Vandeleuria, from southern and southeastern Asia.
