= White-toothed brush mouse =

Conservation status
- Data Deficient (IUCN 3.1)

Scientific classification
- Kingdom: Animalia
- Phylum: Chordata
- Class: Mammalia
- Order: Rodentia
- Family: Muridae
- Tribe: Hydromyini
- Genus: Brassomys; Musser & Lunde, 2009
- Species: B. albidens

Binomial name
- Brassomys albidens (Tate, 1951)
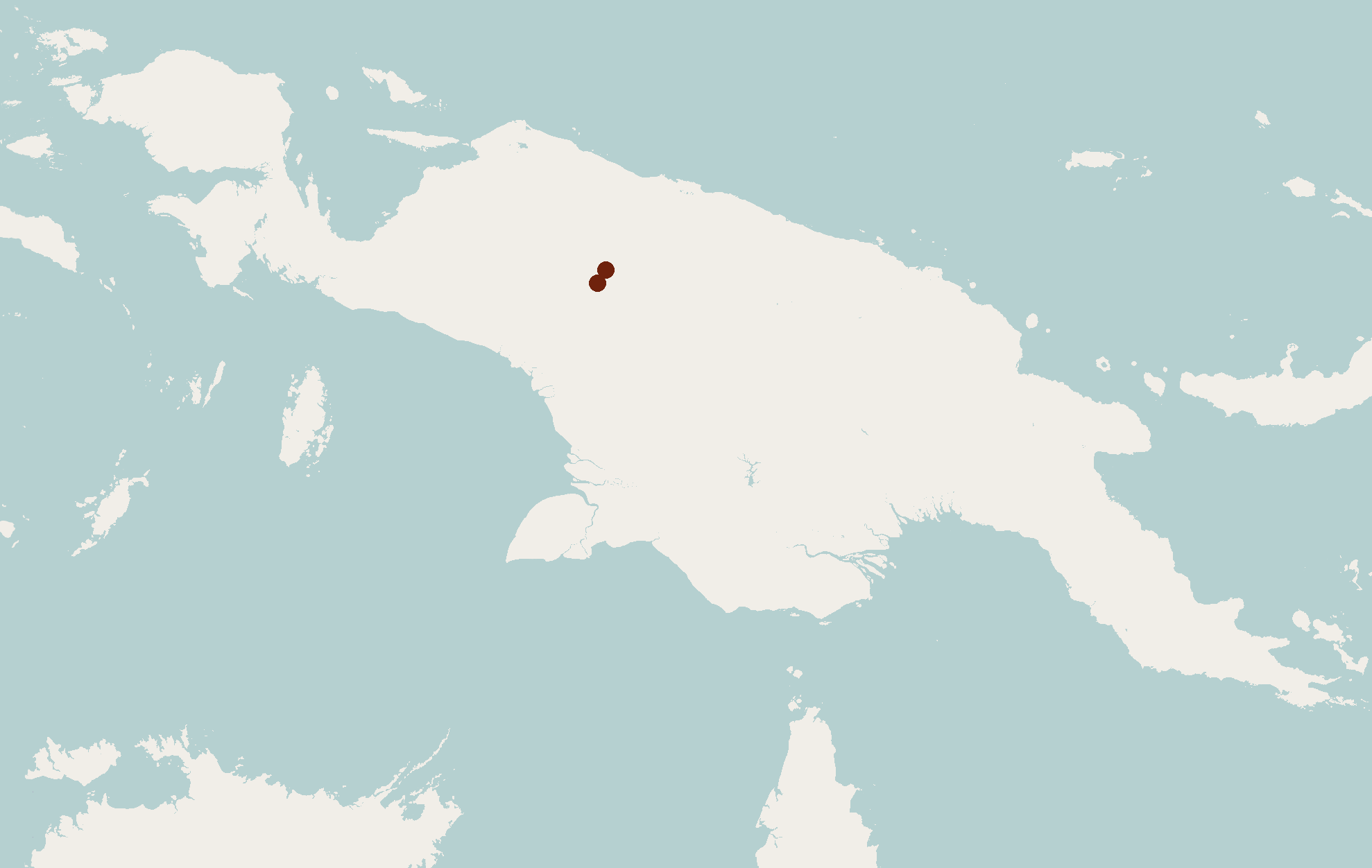
- Distribution of Brassomys albidens

Species of rodent

The white-toothed brush mouse (Brassomys albidens), also known as the white-toothed melomys or white-toothed mouse, is a species of rodent in the family Muridae. It is found only in West Papua, Indonesia. It is the only species in genus Brassomys. Its natural habitats are subtropical or tropical dry forests and subtropical or tropical dry lowland grassland.

The species was initially described in genus Melomys, but was then placed in the genus Coccymys.
