= Banana rat =

Banana rat can refer to:

- A species of rodent from the family Capromyidae, indigenous to Cuba
- A rat species of the genus Melomys
