= Seram long-tailed mosaic-tailed rat =

Conservation status
- Vulnerable (IUCN 3.1)

Scientific classification
- Kingdom: Animalia
- Phylum: Chordata
- Class: Mammalia
- Order: Rodentia
- Family: Muridae
- Genus: Melomys
- Species: M. fulgens

Binomial name
- Melomys fulgens (Thomas, 1920)

Species of rodent

The Seram long-tailed mosaic-tailed rat (Melomys fulgens), also known as the Seram long-tailed melomys, is a species of rodent in the family Muridae. It is found only on the south coast of the island of Seram in Indonesia. At one time it was thought to be a subspecies of the white-bellied mosaic-tailed rat (Melomys leucogaster) but was subsequently raised to full species level. It differs from that species in having a much longer, scale-free tail with a calloused tip which is likely to be prehensile and used while climbing trees.
