= Pavel's Seram mosaic-tailed rat =

Conservation status
- Data Deficient (IUCN 3.1)

Scientific classification
- Kingdom: Animalia
- Phylum: Chordata
- Class: Mammalia
- Order: Rodentia
- Family: Muridae
- Genus: Melomys
- Species: M. paveli

Binomial name
- Melomys paveli Helgen, 2003

Species of rodent

The Pavel's Seram mosaic-tailed rat (Melomys paveli) is a species of rodent in the family Muridae. It is found only on the south coast of the island of Seram in Indonesia. At one time it was thought to be a subspecies of the black-tailed mosaic-tailed rat (Melomys rufescens) but in 2005, Musser and Carleton raised it to full species level. The IUCN has insufficient information on which to assess its conservation status so it is listed as "data deficient".
