= Long-tailed Talaud mosaic-tailed rat =

Conservation status
- Endangered (IUCN 3.1)

Scientific classification
- Kingdom: Animalia
- Phylum: Chordata
- Class: Mammalia
- Order: Rodentia
- Family: Muridae
- Genus: Melomys
- Species: M. talaudium

Binomial name
- Melomys talaudium Thomas, 1921

Species of rodent

The long-tailed Talaud mosaic-tailed rat or the long-tailed Talaud melomys (Melomys talaudium) is a species of rodent in the family Muridae. It is endemic to Karakelong and Salebabu in the Talaud Islands in Indonesia where it occurs in forest habitats. It is morphologically similar to the white-bellied mosaic-tailed rat (Melomys leucogaster) and was at one time considered to be a subspecies but is now recognised as a distinct species. The short-tailed mosaic-tailed rat (Melomys caurinus) is also present on the islands and the shorter tail of that species means that it is likely to be mainly terrestrial whereas M. talaudium is largely arboreal.

The International Union for Conservation of Nature has assessed the conservation status of the long-tailed Talaud mosaic-tailed rat as being "endangered" because its population size is thought to be decreasing, the natural forest on the islands is progressively being cleared, and the total area of occurrence of this species is around 1,000 km^{2} (390 sq mi).
