= Mirzamys =

Scientific classification
- Domain: Eukaryota
- Kingdom: Animalia
- Phylum: Chordata
- Class: Mammalia
- Order: Rodentia
- Family: Muridae
- Tribe: Hydromyini
- Genus: Mirzamys; Helgen & Helgen 2009

Species
- Mirzamys louiseae Mirzamys norahae

Genus of rodents

Mirzamys is a genus of rodent in the family Muridae endemic to New Guinea. It contains the following species:

- Mirza's western moss rat (Mirzamys louiseae)
- Mirza's eastern moss rat (Mirzamys norahae)
