= Snow Mountains grassland mosaic-tailed rat =

Conservation status
- Least Concern (IUCN 3.1)

Scientific classification
- Kingdom: Animalia
- Phylum: Chordata
- Class: Mammalia
- Order: Rodentia
- Family: Muridae
- Genus: Melomys
- Species: M. frigicola

Binomial name
- Melomys frigicola (Tate, 1951)

Species of rodent

The Snow Mountains grassland mosaic-tailed rat (Melomys frigicola), also known as the Snow Mountains grassland melomys, is a species of rodent in the family Muridae. It is endemic to the mountainous west part of the island of New Guinea, where its range extends from Lake Habbema to the Baliem Valley, in Papua Province, Indonesia. It is present at altitudes between 1,600 and 2,200 metres (5,200 and 7,200 ft) above sea level. It is found in grassland and other disturbed areas.

The International Union for Conservation of Nature has assessed its conservation status as being of "least concern" because, although it has a fairly small range, it is plentiful in some areas, can tolerate disturbance to its habitat, and faces no particular threats. Its population may be declining somewhat, but not at a sufficient rate for the IUCN to list it in a more threatened category.
