= Red-bellied mosaic-tailed rat =

Conservation status
- Least Concern (IUCN 3.1)

Scientific classification
- Kingdom: Animalia
- Phylum: Chordata
- Class: Mammalia
- Order: Rodentia
- Family: Muridae
- Tribe: Hydromyini
- Genus: Protochromys; Menzies, 1996
- Species: P. fellowsi

Binomial name
- Protochromys fellowsi (Hinton, 1943)

Species of rodent

The red-bellied mosaic-tailed rat (Protochromys fellowsi) is a species of rodent in the family Muridae. It is the only species in the genus Protochromys. It is found only in Papua New Guinea.
