= Ranee mouse =

Conservation status
- Data Deficient (IUCN 3.1)

Scientific classification
- Kingdom: Animalia
- Phylum: Chordata
- Class: Mammalia
- Order: Rodentia
- Family: Muridae
- Genus: Haeromys
- Species: H. margarettae

Binomial name
- Haeromys margarettae (Thomas, 1893)

Species of rodent

The ranee mouse (Haeromys margarettae) is a species of rodent in the family Muridae. It is restricted to the island of Borneo, in the provinces of Sarawak (Malaysia) and Sabah (Malaysia). Its natural habitat is subtropical or tropical dry forests.
