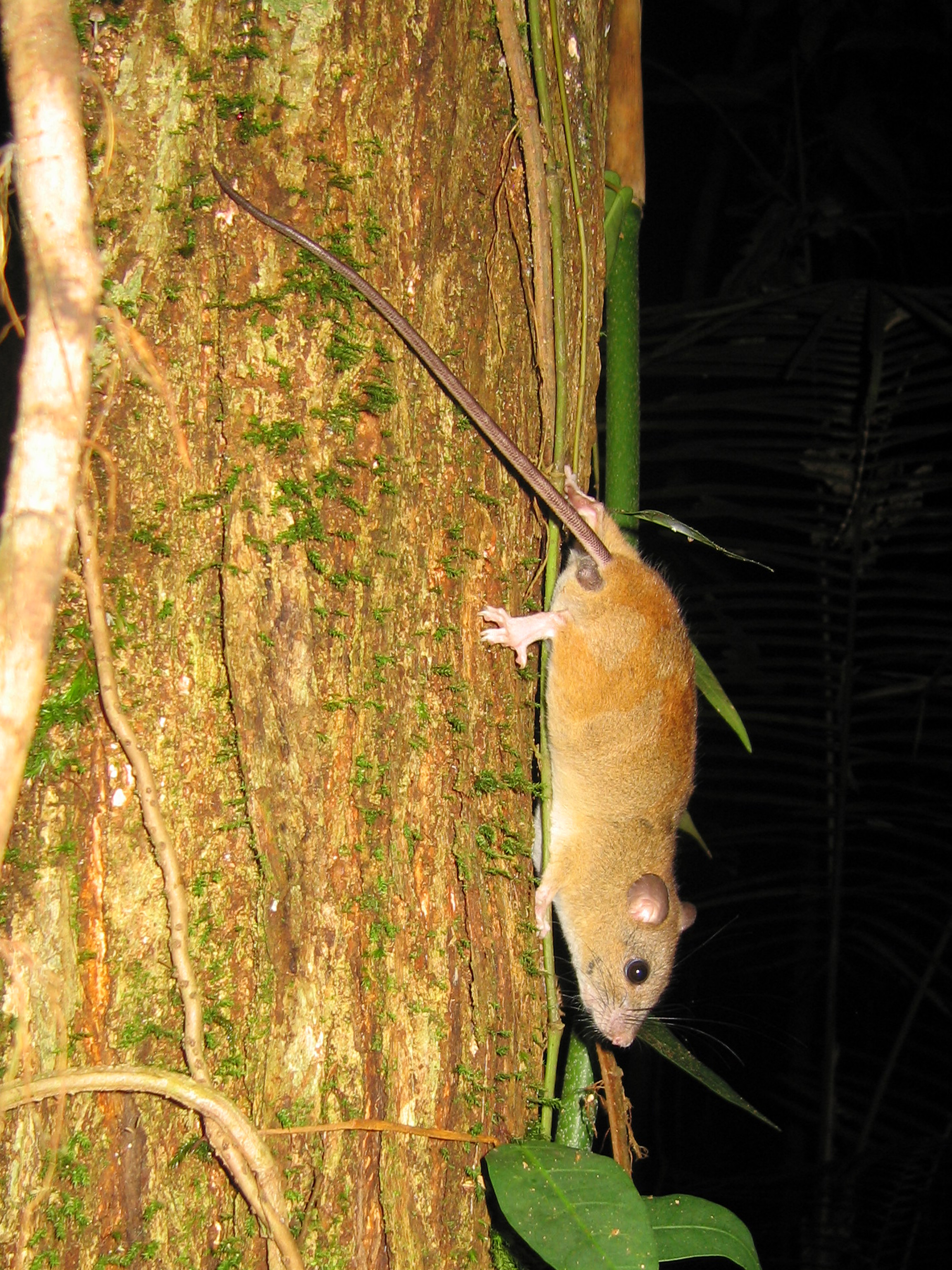
- Fawn-footed mosaic-tailed rat

Conservation status
- Least Concern (IUCN 3.1)

Scientific classification
- Kingdom: Animalia
- Phylum: Chordata
- Class: Mammalia
- Order: Rodentia
- Family: Muridae
- Genus: Melomys
- Species: M. cervinipes

Binomial name
- Melomys cervinipes (Gould, 1852)
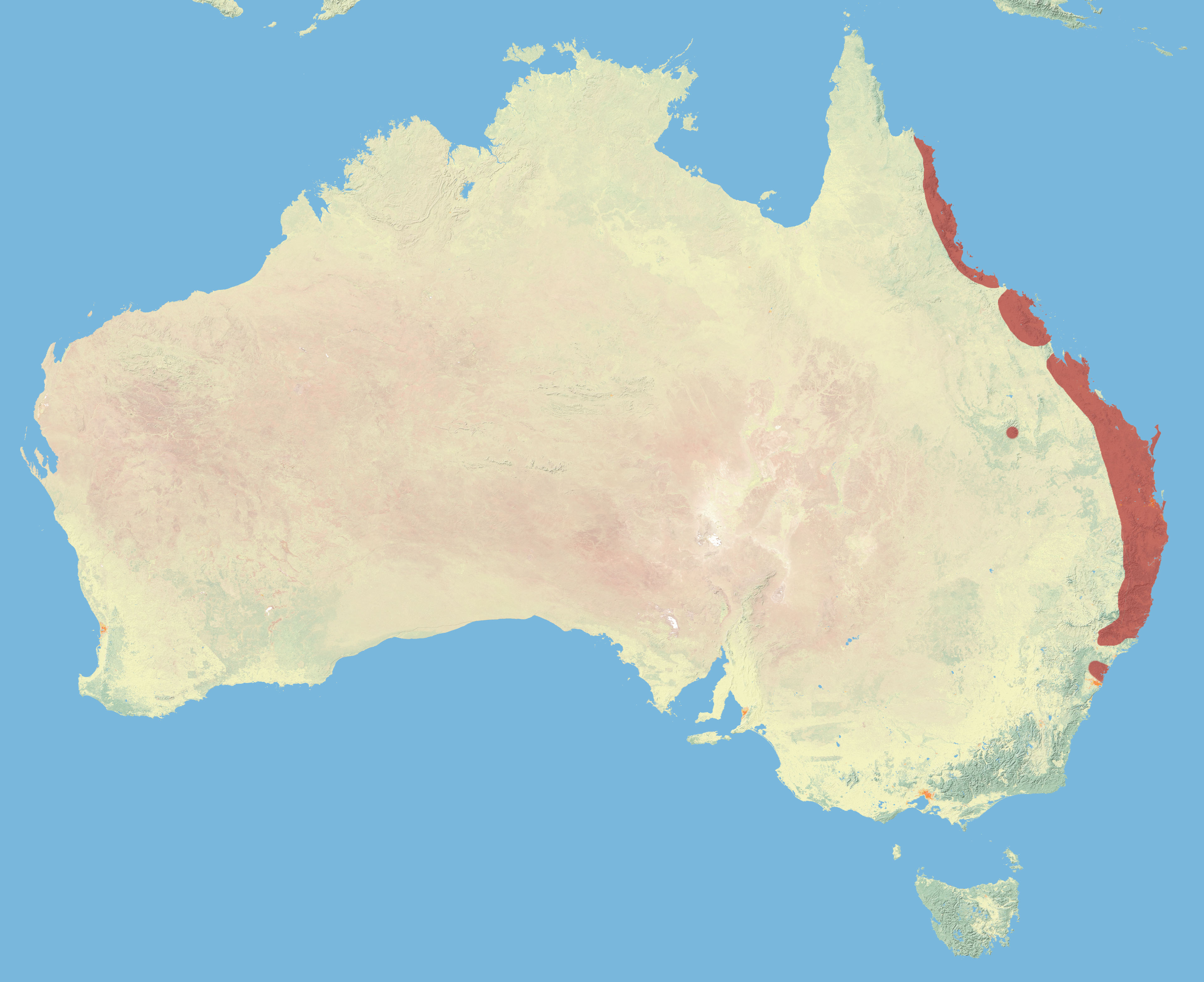

= Fawn-footed mosaic-tailed rat =

Species of rodent

The fawn-footed mosaic-tailed rat, or fawn-footed melomys (Melomys cervinipes) is a species of rodent in the family Muridae. It is found along eastern coastal regions of Australia.

The upper parts of this species are a sandy-brown colour, the mottling at the lower parts is grey and whitish. The tail is hairless, the skin of which has a purplish tone. The superficial distinguishing characteristics include soft and short fur, lacking the long guard hairs of other species and adpressed against the body. John Gould proposed the epithet cervinipes for the "fawn-like colouring" of the feet and tarsi, assigning it to the genus Mus and giving an English name of "Buff-footed Rat".

Gould received his specimens from the early natural history collector Frederick Strange, who labelled the collections as being "Stradbrook Island, Moreton Bay, where it is called Corrill by the natives,—Richmond River, where the Aborigines term it Cunduoo,—and the plains bordering the upper parts of the River Brisbane." This species is commonly known by the descriptive English common name fawn-footed melomys, but during the 1990s proposals emerged to restore indigenous Australian names. Accordingly, in 1995, the Australian Nature Conservation Agency published recommendations for the common names of rodents. They compiled two indigenous Australian names for this species: corrill, recorded from Stradbroke Island; and cunduoo, recorded from the vicinity of the Richmond River. They recommended the adoption of the former of these names, but with the orthography korril. However, this recommendation was not prescriptive, and to what extent it will be adopted remains to be seen.
