= Dusky mosaic-tailed rat =

Conservation status
- Endangered (IUCN 3.1)

Scientific classification
- Kingdom: Animalia
- Phylum: Chordata
- Class: Mammalia
- Order: Rodentia
- Family: Muridae
- Genus: Melomys
- Species: M. aerosus

Binomial name
- Melomys aerosus (Thomas, 1920)

Species of rodent

The dusky mosaic-tailed rat (Melomys aerosus) is a species of rodent in the family Muridae.

== Distribution ==
This rat species is endemic to Seram Island of the Maluku Islands archipelago, in Indonesia.

It is found from 650–1,830 metres (2,130–6,000 ft). It is currently known from three localities: Mount Manusela in Manusela National Park, Mount Hoaulu, and near Kanikeh.
