= Mirza's eastern moss rat =

Conservation status
- Data Deficient (IUCN 3.1)

Scientific classification
- Kingdom: Animalia
- Phylum: Chordata
- Class: Mammalia
- Order: Rodentia
- Family: Muridae
- Genus: Mirzamys
- Species: M. norahae

Binomial name
- Mirzamys norahae K. M. Helgen & L. Helgen, 2009

Species of rodent

Mirza's eastern moss rat (Mirzamys norahae) is a species of rodent endemic to New Guinea.
