= Minahassa ranee mouse =

Conservation status
- Near Threatened (IUCN 3.1)

Scientific classification
- Kingdom: Animalia
- Phylum: Chordata
- Class: Mammalia
- Order: Rodentia
- Family: Muridae
- Genus: Haeromys
- Species: H. minahassae

Binomial name
- Haeromys minahassae (Thomas, 1896)

Species of rodent

The Minahassa ranee mouse (Haeromys minahassae) is a species of rodent in the family Muridae. It is found only on the island of Sulawesi (Indonesia).
