= Coccymys kirrhos =

Scientific classification
- Kingdom: Animalia
- Phylum: Chordata
- Class: Mammalia
- Order: Rodentia
- Family: Muridae
- Genus: Coccymys
- Species: C. kirrhos

Binomial name
- Coccymys kirrhos Musser & Lunde, 2009

Species of rodent

Coccymys kirrhos is a rodent in the family Muridae that is native to New Guinea. The species was described in 2009.
