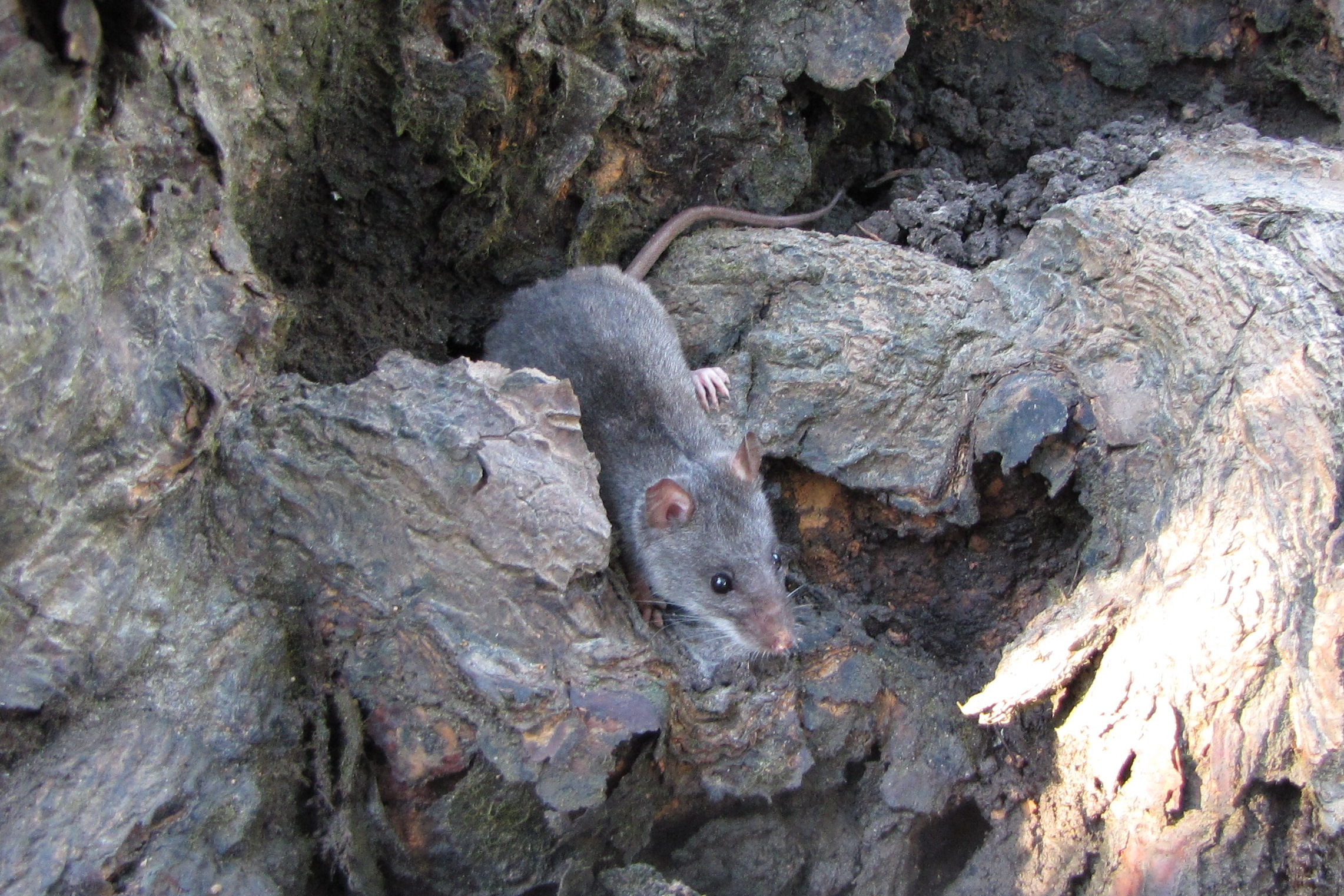

Conservation status
- Vulnerable (IUCN 3.1)
- CITES Appendix II

Scientific classification
- Kingdom: Animalia
- Phylum: Chordata
- Class: Mammalia
- Order: Rodentia
- Family: Muridae
- Subfamily: Murinae
- Tribe: Hydromyini
- Genus: Xeromys; Thomas, 1889
- Species: X. myoides

Binomial name
- Xeromys myoides Thomas, 1889.

= Xeromys myoides =

Species of rodent

Xeromys myoides, also known as the water mouse, marine mouse, mangrove mouse, false water rat, manngay and yirrkoo, is a species of rodent native to waterways of Australia and Papua New Guinea.

== Taxonomy ==
A description of the species was published by Oldfield Thomas in 1889, establishing a new genus Xeromys; recognition as a monotypic genus has been maintained by later authorities. Thomas recognised an affinity with the species Hydromys chrysogaster, the water-rat found in Australia and New Guinea.

A current name used to refer to the species is water mouse. A common name of this species has long been false water-rat, although other names predate these. In 1995 the Australian Nature Conservation Agency released a document in which were recorded two indigenous names for X. myoides, the Murrinh-Patha name manngay and the Mayali and Kunwinjku name yirrku (official Kunwinjku orthography yirrkku). They recommended that the latter name be adopted as the common name, but with the orthography yirrkoo. However, this recommendation was not prescriptive, and it remains to be seen to what extent it will be adopted.

== Description ==
False water rats have markedly long, flattened heads with small eyes and short, rounded ears that are 10 to 14 millimetres in length. These rats possess just two molars on each side of the upper and lower jaw. Their upper incisors are yellow or orange and the lower incisors are white. The head and body length is approximately 100 mm and characterised by a hunched body shape, the recorded size range is from 85 to 120 mm. The tail length is 85–100 mm and the hind-foot length is 23–26 mm. The body fur is water-resistant and dark gray, which gradually blends into the white underside, the hair is short and lustrous. The hands and feet are covered with fine, white hairs. Their feet are not webbed like other water rats (Hydromys chrysogaster), which gives them their common name "false" water rat. The tail is sparsely haired and lacks the white tip found in the more common water rat. In addition, the tails of these rats are scaled. The average weight is 42 grams, and may vary from 35 to 55 g. This murid species has a total of four teats, two pairs at the inguinal region. They exude a strong musky odour.

X. myoides resembles no other species found within its habitat.

== Distribution and habitat ==
The false water rat (Xeromys myoides) lives in Australia and Papua New Guinea. Once believed to be restricted to Southeast Queensland and the Northern Territory, the false water rat has subsequently been found in the central and southern parts of Queensland, North Stradbroke Island off the coast of Southeast Queensland, Melville Island, and southwest Western Province, Papua New Guinea.

False water rats primarily live in mangrove communities and shallow areas surrounding lagoons, swamps, and lakes. The water may be saline or fresh. Their nests are made at the base of mangrove trees. Their nests are very similar to termite mounds. They are made of leaves, mud, and may be as high as 60 centimetres. There is usually one opening and on the inside it is a complex system of tunnels which connects to multiple chambers. Since the tunnels are very complex sometimes the homes can overlap. This behaviour shows that they are social and very friendly. Because of their lack of webbed feet and their inability to swim, their nests are generally built near shallow water. This allows them to wade in water instead of swimming and diving in search of their food.

== Diet ==
False water rats appear to depend on mangrove and intertidal salt marsh habitats for food. Their diet consists of invertebrates such as crabs, small mud lobsters, marine shellfish, snails and worms. They generally eat during the night and rest during the day. Their estimated home range used for foraging is 0.8 ha for males and 0.6 ha for females; however they can travel for up to 2.9 km each night.

== Life cycle and reproduction ==
Little is known about the life cycle and breeding patterns of this species. Since their food and nutrients are generally found amongst the mangroves, the lifespan of the false water rat is highly dependent upon the preservation of the mangrove forest. It is believed that they breed throughout the year with only two young per litter. Up to eight individuals of various ages (young and old) and either sex live in a nest, with usually only one sexually active adult male present and several females.

== Predators and threats ==
=== Human impact ===
The loss, degradation, and fragmentation of their inter-tidal wetland communities is most significant. Due to human activity, their habitat is severely fragmented and less than 2,000 km. Urban expansion in Queensland resulted in some wetland habitats being cleared or modified. The quality of their habitat and area of occupancy continue to decline primarily due to the development of mangrove areas. Increasing development creates oil pollution, wastewater and acid sulphate contamination, alteration of natural hydrology, and increasing infections from chemicals and waste. The destruction of their habitat as a result of water quality changes due to agriculture, livestock grazing, urbanisation, and swamp drainage. Due to these circumstances, they are classified as vulnerable.

=== Physical ===
Natural fluctuations in sea level result in altered patterns of vegetation zones between saltmarsh, mangrove and terrestrial communities. Floodplain wetlands in northern Australia are susceptible to rising sea level due to climate change.

=== Biological ===
There are several predators to the false water rat including foxes, cats, carpet pythons, rough-scaled snakes, tawny frogmouths, and pigs. Degradation of habitat from hard-hoofed animals (e.g. pigs) and competition for food resources directly impact the water mouse.

== Protection ==
False water rats do not appear to negatively affect man or the human economy and they have no known positive economic importance for man other than playing a role in maintaining the ecological stability of the marine population they feed on, indirectly affecting local marine-related industries and the land. Through the years, man has been careless with the release of pollutants and other waste products thereby causing a decrease in the habitat for these animals. Paying particular attention, creating, promoting and maintaining environmentally safe processes surrounding excavation and construction, garbage and waste products elimination, chemicals and extracts usage, as well natural and unnatural predators will increase the survival chances of the false water rat. In addition, conservation of the wetlands and mangroves will not only prevent extinction of the false water rat and other animals but it will protect our shores from wave action, reduce the impacts of floods and absorb natural pollutants and provide habitat for animals and plants.
