= Mimic tree rat =

Conservation status
- Least Concern (IUCN 3.1)

Scientific classification
- Kingdom: Animalia
- Phylum: Chordata
- Class: Mammalia
- Order: Rodentia
- Family: Muridae
- Subfamily: Murinae
- Tribe: Hydromyini
- Genus: Xenuromys; Tate & Archbold, 1941
- Species: X. barbatus

Binomial name
- Xenuromys barbatus (Milne-Edwards, 1900)

Species of rodent

The mimic tree rat, rock-dwelling giant rat, or rock-dwelling rat (Xenuromys barbatus) is a species of rodent in the family Muridae found in West Papua, Indonesia and Papua New Guinea.
