= Buka Island mosaic-tailed rat =

Scientific classification
- Kingdom: Animalia
- Phylum: Chordata
- Class: Mammalia
- Order: Rodentia
- Family: Muridae
- Genus: Melomys
- Species: M. spechti

Binomial name
- Melomys spechti Flannery and Wickler, 1990

Species of rodent

The Buka Island mosaic-tailed rat or Buka Island melomys (Melomys spechti) is a species of rat in Oceania.

It is endemic to Buka Island, in the Autonomous Region of Bougainville in northeastern Papua New Guinea.
