= Highland brush mouse =

Conservation status
- Least Concern (IUCN 3.1)

Scientific classification
- Kingdom: Animalia
- Phylum: Chordata
- Class: Mammalia
- Order: Rodentia
- Family: Muridae
- Tribe: Hydromyini
- Genus: Abeomelomys; Menzies, 1990
- Species: A. sevia

Binomial name
- Abeomelomys sevia (Tate & Archbold, 1935)

Synonyms
- Pogonomelomys sevia

Species of rodent

The highland brush mouse (Abeomelomys sevia), also known as the Menzies' mouse, is a species of rodent in the family Muridae. It is endemic to the New Guinea Highlands (Papua New Guinea) where it is found in montane moss forests and in alpine zones over 2,000 m. It is the only species in the genus Abeomelomys, although it has been placed in Pogonomelomys in the past.

== Names ==
It is known as ymgenm [jí.mɨŋɡé.nɨ́m] (or yamganm [já.mɨŋɡá.nɨ́m]) in the Kalam language of Papua New Guinea.
