= Riama mosaic-tailed rat =

Conservation status
- Data Deficient (IUCN 3.1)

Scientific classification
- Kingdom: Animalia
- Phylum: Chordata
- Class: Mammalia
- Order: Rodentia
- Family: Muridae
- Genus: Melomys
- Species: M. howi

Binomial name
- Melomys howi Kitchener, 1996

Species of rodent

The Riama mosaic-tailed rat (Melomys howi), is a species of rodent in the family Muridae. It is found only on the island of Riama in Indonesia, a small island to the west of Selaru in the Tanimbar Islands. Very little is known about this species, but it may also be present on some of the other islands in this group.

The Riama mosaic-tailed rat is closely related and similar in appearance to the Papua grassland mosaic-tailed rat (M. lutillus). The International Union for Conservation of Nature has insufficient information on which to assess the conservation status of the Riama mosaic-tailed rat, so it is listed as "data deficient".
