= Mammelomys =

Scientific classification
- Domain: Eukaryota
- Kingdom: Animalia
- Phylum: Chordata
- Class: Mammalia
- Order: Rodentia
- Family: Muridae
- Tribe: Hydromyini
- Genus: Mammelomys; Menzies, 1996

Type species
- Melomys rattoides

Species
- Mammelomys lanosus Mammelomys rattoides

Genus of rodents

Mammelomys is a genus of rodent in the family Muridae endemic to New Guinea. It contains the following species:

Genus Mammelomys

- Large-scaled mosaic-tailed rat, Mammelomys lanosus
- Large mosaic-tailed rat, Mammelomys rattoides
