= Manus Island mosaic-tailed rat =

Conservation status
- Endangered (IUCN 3.1)

Scientific classification
- Kingdom: Animalia
- Phylum: Chordata
- Class: Mammalia
- Order: Rodentia
- Family: Muridae
- Genus: Melomys
- Species: M. matambuai

Binomial name
- Melomys matambuai Flannery, Colgan & Trimble, 1994

Species of rodent

The Manus Island mosaic-tailed rat or Manus melomys (Melomys matambuai) is a species of rodent in the family Muridae. It is endemic to the island of Manus in Papua New Guinea where it occurs in forest habitats and is largely arboreal.

The International Union for Conservation of Nature has assessed its conservation status as being "endangered" because the natural forest on the island is progressively being cleared and the total area of occurrence of this species is less than 1,800 km^{2} (690 sq mi).
