= Haeromys =

Scientific classification
- Domain: Eukaryota
- Kingdom: Animalia
- Phylum: Chordata
- Class: Mammalia
- Order: Rodentia
- Family: Muridae
- Tribe: Hydromyini
- Genus: Haeromys; Thomas, 1911

Type species
- Mus margarettae

Species
- Haeromys margarettae; Haeromys minahassae; Haeromys pusillus

Genus of rodents

Haeromys is a genus of rodent in the family Muridae endemic to Southeast Asia. It contains the following species:

- Ranee mouse (Haeromys margarettae)
- Minahassa ranee mouse (Haeromys minahassae)
- Lesser ranee mouse (Haeromys pusillus)
