= Mirza's western moss rat =

Scientific classification
- Kingdom: Animalia
- Phylum: Chordata
- Class: Mammalia
- Order: Rodentia
- Family: Muridae
- Genus: Mirzamys
- Species: M. louiseae

Binomial name
- Mirzamys louiseae K. M. Helgen & L. Helgen, 2009

Species of rodent

Mirza's western moss rat (Mirzamys louiseae) is a species of rodent endemic to Papua New Guinea.
