= Lesser small-toothed rat =

Conservation status
- Data Deficient (IUCN 3.1)

Scientific classification
- Kingdom: Animalia
- Phylum: Chordata
- Class: Mammalia
- Order: Rodentia
- Family: Muridae
- Genus: Macruromys
- Species: M. elegans

Binomial name
- Macruromys elegans Stein, 1933

Species of rodent

The lesser small-toothed rat or western small-toothed rat (Macruromys elegans) is a species of rodent in the family Muridae. It is found only in West Papua, Indonesia.
