= Macruromys =

Scientific classification
- Domain: Eukaryota
- Kingdom: Animalia
- Phylum: Chordata
- Class: Mammalia
- Order: Rodentia
- Family: Muridae
- Subfamily: Murinae
- Tribe: Hydromyini
- Genus: Macruromys; Stein, 1933

Type species
- Macruromys elegans

Species
- Macruromys elegans Macruromys major

Genus of rodents

Macruromys is a genus of rodent in the family Muridae endemic to New Guinea. It contains the following species:

- Lesser small-toothed rat (M. elegans)
- Eastern small-toothed rat (M. major)
