= Coccymys =

Scientific classification
- Domain: Eukaryota
- Kingdom: Animalia
- Phylum: Chordata
- Class: Mammalia
- Order: Rodentia
- Family: Muridae
- Tribe: Hydromyini
- Genus: Coccymys; Menzies, 1990

Type species
- Pogonomelomys ruemmleri

Genus of rodents

Coccymys is a genus of rodent in the family Muridae endemic to Indonesia and Papua New Guinea. It contains the following species:

- Coccymys kirrhos
- Rümmler's brush mouse (Coccymys ruemmleri)
- Coccymys shawmayeri

The genus previously included the White-toothed brush mouse (Brassomys albidens).
