= Short-tailed Talaud mosaic-tailed rat =

Conservation status
- Endangered (IUCN 3.1)

Scientific classification
- Kingdom: Animalia
- Phylum: Chordata
- Class: Mammalia
- Order: Rodentia
- Family: Muridae
- Genus: Melomys
- Species: M. caurinus

Binomial name
- Melomys caurinus Thomas, 1921

Species of rodent

The short-tailed Talaud mosaic-tailed rat or the short-tailed Talaud melomys (Melomys caurinus) is a species of rodent in the family Muridae. It is endemic to Karakelong and Salebabu in the Talaud Islands in Indonesia where it occurs in forest habitats. The long-tailed Talaud mosaic-tailed rat (Melomys talaudium) is also present on the islands and the shorter tail of this species means that it is likely to be mainly terrestrial whereas M. talaudium is largely arboreal.

The International Union for Conservation of Nature has assessed its conservation status as being "endangered" because its population size is thought to be decreasing, the natural forest on the island is progressively being cleared, and the total area of occurrence of this species is around 1,000 km^{2} (390 sq mi).
