= Cape York melomys =

Cape York mosaic-tailed rat

Conservation status
- Least Concern (IUCN 3.1)

Scientific classification
- Kingdom: Animalia
- Phylum: Chordata
- Class: Mammalia
- Order: Rodentia
- Family: Muridae
- Genus: Melomys
- Species: M. capensis

Binomial name
- Melomys capensis Tate, 1951

Species of rodent

The Cape York mosaic-tailed rat, or Cape York melomys (Melomys capensis) is a species of rodent in the family Muridae. It is endemic to the Cape York Peninsula of northern Australia.
