= Lesser ranee mouse =

Conservation status
- Vulnerable (IUCN 3.1)

Scientific classification
- Kingdom: Animalia
- Phylum: Chordata
- Class: Mammalia
- Order: Rodentia
- Family: Muridae
- Genus: Haeromys
- Species: H. pusillus

Binomial name
- Haeromys pusillus (Thomas, 1893)
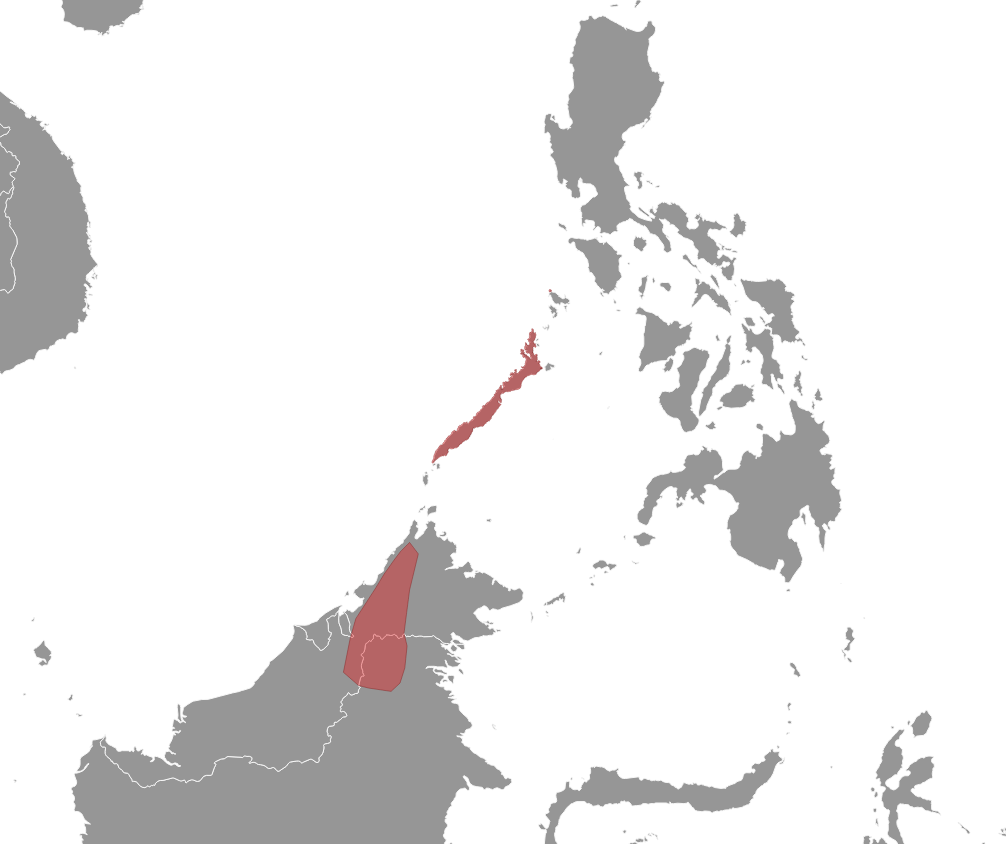

Species of rodent

The lesser ranee mouse (Haeromys pusillus) is a species of rodent in the family Muridae. It is found on the island of Borneo and the Palawan region (Philippines). Its natural habitat is subtropical or tropical dry forests.
