= Obi mosaic-tailed rat =

Conservation status
- Least Concern (IUCN 3.1)

Scientific classification
- Kingdom: Animalia
- Phylum: Chordata
- Class: Mammalia
- Order: Rodentia
- Family: Muridae
- Genus: Melomys
- Species: M. obiensis

Binomial name
- Melomys obiensis (Thomas, 1911)

Species of rodent

The Obi mosaic-tailed rat (Melomys obiensis) is a species of rodent in the family Muridae. It is found only in Indonesia.
