= Coccymys shawmayeri =

Scientific classification
- Kingdom: Animalia
- Phylum: Chordata
- Class: Mammalia
- Order: Rodentia
- Family: Muridae
- Genus: Coccymys
- Species: C. shawmayeri

Binomial name
- Coccymys shawmayeri Musser & Lunde, 2009

Species of rodent

Coccymys shawmayeri is a rodent in the family of Muridae native to New Guinea. The species was described in 2009.
