= Eastern small-toothed rat =

Conservation status
- Least Concern (IUCN 3.1)

Scientific classification
- Kingdom: Animalia
- Phylum: Chordata
- Class: Mammalia
- Order: Rodentia
- Family: Muridae
- Genus: Macruromys
- Species: M. major

Binomial name
- Macruromys major Rümmler, 1935

Species of rodent

The eastern small-toothed rat (Macruromys major) is a species of rodent in the family Muridae. It is found in West Papua, Indonesia and Papua New Guinea.
