= Bannister's rat =

Conservation status
- Endangered (IUCN 3.1)

Scientific classification
- Kingdom: Animalia
- Phylum: Chordata
- Class: Mammalia
- Order: Rodentia
- Family: Muridae
- Genus: Melomys
- Species: M. bannisteri

Binomial name
- Melomys bannisteri Kitchener & Maryanto, 1993

Species of rodent

Bannister's rat, or great Key Island mosaic-tailed rat, or great Key Island melomys or great Kai Island melomys (Melomys bannisteri) is a species of rodent of the genus Melomys. It is endemic to the Kai Besar, one of the islands which are part of the Maluku Islands, Indonesia.
