= Yamdena mosaic-tailed rat =

Conservation status
- Data Deficient (IUCN 3.1)

Scientific classification
- Kingdom: Animalia
- Phylum: Chordata
- Class: Mammalia
- Order: Rodentia
- Family: Muridae
- Genus: Melomys
- Species: M. cooperae

Binomial name
- Melomys cooperae Kitchener, 1995

Species of rodent

The Yamdena mosaic-tailed rat (Melomys cooperae) is a species of rat belonging to the family Muridae. It was first described in 1995 from specimens found on Yamdena Island in Indonesia. No other examples of this species have been found; as a result very little is known about it. IUCN lists it as Data Deficient.

== Appearance ==
The species is of medium size with a maximum recorded weight range of 64.5 to 96.5 g and a head and body length of between 118 and 140 mm. The upper parts are cinnamon-brown, with blackish reflections on the nose and forehead and white cheeks. There are blackish rings around the eyes. The ventral parts, interior parts of the limbs and the back of the legs are white. The ears are short and cinnamon in colour. The tail is longer than the head and body (140 – 170 mm), and is lavender-grey on top and pale grey below.

It is distinguished from other members of the genus Melomys by last upper molar being longer and a “combination of very long tail, long incisive foramen and distinctive white cheeks".
