= Large mosaic-tailed rat =

Mammelomys rattoides

Conservation status
- Least Concern (IUCN 3.1)

Scientific classification
- Kingdom: Animalia
- Phylum: Chordata
- Class: Mammalia
- Order: Rodentia
- Family: Muridae
- Genus: Mammelomys
- Species: M. rattoides

Binomial name
- Mammelomys rattoides (Thomas, 1922)

Synonyms
- Melomys rattoides Thomas, 1922

Species of mammal

The large mosaic-tailed rat (Mammelomys rattoides) is a species of rodent in the family Muridae. It is found in West Papua, Indonesia and Papua New Guinea.
