= Papua grassland mosaic-tailed rat =

Conservation status
- Least Concern (IUCN 3.1)

Scientific classification
- Kingdom: Animalia
- Phylum: Chordata
- Class: Mammalia
- Order: Rodentia
- Family: Muridae
- Genus: Melomys
- Species: M. lutillus

Binomial name
- Melomys lutillus (Thomas, 1913)

Species of rodent

The Papua grassland mosaic-tailed rat (Melomys lutillus), also known as the grassland melomys, is a species of rodent in the family Muridae. It is endemic to the island of New Guinea where it is present from sea level to altitudes of about 2,200 metres (7,200 ft). It inhabits grassland, gardens and other disturbed areas.

The International Union for Conservation of Nature has assessed its conservation status as being of "least concern". This is because it has a wide range, can tolerate disturbance to its habitat and no particular threats have been identified.
