= New Guinean jumping mouse =

Conservation status
- Least Concern (IUCN 3.1)

Scientific classification
- Kingdom: Animalia
- Phylum: Chordata
- Class: Mammalia
- Order: Rodentia
- Family: Muridae
- Subfamily: Murinae
- Tribe: Hydromyini
- Genus: Lorentzimys; Jentink, 1911
- Species: L. nouhuysi

Binomial name
- Lorentzimys nouhuysi Jentink, 1911

Species of rodent

The New Guinean jumping mouse (Lorentzimys nouhuysi) is a species of rodent in the family Muridae. It is found in West Papua, Indonesia and Papua New Guinea.
