= Rümmler's brush mouse =

Conservation status
- Least Concern (IUCN 3.1)

Scientific classification
- Kingdom: Animalia
- Phylum: Chordata
- Class: Mammalia
- Order: Rodentia
- Family: Muridae
- Genus: Coccymys
- Species: C. ruemmleri

Binomial name
- Coccymys ruemmleri (Tate & Archbold, 1941)

Species of rodent

Rümmler's brush mouse or Rümmler's mouse (Coccymys ruemmleri) is a species of rodent in the family Muridae. It is found in Indonesia and Papua New Guinea. Its natural habitats are subtropical or tropical moist montane forests and subtropical or tropical high-altitude grassland.
