= Grassland mosaic-tailed rat =

Conservation status
- Least Concern (IUCN 3.1)

Scientific classification
- Kingdom: Animalia
- Phylum: Chordata
- Class: Mammalia
- Order: Rodentia
- Family: Muridae
- Genus: Melomys
- Species: M. burtoni

Binomial name
- Melomys burtoni (Ramsay, 1887)

Species of rodent

The grassland mosaic-tailed rat, or grassland melomys (Melomys burtoni), is a species of rodent in the family Muridae. It is found in Australia and Papua New Guinea. In Australia it is found along the northern coast from Kimberley to New South Wales. In the Top End it is often found in Pandanus (P. spiralis). Kunwinjku of western Arnhem Land call this animal mulbbu.
