= Bougainville mosaic-tailed rat =

Conservation status
- Data Deficient (IUCN 3.1)

Scientific classification
- Kingdom: Animalia
- Phylum: Chordata
- Class: Mammalia
- Order: Rodentia
- Family: Muridae
- Genus: Melomys
- Species: M. bougainville

Binomial name
- Melomys bougainville Troughton, 1936

Species of rodent

The Bougainville mosaic-tailed rat (Melomys bougainville) is a species of rodent in the family Muridae.

It is found only in Papua New Guinea.
