= Large-scaled mosaic-tailed rat =

Conservation status
- Least Concern (IUCN 3.1)

Scientific classification
- Kingdom: Animalia
- Phylum: Chordata
- Class: Mammalia
- Order: Rodentia
- Family: Muridae
- Genus: Mammelomys
- Species: M. lanosus

Binomial name
- Mammelomys lanosus (Thomas, 1922)

Synonyms
- Melomys lanosus Thomas, 1922

Species of rodent

The large-scaled mosaic-tailed rat (Mammelomys lanosus) is a species of rodent in the family Muridae. It is found in West Papua, Indonesia and Papua New Guinea.
