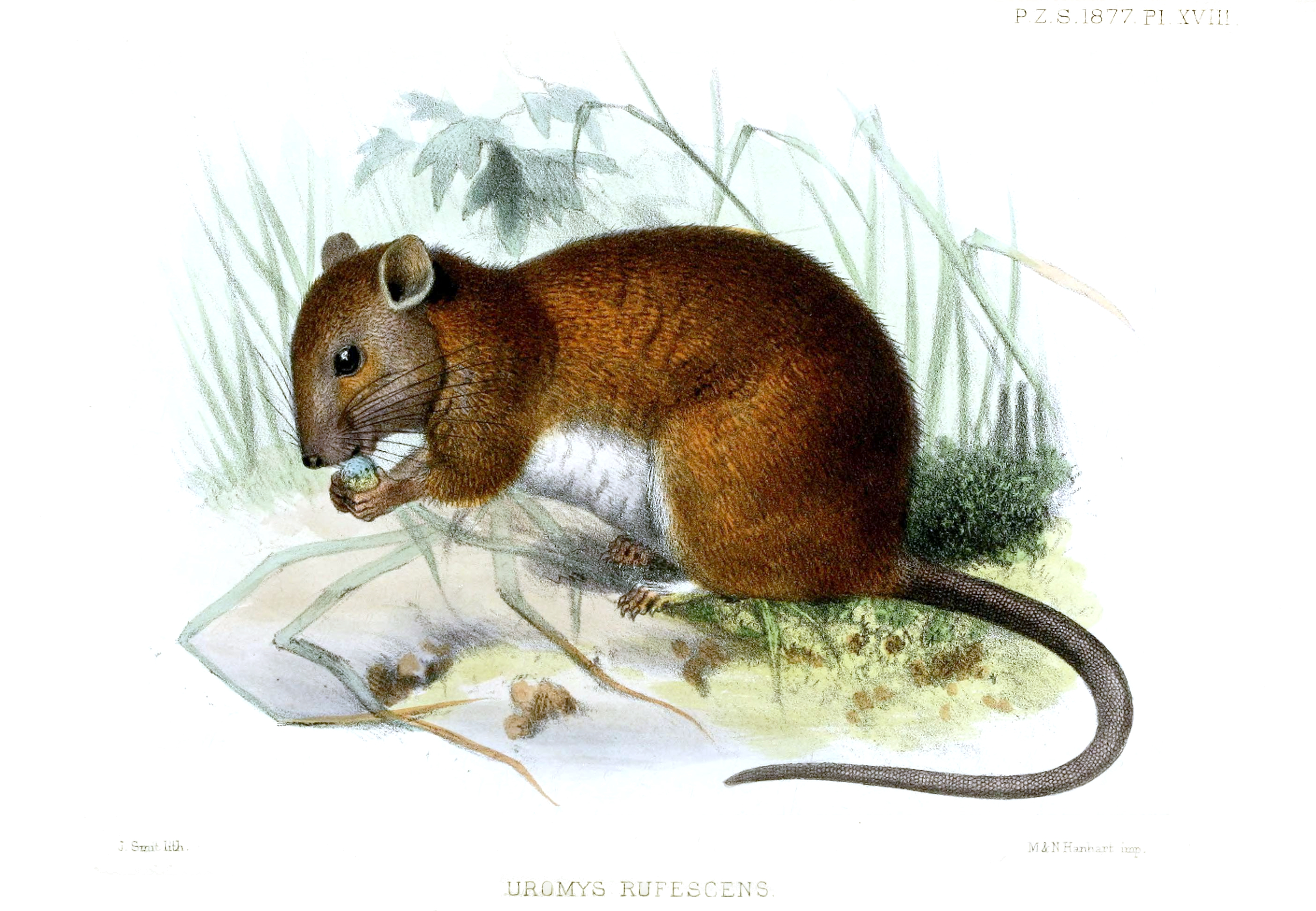

Conservation status
- Least Concern (IUCN 3.1)

Scientific classification
- Kingdom: Animalia
- Phylum: Chordata
- Class: Mammalia
- Order: Rodentia
- Family: Muridae
- Genus: Melomys
- Species: M. rufescens

Binomial name
- Melomys rufescens (Alston, 1877)

Synonyms
- M. gracilis (Thomas, 1906)

= Black-tailed mosaic-tailed rat =

Species of rodent

The black-tailed mosaic-tailed rat or black-tailed melomys (Melomys rufescens) is a species of rodent in the family Muridae. It is found through much of New Guinea and also on some nearby islands, namely Salawati and Misool (Indonesia), and the Bismarck Archipelago (including New Britain and New Ireland).

== Names ==
It is known as alks in the Kalam language of Papua New Guinea.

== Habitat ==
This species is common in disturbed habitat and in primary forest at elevations up to 2,400 m (7,900 ft) above sea level. It is largely arboreal.
