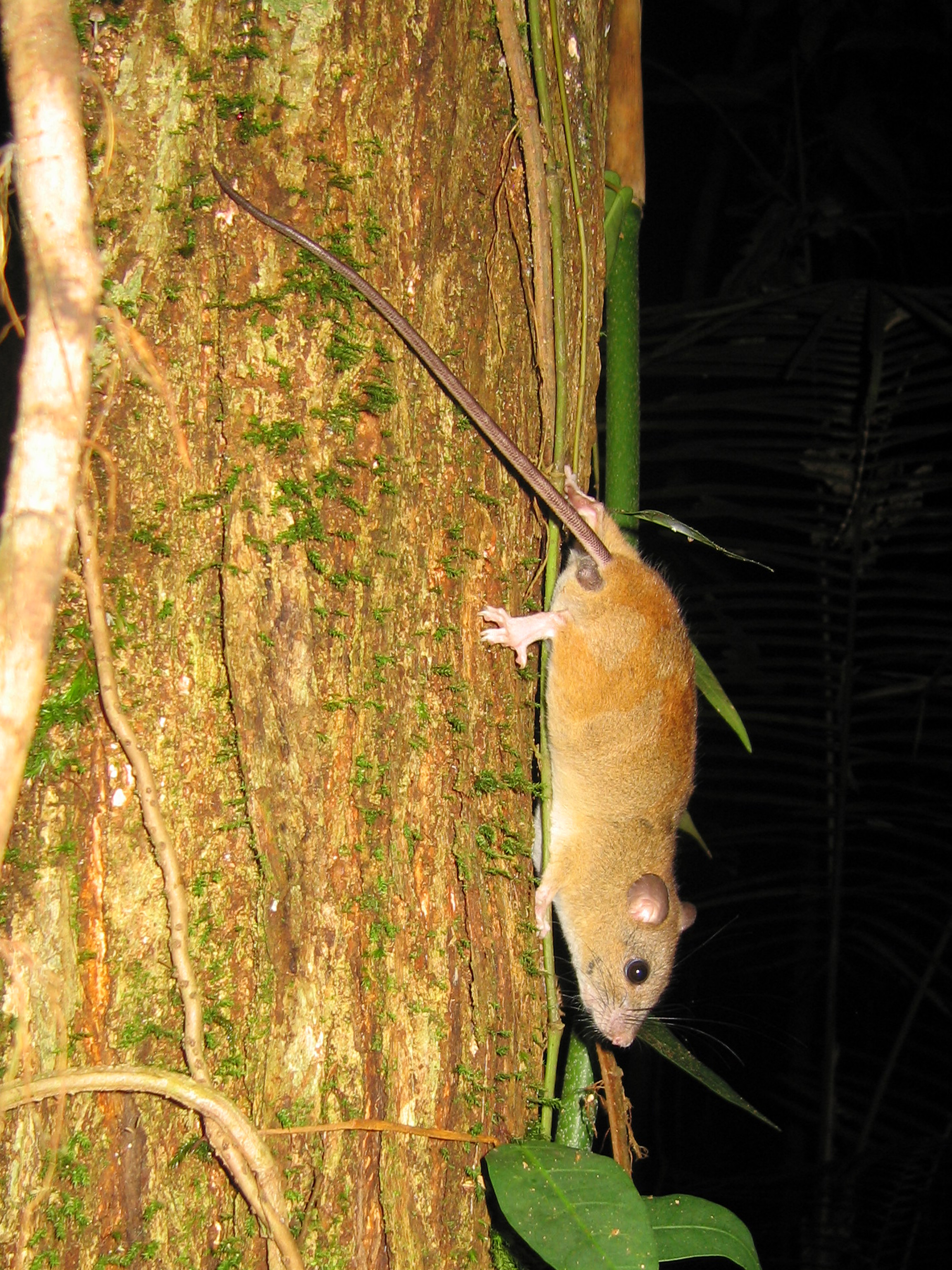
- Melomys cervinipes

Scientific classification
- Domain: Eukaryota
- Kingdom: Animalia
- Phylum: Chordata
- Class: Mammalia
- Order: Rodentia
- Family: Muridae
- Tribe: Hydromyini
- Genus: Melomys; Thomas, 1922

Type species
- Uromys rufescens

Species
- See text

= Melomys =

Melomys Temporal range: Pleistocene to recent

Genus of rodents

Melomys is a genus of rodents in the family Muridae. Members of this genus live in the wet habitats of northern Australia (Far North Queensland), New Guinea, Torres Strait Islands and islands of the Indonesian archipelago.

== Species ==
The genus contains the following species:

- Dusky mosaic-tailed rat (Melomys aerosus)
- Rossel Island mosaic-tailed rat (Melomys arcium)
- Bannister's rat (Melomys bannisteri)
- Bougainville mosaic-tailed rat (Melomys bougainville)
- Grassland mosaic-tailed rat (Melomys burtoni)
- Cape York mosaic-tailed rat (Melomys capensis)
- Short-tailed Talaud mosaic-tailed rat (Melomys caurinus)
- Fawn-footed mosaic-tailed rat (Melomys cervinipes)
- Yamdena mosaic-tailed rat (Melomys cooperae)
- Dollman's mosaic-tailed rat (Melomys dollmani)
- Manusela mosaic-tailed rat (Melomys fraterculus)
- Snow Mountains grassland mosaic-tailed rat (Melomys frigicola)
- Seram long-tailed mosaic-tailed rat (Melomys fulgens)
- Riama mosaic-tailed rat (Melomys howi)
- White-bellied mosaic-tailed rat (Melomys leucogaster)
- Papua grassland mosaic-tailed rat (Melomys lutillus)
- Manus Island mosaic-tailed rat (Melomys matambuai)
- Obi mosaic-tailed rat (Melomys obiensis)
- Pavel's Seram mosaic-tailed rat (Melomys paveli)
- †Bramble Cay mosaic-tailed rat (Melomys rubicola) – considered the only mammal endemic to the Great Barrier Reef and represents the first documented mammal extinction (2016, confirmed 2019) due to climate change
- Black-tailed mosaic-tailed rat (Melomys rufescens)
- Buka Island mosaic-tailed rat (Melomys spechti)
- Long-tailed Talaud mosaic-tailed rat (Melomys talaudium)
