= White-bellied mosaic-tailed rat =

Conservation status
- Least Concern (IUCN 3.1)

Scientific classification
- Kingdom: Animalia
- Phylum: Chordata
- Class: Mammalia
- Order: Rodentia
- Family: Muridae
- Genus: Melomys
- Species: M. leucogaster

Binomial name
- Melomys leucogaster (Jentink, 1908)

Species of rodent

The white-bellied mosaic-tailed rat (Melomys leucogaster) is a species of rodent in the family Muridae. It is found in West Papua, Indonesia and Papua New Guinea.
