= Crump (surname) =

Crump is an ancient surname of noble Anglo-Norman origin. The name can also be a derivative of "Crompton", a name given for a medieval town near Shaw, England, for its "crumpled" geographical features. The name was first given to a branch of descendants of Lord Gislebertus Venator, the "de Crompton" family. Gilbert, being a scion of Blois and cousin-German to the conqueror, was given dominion over the area as a palatine baron for his valiant support in the Norman Conquest of 1066. The first person in the family to use this surname was Sir Piers de Crompton, who was born in 1161 and knighted in 1183 at the age of 22.

Crump can also be traced as a medieval English, Danish, Irish, French surname, meaning "crippled man".

Other derivatives of this family name are speculated to include, but are not limited to: Crompe, Crumpton, Crumpe, Cromp, and Krump.

Notable people and characters with the surname include:

- Amanda Crump (born 1989), English football player
- Barry Crump (1935–1996), New Zealand writer
- Benjamin Crump (born 1969), American lawyer
- Brian Crump (born 1938), British cricketer
- Bruce Crump (1957–2015), drummer with the rock band Molly Hatchet
- Buck Crump (1904–1989), Canadian businessman
- Charles Crump (cricketer) (1837–1912), New Zealand cricketer
- Charles Crump (footballer) (1840–1923), English football player, administrator, and referee
- David Crump, American legal scholar
- Diane Crump (1948–2026), American jockey and horse trainer
- E. H. Crump (1874–1954), American politician from Tennessee
- Edwin Samuel Crump (1882–1961), English civil engineer specialising in hydraulics
- George Arthur Crump (1871–1918), American hotelier and golf course architect
- George J. Crump (1841–1928), lawyer, Confederate officer, state legislator and U.S. Marshal in Arkansas
- George William Crump (1786–1848), American politician
- Harry Crump (American football) (1940–2020), American football player
- Harry Crump (footballer) (1873–1918), English football player
- Helen Crump, a fictional character on the American TV program The Andy Griffith Show
- James Crump, American curator, writer, producer and director
- Jason Crump (born 1975), Australian motorcycle speedway rider
- Jerry K. Crump (1933–1977), US Army soldier during the Korean War
- John Andrew Crump, New Zealand-born infectious diseases physician and medical microbiologist
- John Crump (tennis) (born 1940), British tennis player
- John Arthur Crump (1866–1930), Methodist missionary, zoologist, anthropologist, and educator
- Josiah Crump (ca. 1838–1890), American postal worker and politician
- Kevin Crump (1949–2023), Australian murderer and rapist
- Lavell Crump (born 1974), birth name of American musician David Banner
- Louis Crump (1919–2019), American lawyer and politician
- Marty Crump (born 1946), American behavioral ecologist
- Mary Eliza Walker Crump (1857–1928), American singer
- Mildred C. Crump (1938–2024), American politician
- Phil Crump (born 1952), Australian motorcycle speedway rider
- Owen Crump (1903–1998), American screenwriter, film director, and producer
- Pleasant Crump (1847–1951), last surviving Confederate soldier of the American Civil War
- Richard Crump (born 1955), Canadian football player
- Robert Crump (1854–1922), American politician from Arkansas
- Rolly Crump (1930–2023), American designer and Disney Imagineer
- Rousseau Owen Crump (1843–1901), American businessman and politician from Michigan
- S. Scott Crump, inventor of fused deposition modeling (FDM) and co-founder of Stratasys, Inc.
- Thomas Crump (1845–1907), English cricketer
- Wayne Crump (born 1948), American politician
- William Crump (disambiguation)

== Pop culture ==
Alistair Crump, main antagonist of Haunted Mansion shares the surname.

== See also ==
- Covey-Crump (surname)
