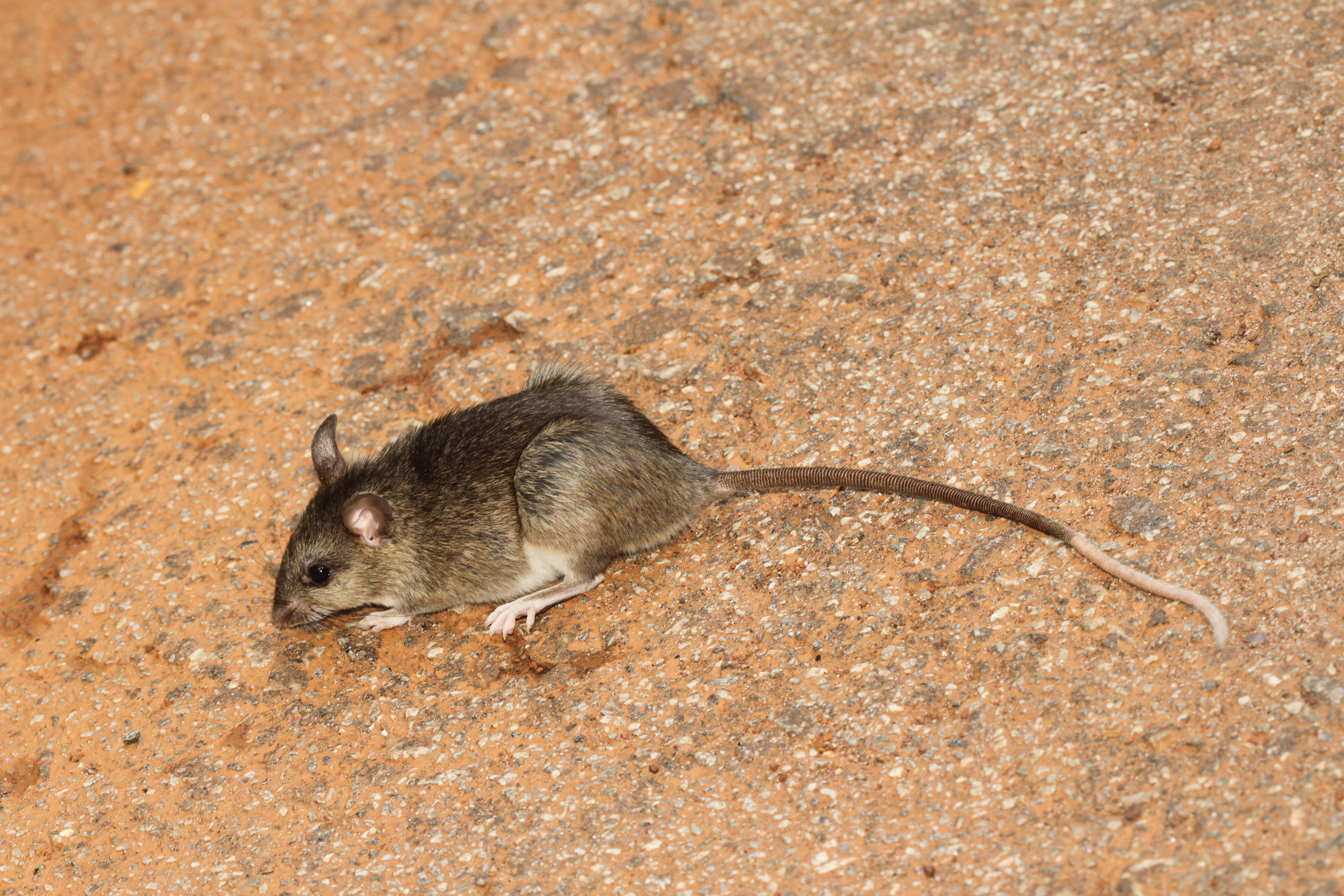
- Blanford's rat (Madromys blanfordi)

Scientific classification
- Kingdom: Animalia
- Phylum: Chordata
- Class: Mammalia
- Order: Rodentia
- Family: Muridae
- Subfamily: Murinae
- Tribe: Millardini; Lecompte et al., 2008

Genera
- Cremnomys; Diomys; Madromys; Millardia; Pithecheir; Pithecheirops

= Millardini =

Tribe of muroid rodents

Millardini is a tribe of muroid rodents in the subfamily Murinae. Species in this tribe are found in South and Southeast Asia.

== Species ==
Species in the tribe include:

- Millardia division
  - Genus Cremnomys
    - Cutch rat, Cremnomys cutchicus
    - Elvira rat, Cremnomys elvira
  - Genus Diomys – Manipur mouse
    - Crump's mouse, Diomys crumpi
  - Genus Madromys
    - Blanford's rat, Madromys blanfordi
  - Genus Millardia – Asian soft-furred rats
    - Sand-colored soft-furred rat, Millardia gleadowi
    - Miss Ryley's soft-furred rat, Millardia kathleenae
    - Kondana soft-furred rat, Millardia kondana
    - Soft-furred rat, Millardia meltada
- Pithecheir division
  - Genus Pithecheir – monkey-footed rats
    - Red tree rat, Pithecheir melanurus
    - Malayan tree rat, Pithecheir parvus
  - Genus Pithecheirops
    - Bornean pithecheirops, Pithecheirops otion
