= Crump =

Crump may refer to:

== Places ==
- Crump, Michigan, United States
- Crump, Missouri, a community in Cape Girardeau County, Missouri, United States
- Crump, Tennessee, a city in Hardin County, Tennessee, United States
- Crump Island, off the northeast coast of Antigua
- Crump Lake (Oregon), United States

== Other ==
- Crump (surname)
- Crump Cup, an invitational golf tournament for amateurs
- Crump Stadium, a sports stadium in Memphis, Tennessee, built in 1934 and largely demolished in 2006
- Crump weir, a two dimensional triangular weir invented by Edwin Samuel Crump
- Crump's mouse (Diomys crumpi), a species of rodent in the family Muridae
- Shreve, Crump & Low, a Boston, Massachusetts jewelry business
- a Yu-Gi-Oh! character
- Lord Crump, a character in Paper Mario: The Thousand-Year Door

== See also ==
- Krump, a dancing style
