= John Andrew Crump =

New Zealand-born infectious diseases physician, microbiologist, epidemiologist

John Andrew Crump FRSNZ
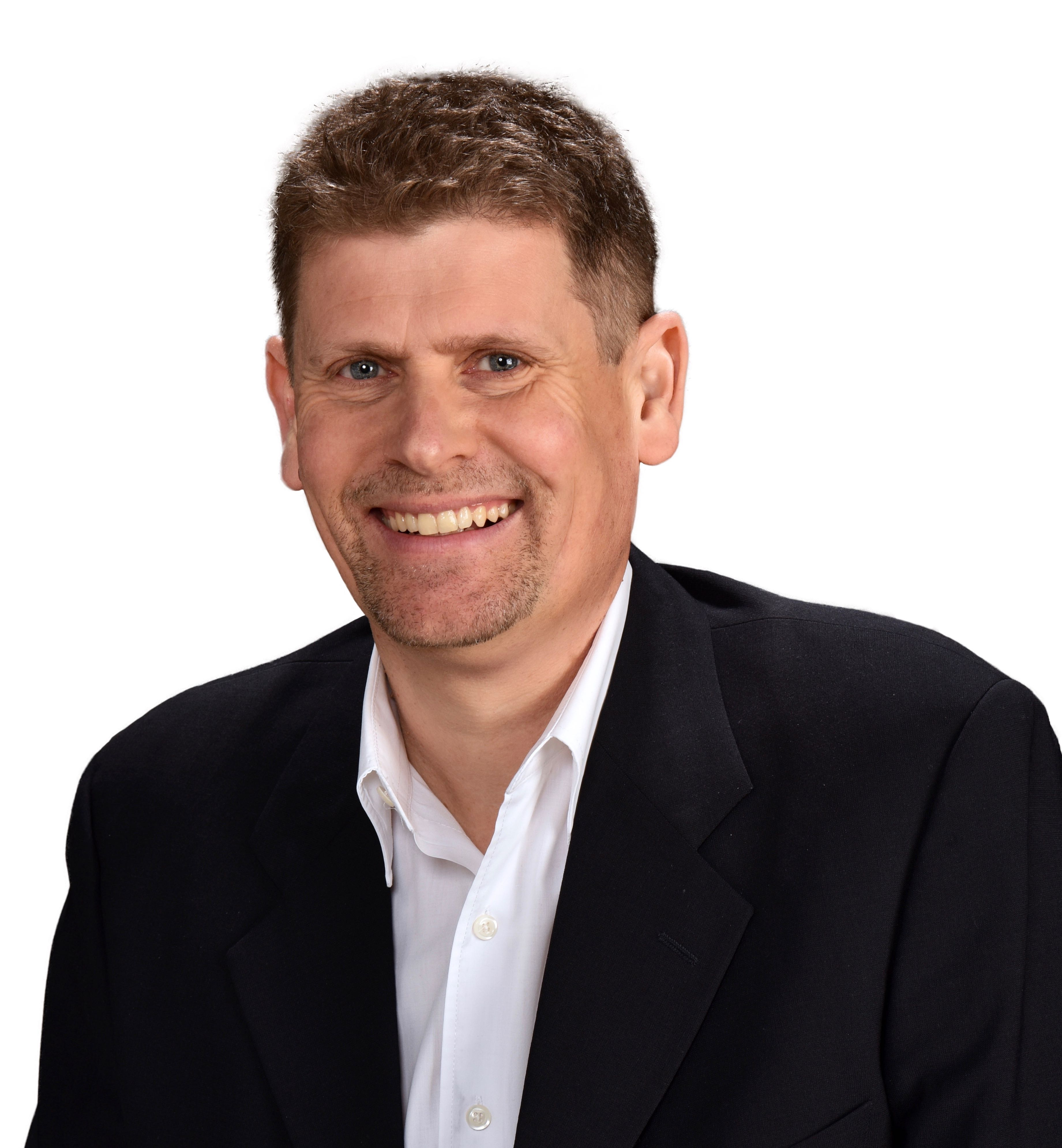
- Crump in 2019
- Education: University of Otago; London School of Hygiene and Tropical Medicine
- Known for: Tropical febrile illness, including malaria overdiagnosis and non-malarial fever and sepsis; Invasive bacterial and zoonotic diseases, including typhoid fever and other invasive salmonelloses; One Health, infectious disease surveillance, and global health research.
- Awards: James H. Steele Veterinary Public Health Award (US Centers for Disease Control and Prevention, 2005); Bailey K. Ashford Medal (American Society of Tropical Medicine and Hygiene, 2012); Chalmers Medal (Royal Society of Tropical Medicine and Hygiene, 2022)
- Relatives: John Arthur Crump (great grandfather)
- Scientific career
- Fields: Infectious diseases Medical microbiology Epidemiology; Tropical medicine Zoonoses
- Workplaces: University of Otago; US Centers for Disease Control and Prevention; Duke University
- Thesis: HIV prevention, treatment, and care in sub-Saharan Africa
- Website: https://www.otago.ac.nz/healthsciences/expertise/profile?id=1104

John Andrew Crump FRSNZ is a New Zealand infectious diseases physician, medical microbiologist, and epidemiologist. He is Professor of Medicine, Pathology, and Global Health at the University of Otago and an adjunct professor of medicine, Pathology, and Global Health at Duke University. He serves as Director of the Otago Global Health Institute, one of the university's research centres. His primary research interest is fever in the tropics, focusing on invasive bacterial diseases and bacterial and viral zoonoses.

== Early life and education ==
Crump was born in Oamaru and raised on a farm at Okaramio, attending Havelock School and Marlborough Boys' College. He graduated MB ChB in 1993 and completed his MD doctoral thesis in 2013 on clinical and laboratory aspects of HIV in Tanzania from the University of Otago Medical School. He was awarded DTM&H in 1995 by the Royal College of Physicians after studying tropical medicine at the London School of Hygiene and Tropical Medicine. Crump trained as both an internist in infectious diseases and as a pathologist in medical microbiology in New Zealand, England, Australia, and the US, being made MRCP(UK) in 1997, FRACP in 1999, FRCPA in 2004, and FRCP in 2009. He served as an Epidemic Intelligence Service Officer with the US Centers for Disease Control and Prevention (US CDC).

== Career and research ==
Crump studies the diagnosis, management, and prevention of infectious causes of fever in the tropics other than malaria, a complex clinical problem that affects many millions annually particularly in low- and middle-income countries. His interest in non-malaria fever developed during a decade serving as Director of a large Tanzania-based collaborative infectious diseases research program where he contributed substantially to the development of Kilimanjaro Christian Medical Centre as a leading African center for infectious diseases research and training. Crump has advocated for a comprehensive approach to investigating febrile illness as a necessary progression from the traditional disease-specific approach in tropical medicine. He has contributed to describing the problem of malaria over-diagnosis, and also to appreciation of range of neglected causes of fever including invasive bacterial diseases; bacterial zoonoses such as brucellosis, leptospirosis, Q fever, and rickettsioses; and viral diseases such as Rift Valley Fever. Much of his research is trans-disciplinary involving close collaboration between human health experts, veterinarians, ecologists, and social scientists, and following the so-called 'One Health' approach. Crump serves on the leadership group of the multi-centre international Febrile Illness Evaluation in a Broad Range of Endemicities (FIEBRE) study that characterizes major preventable and treatable causes of fever in low-resource settings in Africa and Asia.

Crump has led the development of reporting standards for disease prevalence and incidence studies, devised hybrid surveillance methods for febrile disease incidence estimation, and has made major contributions on natural history approaches for disease burden assessment. He has led work characterizing the burden of typhoid fever, paratyphoid fever, and nontyphoidal Salmonella invasive disease that has contributed to diagnosis, management, and prevention efforts for these diseases, including vaccine deployment and vaccine development. He has served in a range of advisory roles to the World Health Organization, including on the burden of invasive salmonelloses to the Foodborne Diseases Epidemiology Reference Group, the WHO Strategic Advisory Group of Experts on Immunization Working Group on Typhoid Vaccines, and the WHO Immunization, Vaccines and Biologicals Technical Advisory Group on Salmonella vaccines. Crump leads work generating and synthesising data to inform country decisions on typhoid prevention by vaccine introduction and non-vaccine measures in endemic areas and is a long-serving member of the Coalition Against Typhoid. He leads work preparing for large-scale efficacy trials of vaccines against nontyphoidal Salmonella invasive disease, a major cause of invasive bacterial disease and death in infants and young children in sub-Saharan African countries.

Crump has a research interest in global health ethics. He has made major contributions on responsible global health training programs, spurred by concern for the unintended consequences of expansion of short-term global health training opportunities in low-resource areas. With Dr. Jeremy Sugarman, Crump co-chaired the Wellcome Trust-funded Working Group on Ethics Guidelines for Global Health Training (WEIGHT) that developed initial guidelines for responsible global health training programs. Crump has developed normative guidance on the responsible scheduling of multiple time zone teleconferences, and has also written on the value of cosmopolitan principles and the challenges posed by health nationalism in global health responses.

== Awards and honors ==
Crump was awarded the 2005 US CDC James H. Steele Veterinary Public Health Award for outstanding contributions in the investigation, control, or prevention of zoonotic diseases or other animal-related human health problems. In 2012, Crump received the American Society of Tropical Medicine and Hygiene Bailey K. Ashford Medal for distinguished work in tropical medicine. In 2022, Crump was awarded the Royal Society of Tropical Medicine and Hygiene Chalmers Medal for research of outstanding merit in tropical medicine and mentoring of junior investigators. Crump was awarded the 2021 University of Otago Dunedin School of Medicine Dean's Medal for Research Excellence and the 2024 University of Otago Distinguished Research Medal. In 2025, Crump was elected a Fellow of the Royal Society of New Zealand 'for breakthroughs in management of non-malaria fever and sepsis in tropical regions.'

== Publications ==
As of December 2026, Crump had published >350 scientific manuscripts, cited >80,000 times. He is a 2020 cross-field Clarivate Highly Cited Researcher, defined as having multiple papers ranked in the top 1% by citations for field and year.
