= Charles Crump =

Charles Crump may refer to:

- Charles Crump (footballer) (1840–1923), English footballer, football administrator and referee
- Charles Crump (cricketer) (1837–1912), New Zealand cricketer
