= Bornean pithecheirops =

Conservation status
- Data Deficient (IUCN 3.1)

Scientific classification
- Kingdom: Animalia
- Phylum: Chordata
- Class: Mammalia
- Order: Rodentia
- Family: Muridae
- Tribe: Millardini
- Genus: Pithecheirops; Emmons, 1993
- Species: P. otion

Binomial name
- Pithecheirops otion Emmons, 1993

Species of rodent

The Bornean pithecheirops (Pithecheirops otion), or Emmons's tree rat, is a species of rodent found in Borneo. It is monotypic in the genus Pithecheirops. Pithecheirops is closely related to the genus Pithecheir, and the name is derived from Pithecheir and the Greek ops, meaning "resembling". The only known example of this species was caught in the Danum Valley Field Centre in Sabah, north Borneo, at approximately 150 m.

== Description ==
It is similar to species in the genus Pithecheir, both having long, dense, soft fur and broad feet. The species is distinguished by the appearance of the inner ear bones and auditory bulla.

== Habitat ==
It was found in "dense viny roadside secondary brush on an abandoned logging road". The dominant habitat of the area is lowland dipterocarp forest. IUCN lists the species as Data Deficient due to this being the only known example of the species. There is no information on population numbers or distribution to indicate if the species is at risk or not. Despite the location of its discovery, it may be intolerant to logging, preferring possibly primary forest.
