= Ground sill =

Ground sill may refer to:

- Bed sill, a low underwater dam
- Sill plate, a horizontal support plate in architecture.
