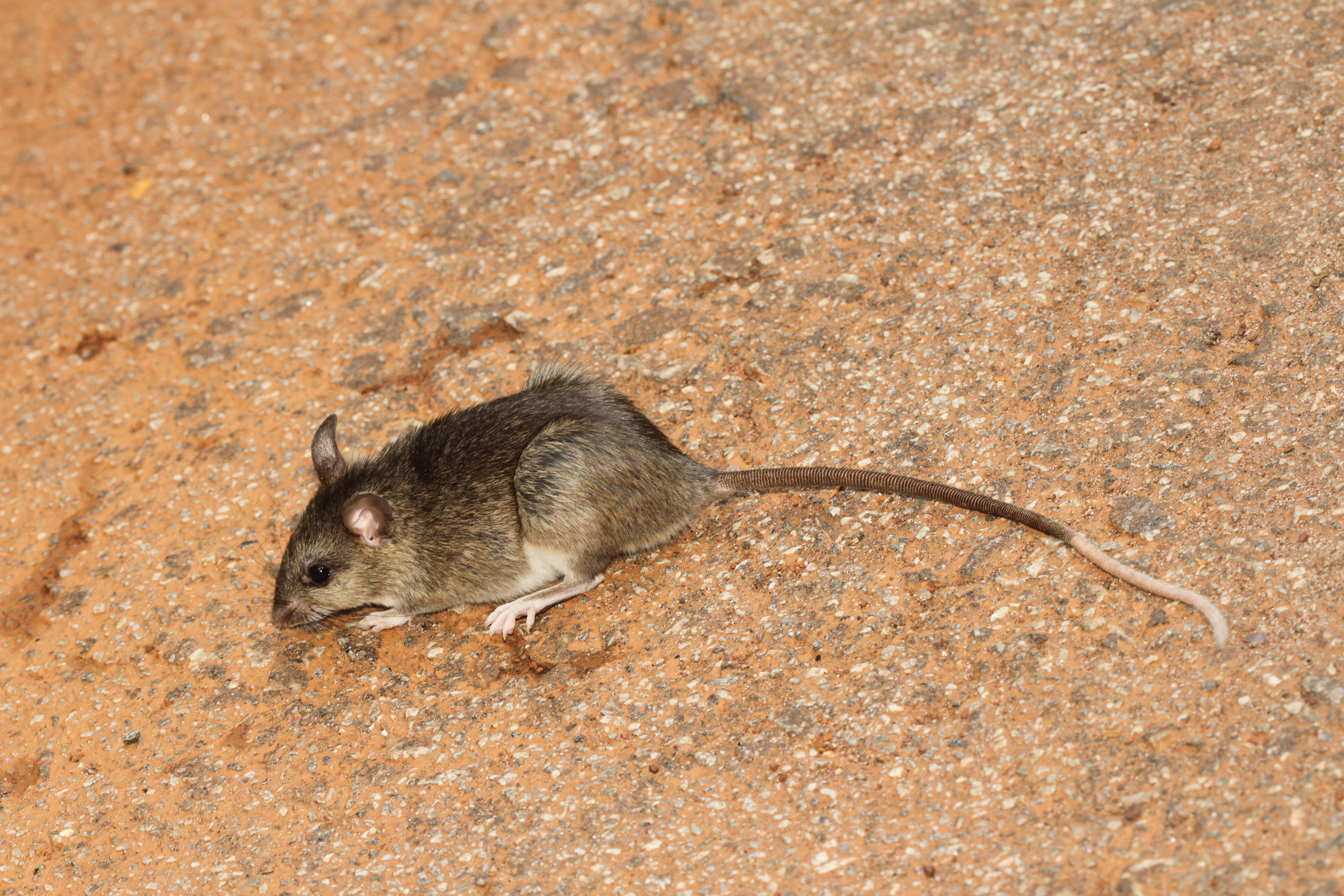

Conservation status
- Least Concern (IUCN 3.1)

Scientific classification
- Kingdom: Animalia
- Phylum: Chordata
- Class: Mammalia
- Order: Rodentia
- Family: Muridae
- Subfamily: Murinae
- Tribe: Millardini
- Genus: Madromys; Sody, 1941
- Species: M. blanfordi

Binomial name
- Madromys blanfordi (Thomas, 1881)

Synonyms
- Cremnomys blanfordi (Thomas, 1881); Mus blanfordi Thomas, 1881; Rattus blanfordi (Thomas, 1881)

= Blanford's rat =

Species of rodent

Blanford's rat (Madromys blanfordi) is a species of rodent in the family Muridae. It is the only species in the genus Madromys. It is found throughout India, Sri Lanka, and Bangladesh (in Satkhira District).

== Description ==
Head and body 14–15 cm; tail is 19 cm. Dorsum grayish brown, darker on back and lighter on the sides. White underparts. Feet are white in adults, brownish white in young. two thirds of the tail is brown from the base then covered with long dense white furs.
