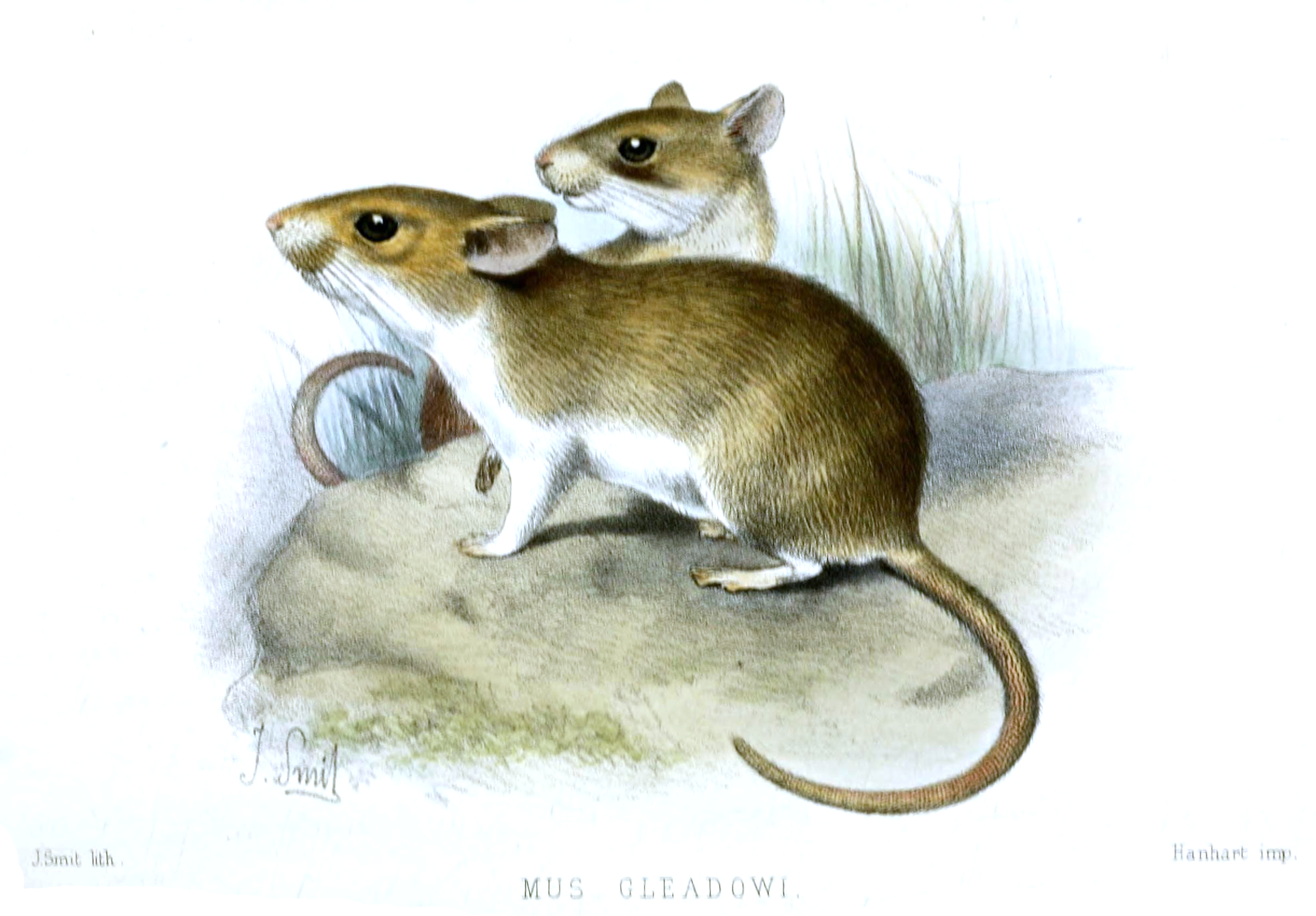
- Sand-colored soft-furred rat (Millardia gleadowi)

Scientific classification
- Domain: Eukaryota
- Kingdom: Animalia
- Phylum: Chordata
- Class: Mammalia
- Order: Rodentia
- Family: Muridae
- Tribe: Millardini
- Genus: Millardia; Thomas, 1911

Type species
- Golunda meltada

Species
- Millardia gleadowi Millardia kathleenae Millardia kondana Millardia meltada

= Millardia =

Millardia Temporal range: Early Pleistocene? - Recent

Genus of rodents

Millardia is a genus of rodent in the family Muridae native to South Asia and Myanmar. It contains the following species:

- Sand-colored soft-furred rat (Millardia gleadowi)
- Miss Ryley's soft-furred rat (Millardia kathleenae)
- Kondana soft-furred rat (Millardia kondana)
- Soft-furred rat (Millardia meltada)
