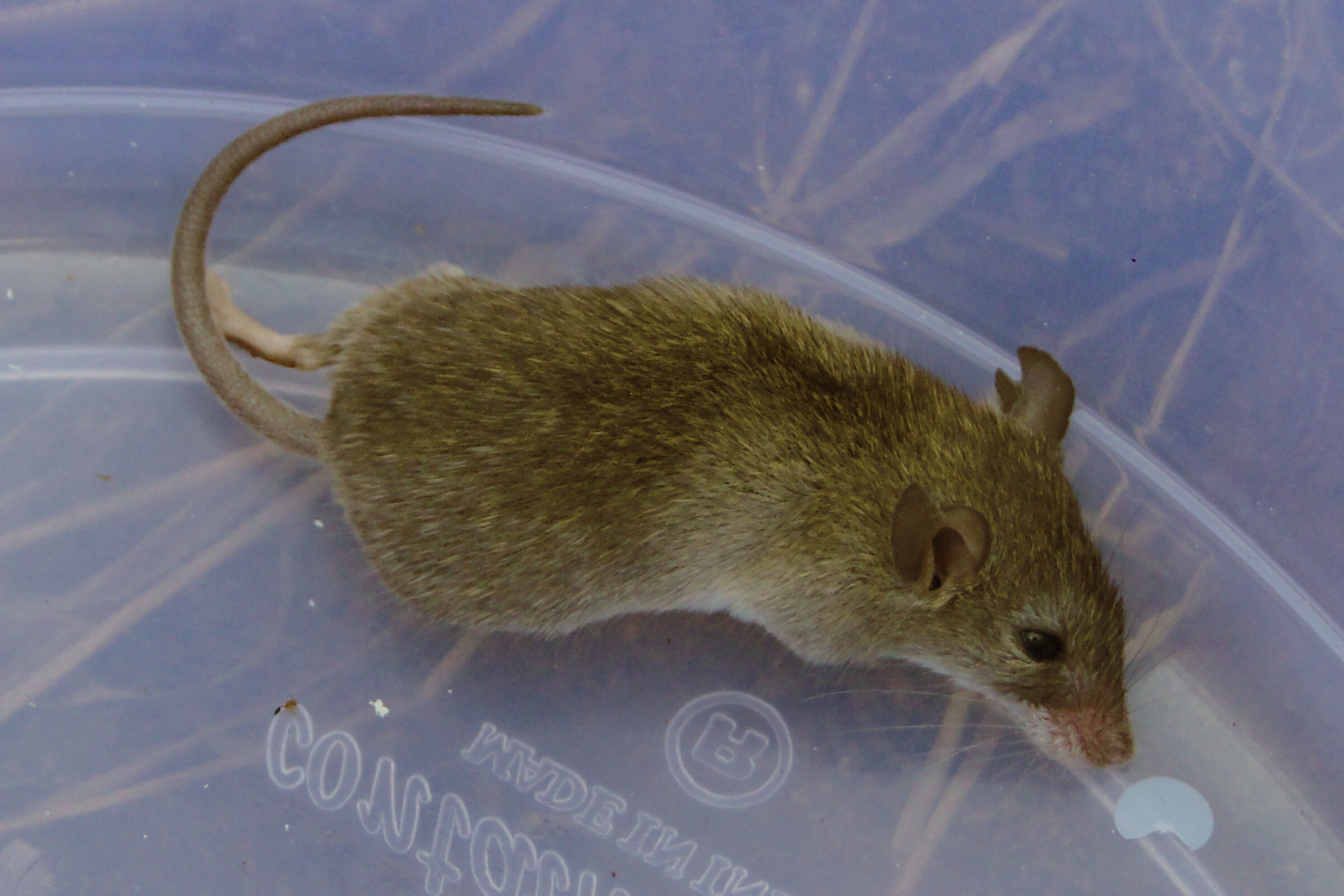
- Cremnomys cutchicus

Scientific classification
- Domain: Eukaryota
- Kingdom: Animalia
- Phylum: Chordata
- Class: Mammalia
- Order: Rodentia
- Family: Muridae
- Subfamily: Murinae
- Tribe: Millardini
- Genus: Cremnomys; Wroughton, 1912

Type species
- Cremnomys cutchicus

Species
- Cremnomys cutchicus Cremnomys elvira

= Cremnomys =

Genus of rodents

Cremnomys is a genus of rodent in the family Muridae native to India. It contains the following species:

- Cutch rat (Cremnomys cutchicus)
- Elvira rat (Cremnomys elvira)
