= Weir =

Artificial river barrier

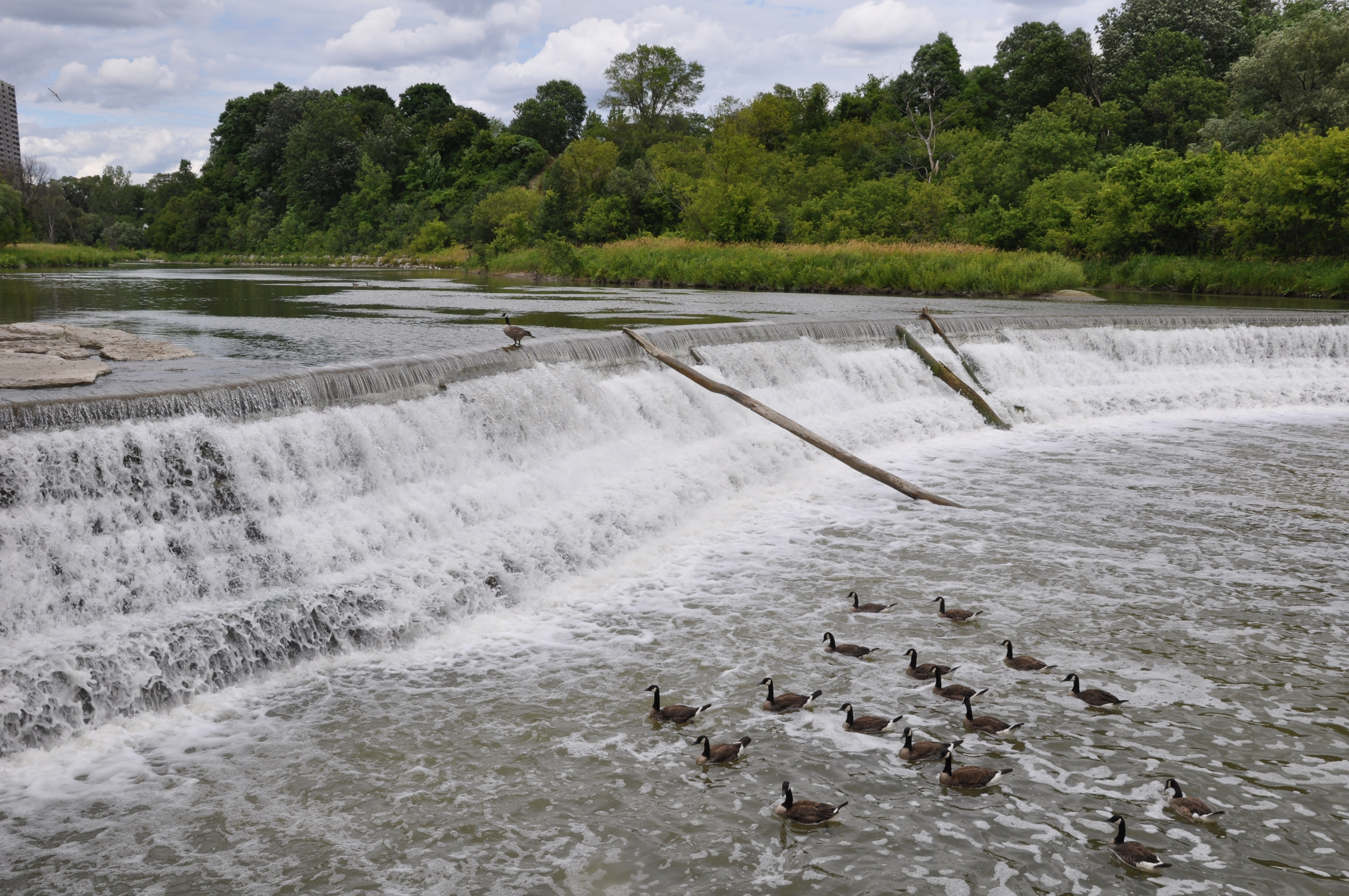
A weir on the Humber River near Cruikshank Park in Toronto, Ontario, Canada

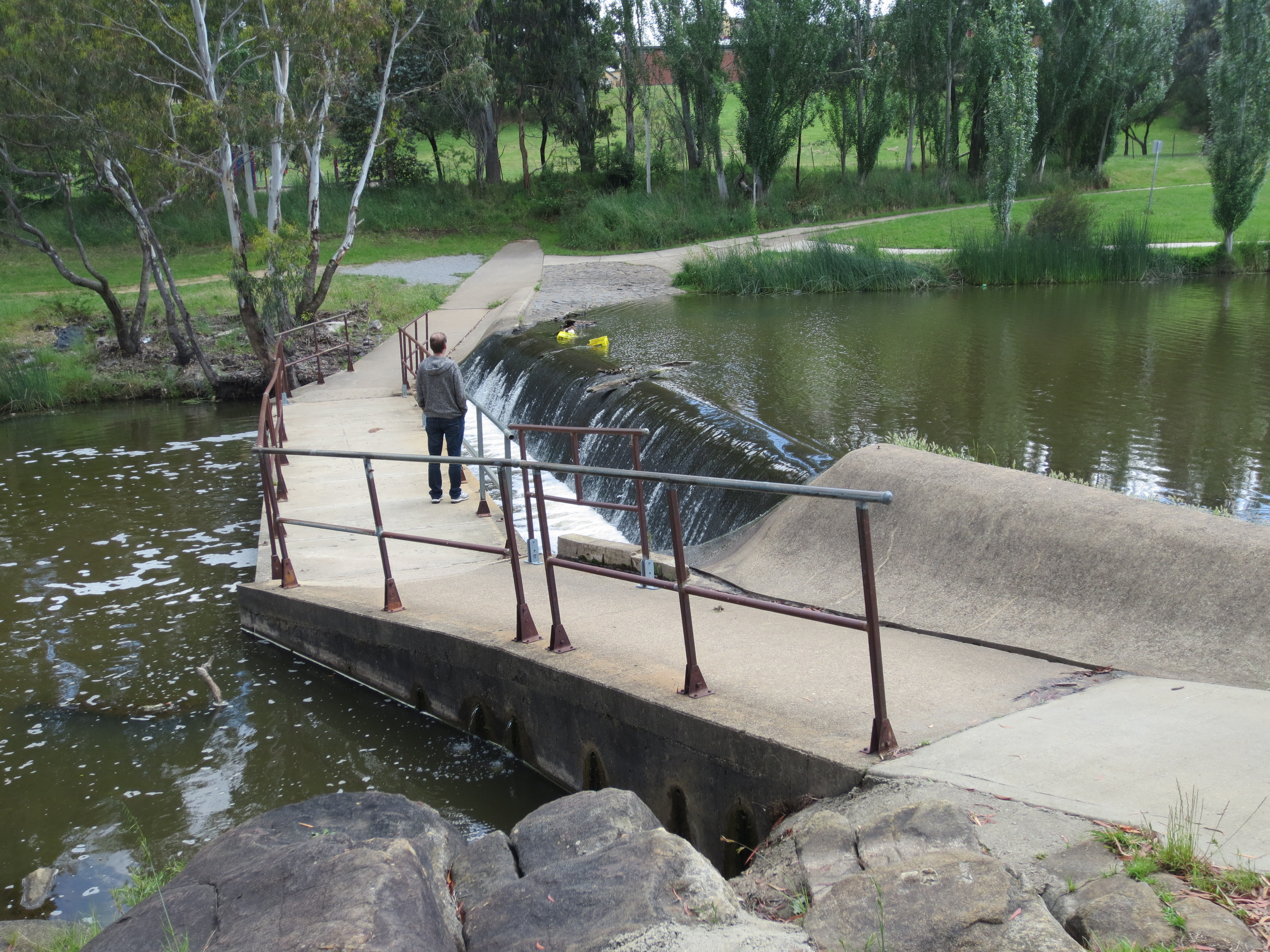
A weir on the Yass River, New South Wales, Australia, directly upstream from a shared pedestrian-bicycle river crossing

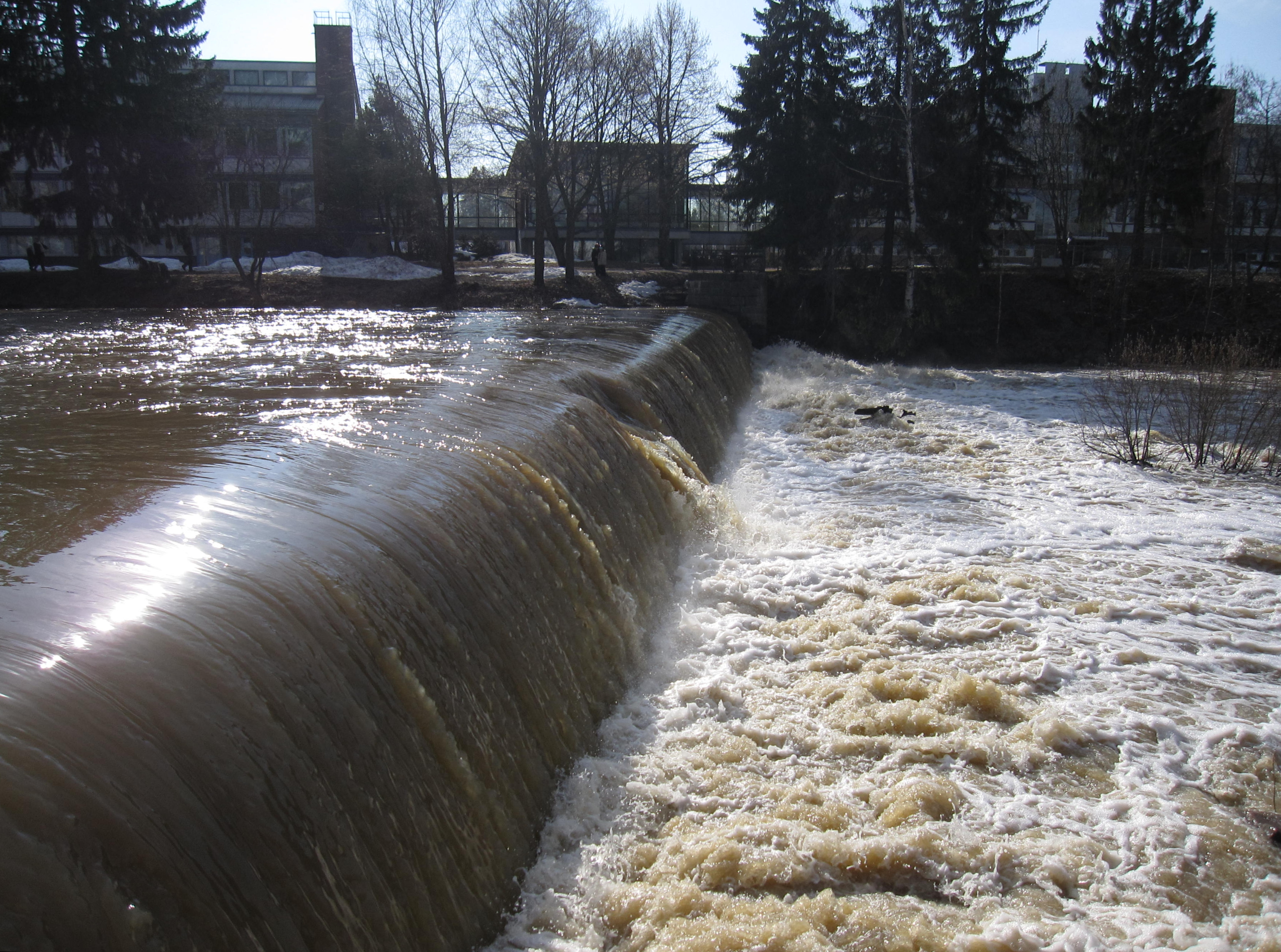
A weir on the Tikkurilankoski rapids in Vantaa, Finland

Time-lapse video of a new tilting weir being installed in the Caldicot and Wentloog Levels

A weir /wɪər/, or low-head dam, is a barrier across the width of a body of water that alters the flow characteristics of water and usually results in a change in the height of the water level. Weirs are used to control the flow of water in rivers, outlets of lakes, ponds, and reservoirs, industrial discharge, and drainage control structures. There are many weir designs, but commonly water flows freely over the top of the weir crest before cascading down to a lower level. There is no single definition as to what constitutes a weir. Weirs pose a serious danger to boaters and have been involved in several fatal drownings. A low weir is called a bed sill.

Weir can also refer to the skimmer found in most in-ground swimming pools, which controls the flow of water pulled into the filtering system.

== Etymology ==
The word likely originated from Middle English were, Old English wer, a derivative of the root of the verb werian, meaning "to defend, dam". The German cognate is Wehr, which means the same as the English weir.

== Function ==
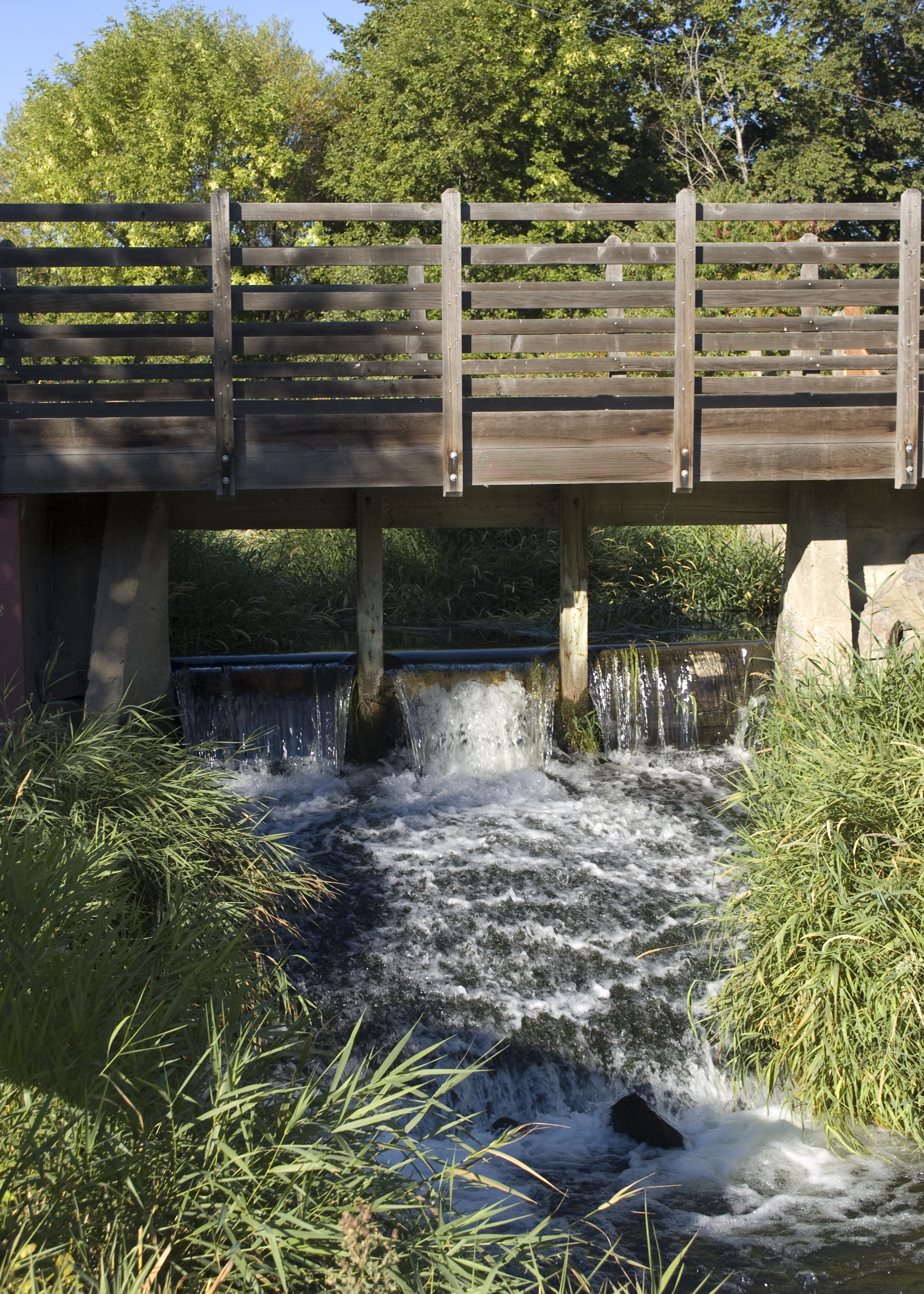
The broad crested weir at the Thorp grist mill in Thorp, Washington, US

Commonly, weirs are used to prevent flooding, measure water discharge, and help render rivers more navigable by boat. In some locations, the terms dam and weir are synonymous.

A common distinction between dams and weirs is that water may flow through both (controlling flow and often turning turbines in the case of a dam), but it only flows over a weir. Thus many dams have an accompanying spillway, lower than the crest of the dam, to release water in excess of its capacity to retain or regulate its flow.

Weirs can vary in size both horizontally and vertically, with the smallest being only a few centimetres in height whilst the largest may be many metres tall and hundreds of metres long. Some common weir purposes are outlined below.

=== Flow measurement ===
When appropriate conditions are met, weirs allow hydrologists and engineers a simple method of measuring the volumetric flow rate in small to medium-sized streams/rivers or in industrial discharge locations. Since the geometry of the top of the weir is known and all water flows over the weir, the depth of water behind the weir can be converted to a rate of flow. However, this can only be achieved in locations where all water flows over the top of the weir crest, and none escapes elsewise.

A generic discharge calculation can be summarised as

Q = CLH^{n}

where

Q is the volumetric flow rate of fluid (the discharge),
C is the flow coefficient for the structure (on average a figure of 3.33),
L is the width of the crest,
H is the height of head of water over the crest,
n varies with structure (e.g., 3/2 for horizontal weir, 5/2 for V-notch weir).

=== Flow over a V-notch weir ===
The flow over a V-notch weir (in ft^{3}/s) is given by the Kindsvater–Shen equation:

$$Q =\frac{8}{15} \sqrt{2g}\, C_e \tan\frac{\theta}{2} (h + k)^\frac{5}{2},$$

where

Q is the volumetric flow rate of fluid in ft^{3}/s,
g is the acceleration due to gravity in ft/s^{2},
C_{e} is the flow correction factor given in Shen 1981, p. B29, Fig. 12,
θ is the angle of the V-notch weir,
h is the height of the fluid above the bottom of the V-notch,
k is the head correction factor given in Shen 1981, p. B20, Fig 4.

=== Control of invasive species ===
As weirs are a physical barrier, they can impede the longitudinal movement of fish and other animals up and down a river. This can have a negative effect on fish species that migrate as part of their breeding cycle (e.g., salmonids), but it also can be useful as a method of preventing invasive species moving upstream. For example, weirs in the Great Lakes region have helped to prevent invasive sea lamprey from colonising farther upstream.

=== Watermills ===
Mill ponds are created by a weir that impounds water that then flows over the structure. The energy created by the change in height of the water can then be used to power waterwheels and power sawmills, grinding wheels, and other equipment.

=== Flood control and altering river conditions ===
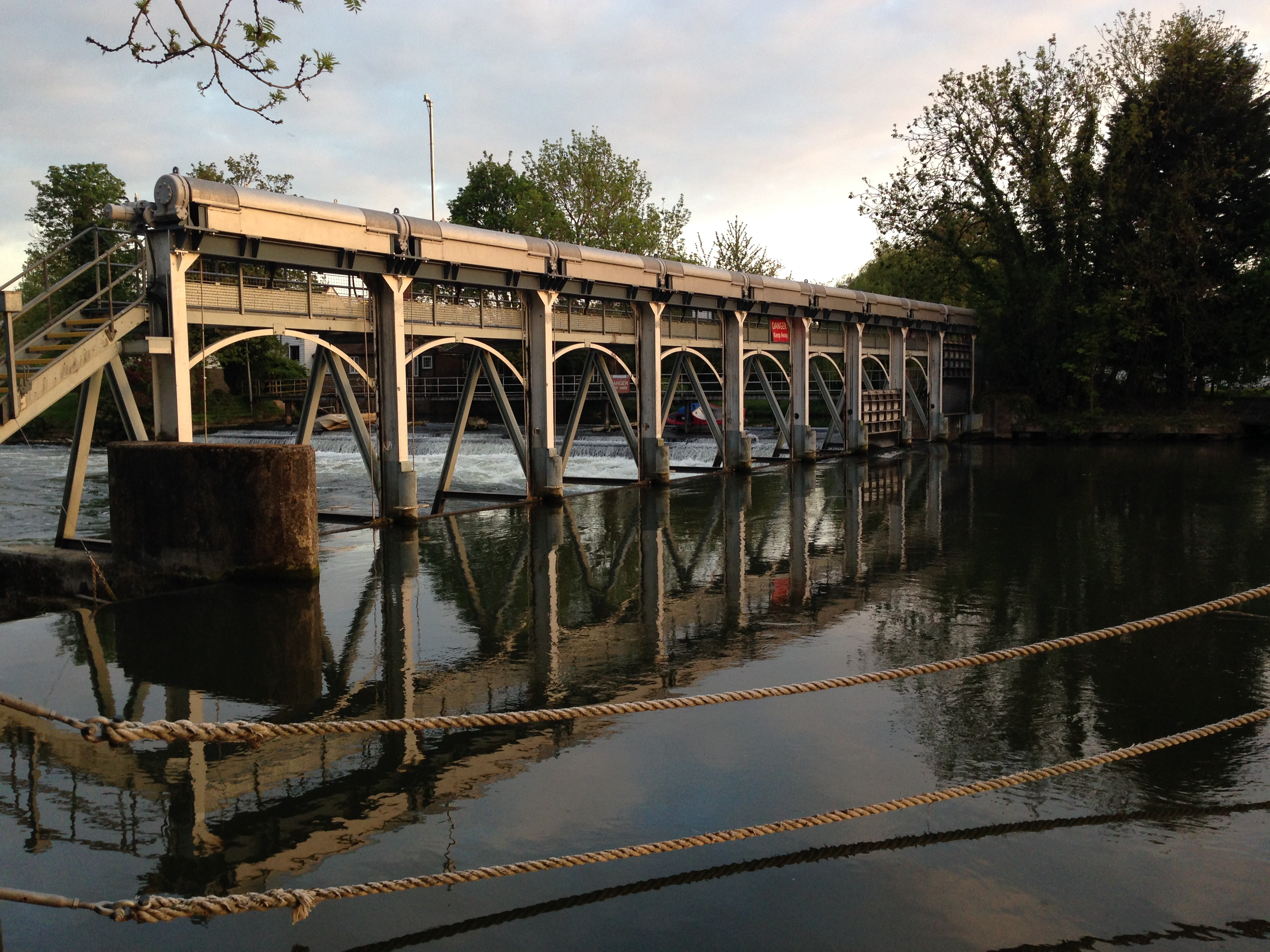
A sluice gate weir at Bray Lock on the River Thames, facing downstream. In the background is the smaller secondary overspill weir. Visible in the foreground are catch ropes to prevent small boats from going over the weir.

Weirs are commonly used to control the flow rates of rivers during periods of high discharge. Sluice gates (or in some cases the height of the weir crest) can be altered to increase or decrease the volume of water flowing downstream. Weirs for this purpose are commonly found upstream of towns and villages and can either be automated or manually operated. By slowing the rate at which water moves downstream even slightly, a disproportionate effect can be had on the likelihood of flooding. On larger rivers, a weir can also alter the flow characteristics of the waterway to the point that vessels are able to navigate areas previously inaccessible due to extreme currents or eddies. Many larger weirs will have construction features that allow boats and river users to "shoot the weir" and navigate by passing up or down stream without having to exit the river. Weirs constructed for this purpose are especially common on the River Thames, and most are situated near each of the river's 45 locks.

== Issues ==
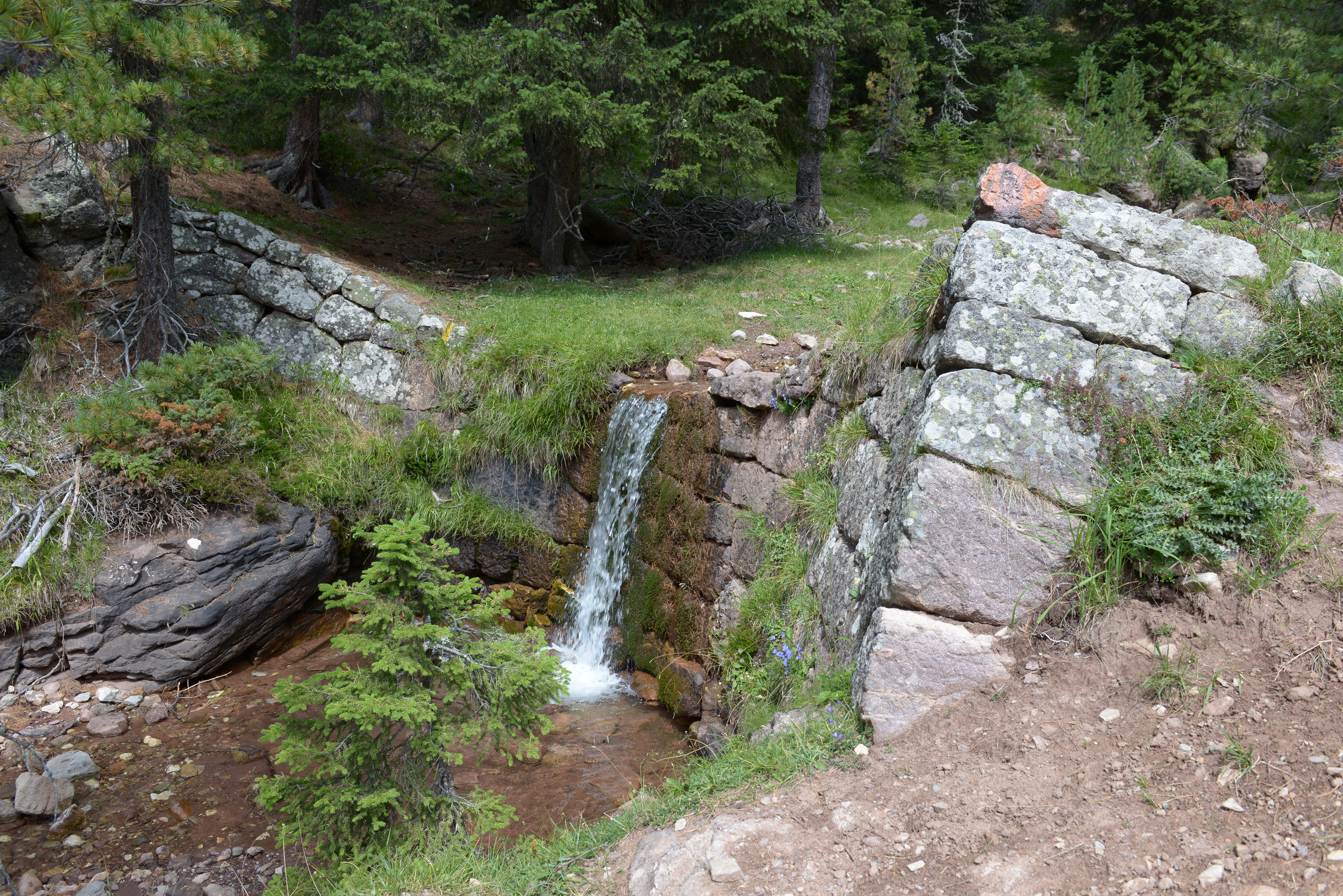
During periods of high river flow, this nineteenth century weir of porphyry stone on a creek in the Alps would have significantly more water flowing over it.

=== Ecology ===
Because a weir impounds water behind it and alters the flow regime of the river, it can have an effect on the local ecology. Typically, the reduced river velocity upstream can lead to increased siltation (deposition of fine particles of silt and clay on the river bottom) that reduces the water oxygen content and smothers invertebrate habitat and fish spawning sites. The oxygen content typically returns to normal once water has passed over the weir crest (although it can be hyper-oxygenated), although increased river velocity can scour the river bed causing erosion and habitat loss.

=== Fish migration ===
Weirs can have a significant effect on fish migration. Any weir that either exceeds the maximum height a species can jump or creates flow conditions that cannot be bypassed (e.g., due to excessive water velocity) effectively limits the maximum point upstream that fish can migrate. In some cases this can mean that huge lengths of breeding habitat are lost, and over time this can have a significant impact on fish populations.

In many countries, it is now a legal requirement to build fish ladders into the design of a weir that ensure that fish can bypass the barriers and access upstream habitats. Unlike dams, weirs do not usually prevent downstream fish migration (as water flows over the top and allows fish to bypass the structure in that water), although they can create flow conditions that injure juvenile fish. Recent studies suggest that navigation locks have also potential to provide increased access for a range of biota, including poor swimmers.

=== Safety ===
Even though the water around weirs can often appear relatively calm, they can be extremely dangerous places to boat, swim, or wade, as the circulation patterns on the downstream side—typically called a hydraulic jump—can submerge a person indefinitely. Canoers and kayakers often colloquially refer to weirs as "drowning machines", especially in warning signage. The Ohio DNR recommends that a victim should "tuck the chin down, draw the knees up to the chest with arms wrapped around them. Hopefully, conditions will be such that the current will push the victim along the bed of the river until swept beyond the boil line and released by the hydraulic." The Pennsylvania State Police also recommends to victims, "curl up, dive to the bottom, and swim or crawl downstream". As the hydraulic jump entrains air, the buoyancy of the water between the dam and boil line will be reduced by upward of 30%, and if a victim is unable to float, escape at the base of the dam may be the only option for survival.

== Common types ==
There are many different types of weirs and they can vary from a simple stone structure that is barely noticeable, to elaborate and very large structures that require extensive management and maintenance.

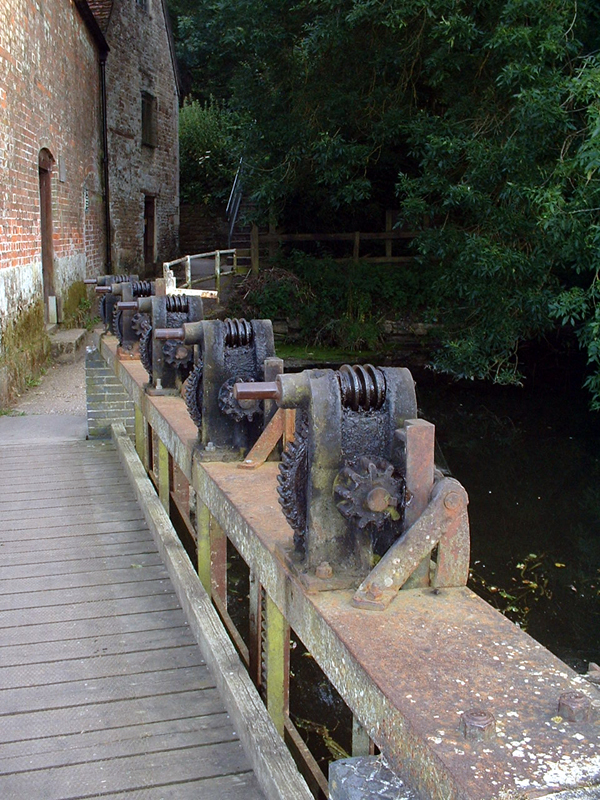
The bridge and weir mechanism at Sturminster Newton on the River Stour, Dorset, UK

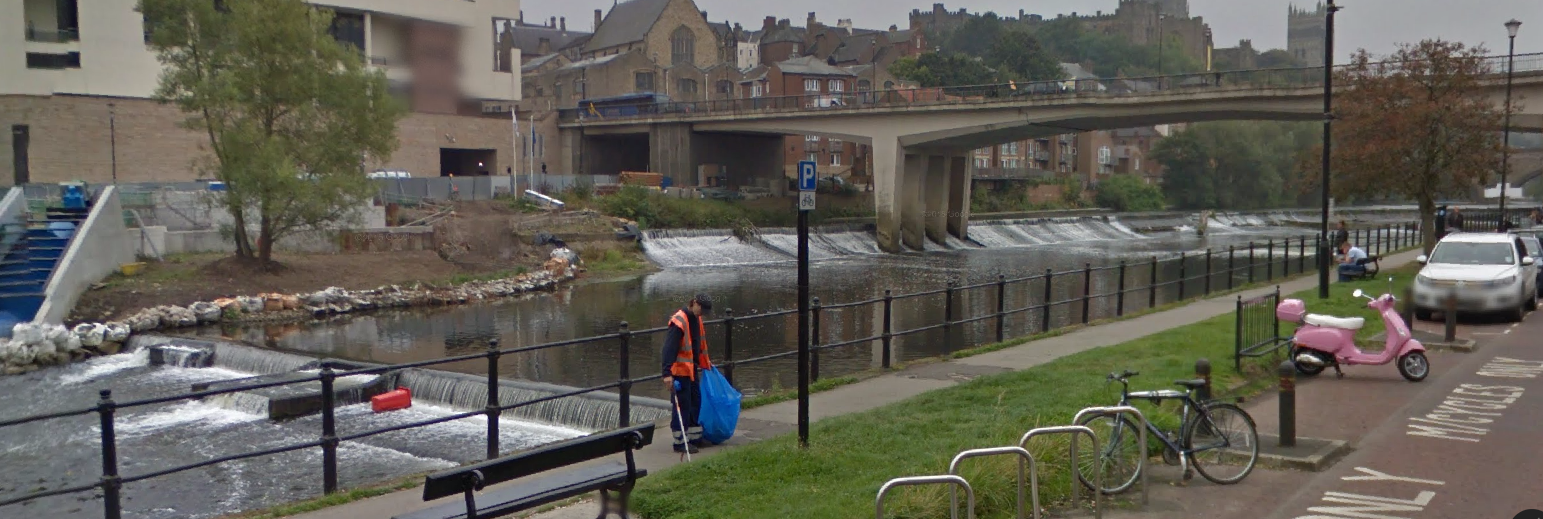
Two weirs on the River Wear in Durham, UK: the lower weir is a compound weir that also has fish ladders to allow fish such as salmon to navigate the weir

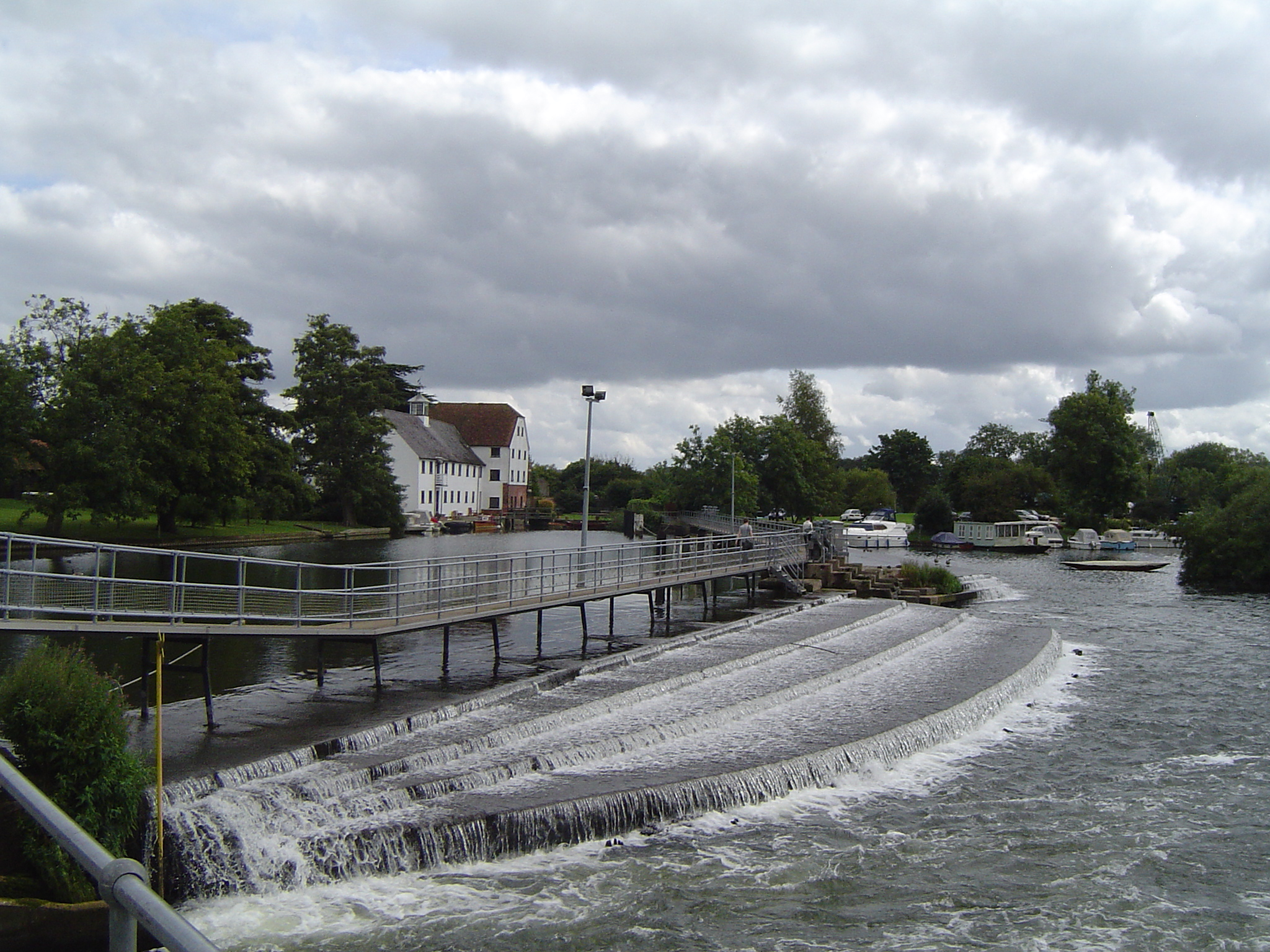
The weir at Hambleden Lock on the River Thames at Hambleden, Buckinghamshire. A broad-crest weir, the public has right of way to cross the river using its walkway.

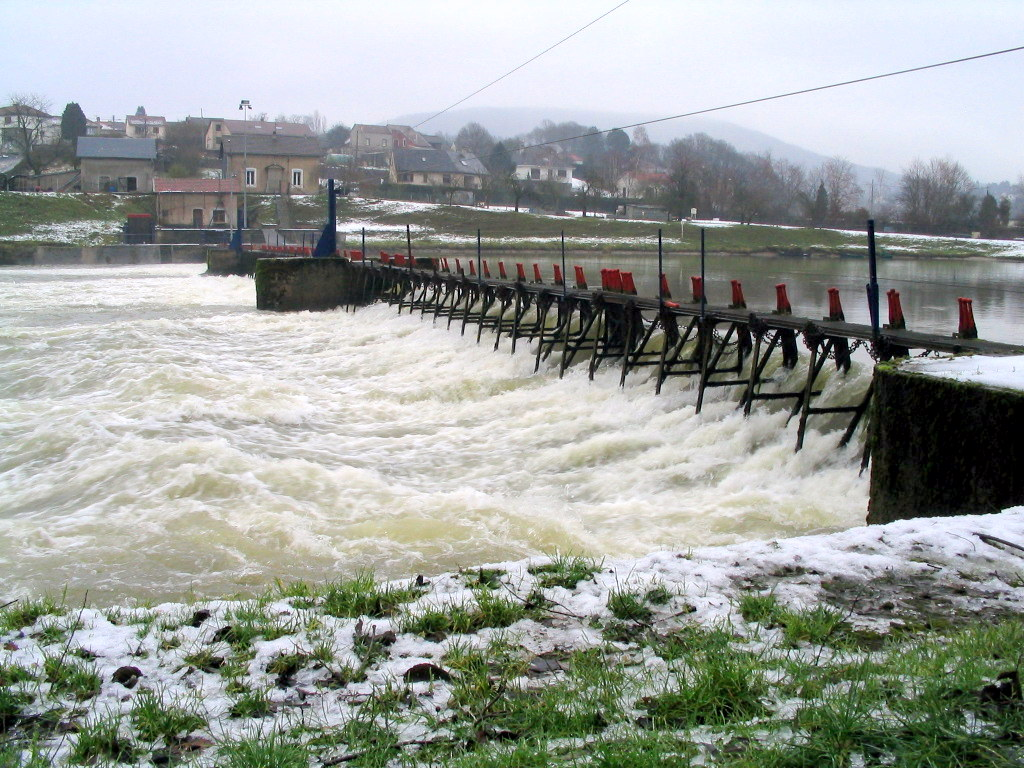
A manually operated needle dam-type weir near Revin on the River Meuse, France

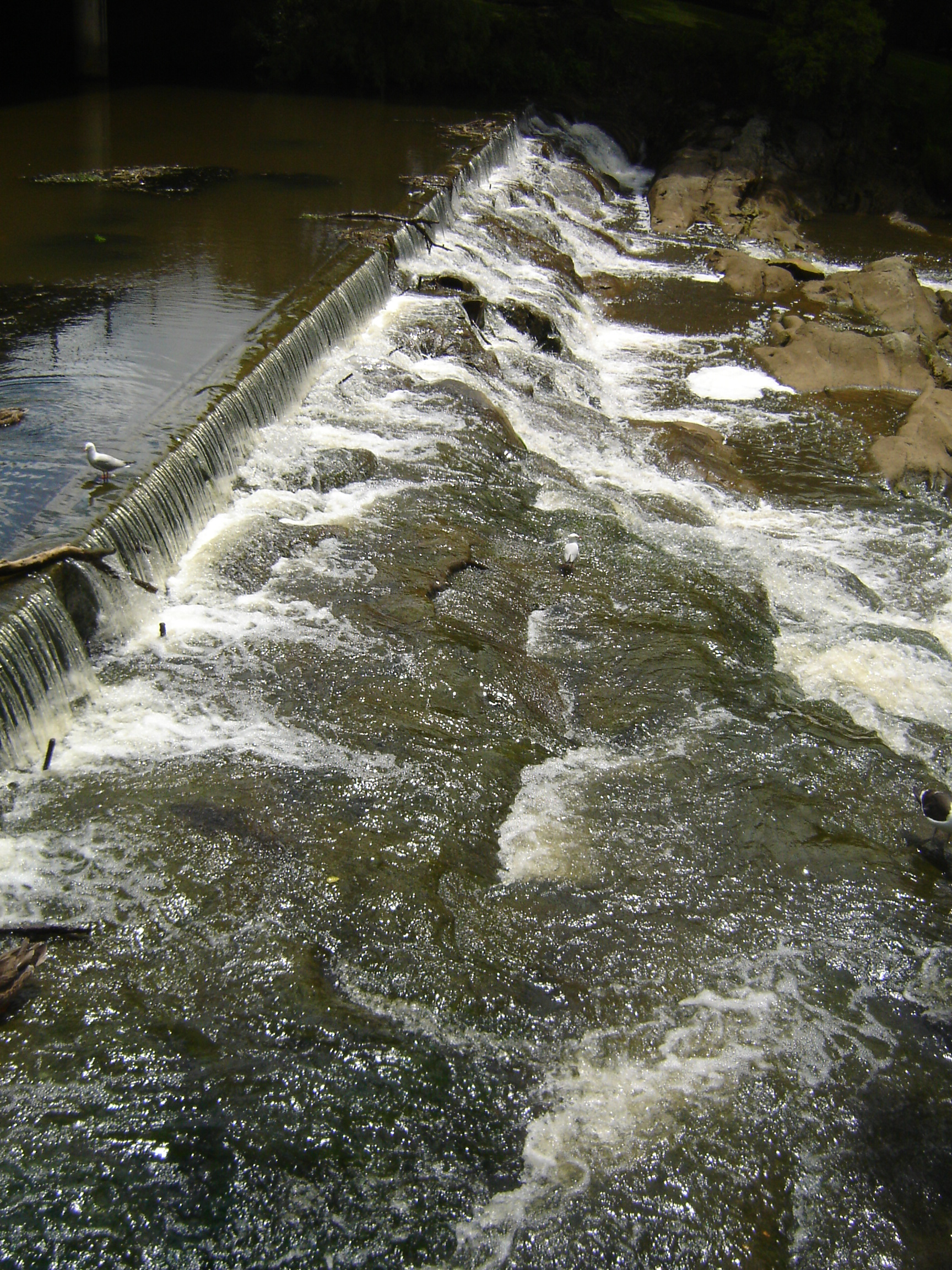
A broad-crest weir in Warkworth, New Zealand

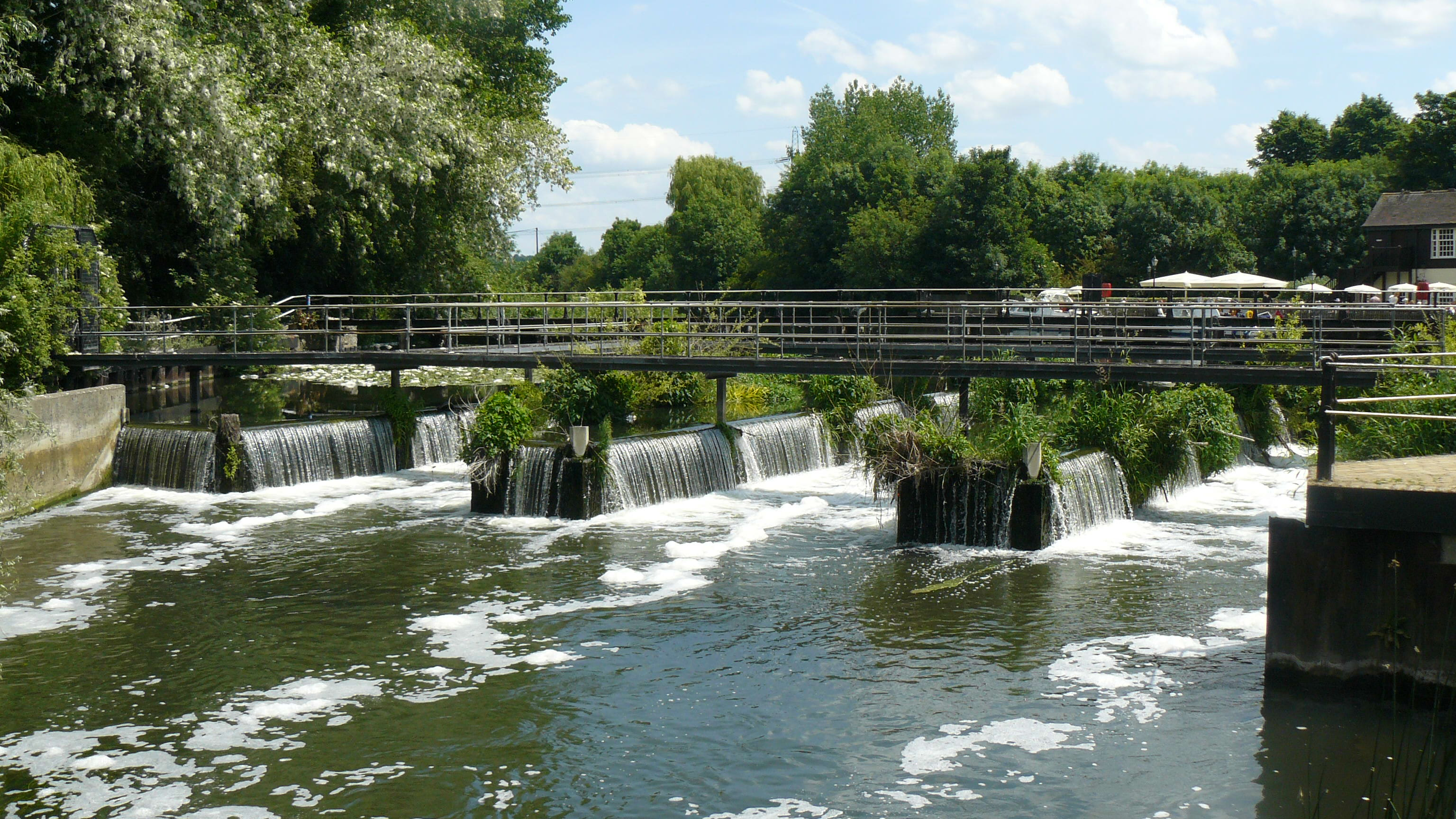
A complicated series of broad-crest and V-notch weirs at Dobbs Weir in Hertfordshire, UK

=== Broad-crested ===
A broad-crested weir is a flat-crested structure, where the water passes over a crest that covers much or all of the channel width. This is one of the most common types of weir found worldwide.

=== Compound ===
A compound weir is any weir that comprises several different designs into one structure. They are commonly seen in locations where a river has multiple users who may need to bypass the structure. A common design would be one where a weir is broad-crested for much of its length, but has a section where the weir stops or is 'open' so that small boats and fish can traverse the structure.

=== V-notch ===
A notch weir is any weir where the physical barrier is significantly higher than the water level except for a specific notch (often V-shaped) cut into the panel. At times of normal flow all the water must pass through the notch, simplifying flow volume calculations, and at times of flood the water level can rise and submerge the weir without any alterations made to the structure.

=== Polynomial ===
A polynomial weir is a weir that has a geometry defined by a polynomial equation of any order n. In practice, most weirs are low-order polynomial weirs. The standard rectangular weir is, for example, a polynomial weir of order zero. The triangular (V-notch) and trapezoidal weirs are of order one. High-order polynomial weirs are providing wider range of Head-Discharge relationships, and hence better control of the flow at outlets of lakes, ponds, and reservoirs.

== See also ==
- Crump weir
- Drop structure
- Fishing weir
- Fixed-crest dam
- Flume
- International Control Dam
- Run-of-the-river hydroelectricity
