= Marty Crump =

British ecologist

Martha L. "Marty" Crump
- Born: Madison, Wisconsin
- Education: University of Kansas
- Scientific career
- Fields: Behavioral ecology
- Workplaces: Utah State University

Martha L. "Marty" Crump is a behavioral ecologist in the Department of Biology and the Ecology Center at Utah State University who studies amphibians and reptiles. Crump was the first individual to perform a long-term ecological study on a community of tropical amphibians, and did pioneering work in the classification of variability in amphibian egg size as a function of habitat predictability. She has co-authoried one of the most popular modern herpetology textbooks, Herpetology (1997–2015) as well as the memoir In Search of the Golden Frog (2000) and a number of other books for both adults and children.

== Childhood ==
Martha L. "Marty" Crump was born in Madison, Wisconsin, and her interest in ecology and the environment were spurred by her childhood spent in the Adirondack Mountains of upstate New York.

== Education and Research ==
While an undergraduate at the University of Kansas, she worked in the herpetology division of the Museum of Natural History, and after graduation, she participated in a faunal survey of amphibians and reptiles in a remote area of the upper Amazon Basin, Ecuador. She received her master's degree at the University of Kansas for her research in Brazil concerning amphibians and reptiles, and did her doctorate research in Ecuador on frogs’ reproductive behavior. After receiving her Ph.D. from the University of Kansas, she became a professor of zoology at the University of Florida, where she continued her research in Ecuador, and also performed research in Costa Rica and Argentina, focusing on amphibian parental care, cannibalism, and reproduction.

Crump was the first individual to perform a long-term ecological study on a community of tropical amphibians. She studied reproductive strategies in the neotropical anuran community at Santa Cecilia, Ecuador and recognized ten different modes of reproduction. These categories were later modified and adapted for all anuran reproductive patterns that scientists are currently aware of.

Crump was also a pioneer in classifying variability in amphibian egg size as a function of habitat predictability. Her research, focusing on tropical tree frogs, shows that in species that breed in temporary ponds, individual females produce clutches that have a greater range of egg sizes while those breeding in permanent ponds have a very concentrated distribution, rarely deviating from the mean.

She has also been involved in several conservation activities, including acting as a board member of the International Union for the Conservation of Nature as part of the DAPTF (Declining Amphibian Populations Task Force) from 2000 to 2010. She has held several editorial positions including Associate Editor of Herpetological Natural History from 2000 to 2006 and has served as an officer in several professional organizations including the American Society of Ichthyologists and Herpetologists, Society for the Study of Amphibians and Reptiles, and The Herpetologists’ League. She is currently the Program Officer for the annual scientific conference Joint Meeting of Ichthyologists and Herpetologists (JMIH).

Crump co-authored all four editions of one of the two most popular modern herpetology textbooks, Herpetology (1997–2015). Her other books include a memoir, In Search of the Golden Frog (2000). In addition to books for adults, she has written several books for children, including Amphibians and Reptiles: An Introduction to Their Natural History and Conservation (2011) and The Mystery of Darwin's Frog (2013).

In 1997, she received the Distinguished Herpetologist Award from The Herpetologists’ League. She has also received the American Society of Ichthyologists and Herpetologists Henry S. Fitch Award for Excellence in Herpetology (2020) and the Society for the Study of Amphibians and Reptiles (SSAR) Presidential Award for Lifetime Achievement in Herpetology (2023).

== List of works ==
- A Year with Nature: An Almanac by Marty Crump (Chicago, IL: University of Chicago Press, 2018, ISBN 978-0-226-44970-8)
- In Search of the Golden Frog by Marty Crump (Chicago, IL: University of Chicago Press, 2000, ISBN 978-0-226-12198-7)
- Headless Males Make Great Lovers: And Other Unusual Natural Histories by Marty Crump (Chicago, IL: University of Chicago Press, 2006, ISBN 978-0-226-12199-4)
- Sexy Orchids Make Lousy Lovers: & Other Unusual Relationships by Marty Crump (Chicago, IL: University of Chicago Press, 2009, ISBN 978-0-226-12185-7)
- Mysteries of the Komodo Dragon: The Biggest, Deadliest Lizard Gives Up Its Secrets by Marty Crump (Honesdale, PA: Boyds Mills Press, 2010, ISBN 978-1-59078-757-1)
- Amphibians and Reptiles: An Introduction to Their Natural History and Conservation by Marty Crump (Granville, OH: McDonald & Woodward Publishing, 2011, ISBN 978-1935778202)
- Eye of Newt and Toe of Frog, Adder's Fork and Lizard's Leg: The Lore and Mythology of Amphibians and Reptiles by Marty Crump (Chicago, IL: University of Chicago Press, 2011, ISBN 978-0226116006)
- The Mystery of Darwin's Frog by Marty Crump (Boyds Mills, 2013, ISBN 978-1-59078-864-6)
- Frog Day: A Story of 24 Hours and 24 Amphibian Lives by Marty Crump, illustrated by Tony Angell (Chicago University Press, 2024, ISBN 9780226830216)
- Snake Day: A Story of 24 Hours and 24 Serpentine Lives by Marty Crump, illustrated by Stuart Patience (Chicago University Press, 2026, ISBN 9780226842950)
- Herpetology (2nd Edition) by F. Harvey Pough, Robin M. Andrews, John E. Cadle, Martha L. Crump, Alan H. Savitzky, and Kentwood D. Wells (Prentice Hall, 2000, ISBN 978-0130307958)
- Herpetology (1st Edition) by F. Harvey Pough, Robin M. Andrews, John E. Cadle, Martha L. Crump, Alan H. Savitzky, and Kentwood D. Wells (Pearson, 1997, ISBN 978-0138508760)
- Herpetology (2nd Edition) by F. Harvey Pough, Robin M. Andrews, John E. Cadle, Martha L. Crump, Alan H. Savitzky, and Kentwood D. Wells (Prentice Hall, 2000, ISBN 978-0130307958)
- Herpetology (3rd Edition) by F. Harvey Pough, Robin M. Andrews, John E. Cadle, Martha L. Crump, Alan H. Savitzky, and Kentwood D. Wells (Benjamin Cummings, 2003, ISBN 978-0131008496)
- Herpetology (4th Edition) by F. Harvey Pough, Robin M. Andrews, Martha L. Crump, Alan H. Savitzky, Kentwood D. Wells, Matthew C. Brandley (Sinauer, 2015, ISBN 978-1605352336)
- Reptiles and Amphibians of the Americas (2nd Edition) by Marty Crump and Andy Charrier, illustrated by Loreto Salinas (Post Wave Publishing, 2025, ISBN 9798895090329)
