= Elvira rat =

Conservation status
- Critically Endangered (IUCN 3.1)

Scientific classification
- Kingdom: Animalia
- Phylum: Chordata
- Class: Mammalia
- Order: Rodentia
- Family: Muridae
- Genus: Cremnomys
- Species: C. elvira

Binomial name
- Cremnomys elvira (Ellerman, 1946)

Synonyms
- Rattus elvira Ellerman, 1947

Species of rodent

The Elvira rat (Cremnomys elvira) is a critically endangered species of rodent in the family Muridae. The species was first described by Sir John Ellerman in 1946. It is found only in the Eastern Ghats of Tamil Nadu, India.

== Description ==
The Elvira rat reaches a head-and-body length of 149 mm, in addition to a tail of up to 196 mm. Its upper parts are brownish grey and the underparts are greyish white. The tail is bicoloured.

== Distribution and habitat ==
This species is known only from its type locality in the Salem District of the Eastern Ghats, Tamil Nadu, where it appears to occur in rocky habitats and dry deciduous scrub forest at elevations of about 600 m above mean sea level.

== Conservation ==
Although exact population sizes are unknown, it is thought that the species is under high pressure from habitat destruction through expansion of human settlements, logging, grazing, and dumping of mining debris. Previously considered vulnerable, in 2008 it was upgraded to a conservation status of Critically Endangered by the IUCN.
