= Pithecheir =

Scientific classification
- Kingdom: Animalia
- Phylum: Chordata
- Class: Mammalia
- Order: Rodentia
- Family: Muridae
- Tribe: Millardini
- Genus: Pithecheir; Lesson, 1840

Type species
- Pithecheir melanurus Lesson, 1840

Species
- Pithecheir melanurus; Pithecheir parvus

Genus of rodents

Pithecheir is a genus of rodent in the family Muridae endemic to Southeast Asia. It contains the following species:

- Red tree rat (Pithecheir melanurus)
- Malayan tree rat (Pithecheir parvus)
