= Jeremy Sugarman =

American philosopher

Academic background
- Education: BS, psychology, 1982, Duke University; MD, 1986, Duke University School of Medicine; M.P.H., Johns Hopkins Bloomberg School of Public Health; M.A., Applied Ethics, Georgetown University

Jeremy Sugarman is an American bioethicist and physician. He is the Harvey M. Meyerhoff Professor of Bioethics and Medicine at the Johns Hopkins Berman Institute of Bioethics. He is a fellow of the American Association for the Advancement of Science, the American College of Physicians, the National Academy of Medicine, and the Hastings Center.

== Early life and education ==
Sugarman was born to psychologists Daniel and Barbara Sugarman. Growing up in New Jersey, he attended Paramus High School and competed in gymnastics. Upon graduating, Sugarman attended Duke University for his Bachelor of Science degree in psychology. At Duke, he was chairman of the symposium committee for STEP (Science, Technology, Ethics and Policy) '82 and received the President's Leadership Award. He was also admitted into the Duke University chapter of Phi Beta Kappa. He then matriculated in the Duke University School of Medicine. After earning his medical degree, Sugarman completed a fellowship in internal medicine at Johns Hopkins School of Medicine in 1993. During his fellowship he also completed an MPH at the Johns Hopkins School of Hygiene and Public Health (1992) and an MA in applied ethics at Georgetown University (1993).

== Career ==
While in medical school, Sugarman noticed there was a linguistic divide between patients and doctors which led to miscommunication and misinformation so he began working with English professor Ronald R. Butters on this subject. They compiled and classified some of these terms into two categories: slang which is familiar to patients and differ by region and malapropism, in which the patient confuses the pronunciation of standard medical terminology. Following medical school he completed an internship in Obstetrics and Gynecology and a residency in Internal Medicine at Duke. Upon completing his fellowship at Johns Hopkins University, Sugarman accepted a position at Duke University's Medical Center. In 1999, he was appointed as founding director of the Duke Center for the Study of Medical Ethics and Humanities. In 2003, Sugarman was recruited by Michael Klag and Ruth Faden to join the faculty at Johns Hopkins Berman Institute of Bioethics. After his appointment at JHU, in 2004 Sugarman was installed in an Endowed Professorship in Bioethics and Medicine position that was supported by Harvey M. Meyerhoff.

In 2008, Sugarman was the recipient of the Distinguished Service Award by the Public Responsibility in Medicine and Research organization for his "contributions to both the field of research ethics and to PRIM&R." He was later elected a Fellow of the Association of American Physicians and the National Academy of Medicine. In 2018, he was awarded Doctor of Science, honoris causa, from New York Medical College.
