= Red tree rat =

Conservation status
- Vulnerable (IUCN 3.1)

Scientific classification
- Domain: Eukaryota
- Kingdom: Animalia
- Phylum: Chordata
- Class: Mammalia
- Order: Rodentia
- Family: Muridae
- Genus: Pithecheir
- Species: P. melanurus

Binomial name
- Pithecheir melanurus Lesson, 1840

Species of rodent

The red tree rat (Pithecheir melanurus) is a species of rodent in the family Muridae. It is found only in western Java, Indonesia.
