= William Crump =

William Crump may refer to:

- William Crump (Texas politician) (1809/10–1889), first Speaker of the Texas House of Representatives
- William Crump (MP), English politician, MP for Canterbury
- William Crump (diplomat), U.S. Chargé d'Affaires to Chile (1845–1847)
- William Crump (gardener) (1843–1932), British horticulturalist
  - William Crump, an apple (Cox's Orange Pippin x Worcester Pearmain) named for the horticulturalist
- William Jackson Crump, American lawyer and politician
- Bill Crump (1903–1995), Anglican bishop in Canada
- Bill Crump (cricketer) (1928–2022), New Zealand cricketer
- William Wood Crump (1819–1897), Virginia lawyer and politician
