= Miss Ryley's soft-furred rat =

Conservation status
- Least Concern (IUCN 3.1)

Scientific classification
- Kingdom: Animalia
- Phylum: Chordata
- Class: Mammalia
- Order: Rodentia
- Family: Muridae
- Genus: Millardia
- Species: M. kathleenae

Binomial name
- Millardia kathleenae Thomas, 1914
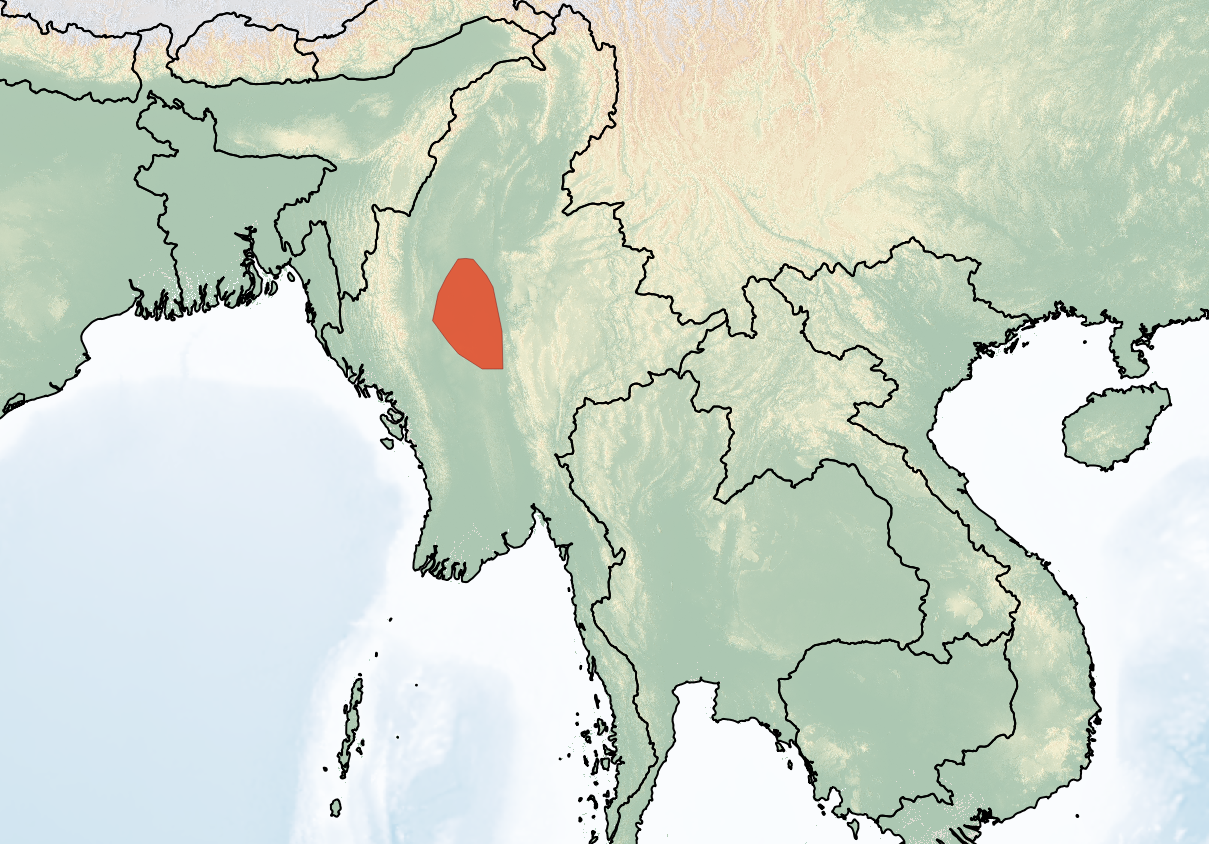

Species of rodent

Miss Ryley's soft-furred rat (Millardia kathleenae) is a species of rodent in the family Muridae. It is found only in central Myanmar, and was also recorded on Mount Popa.
