= James Harlan Steele =

American veterinarian

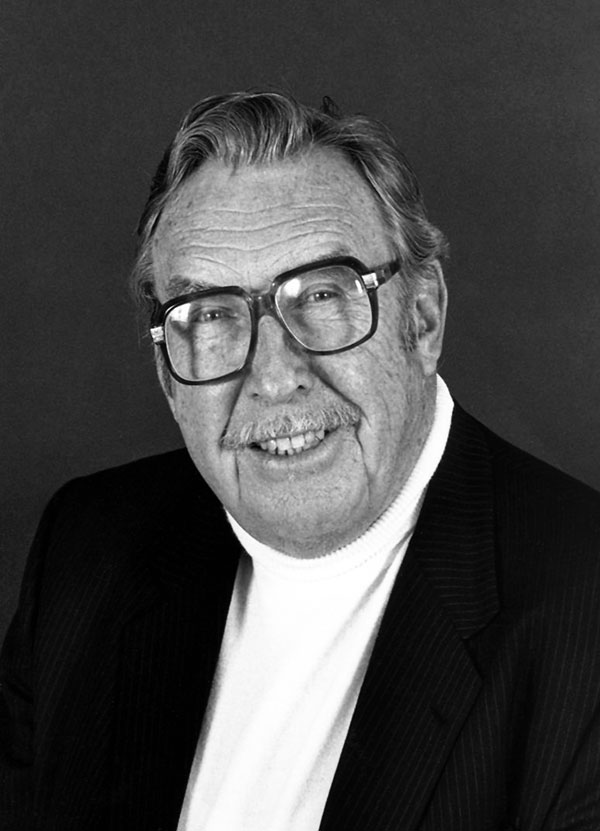

James Harlan Steele (1913–2013) was an American veterinarian recognized as “the father of veterinary public health” who led some of the first efforts to prevent the spread of disease from animals to humans.

Steele's professional career spanned more than 70 years. It began in 1938 when he worked in a brucellosis testing laboratory for the Michigan State Department of Agriculture while studying veterinary medicine at Michigan State University. Brucellosis developed in many of his veterinary colleagues, and he wanted to learn how the causative pathogen and other pathogens were transmitted from animals to humans. This marked the beginning of his lifelong vocation of studying and controlling zoonotic diseases.

In 1941, Steele received a doctorate of veterinary medicine from Michigan State University, and in 1942, he earned a master of public health degree from Harvard University. In 1943, he was commissioned as a sanitarian in the Public Health Service (PHS). He spent most of World War II in Puerto Rico and the Virgin Islands, where he coordinated milk and food sanitation programs, evaluated zoonotic threats to the islands, and conducted research on brucellosis, bovine tuberculosis, rabies, and Venezuelan equine encephalitis.
