= John Arthur Crump =

New Zealand Methodist missionary, zoologist, anthropologist, and educator

John Arthur Crump FZS JP
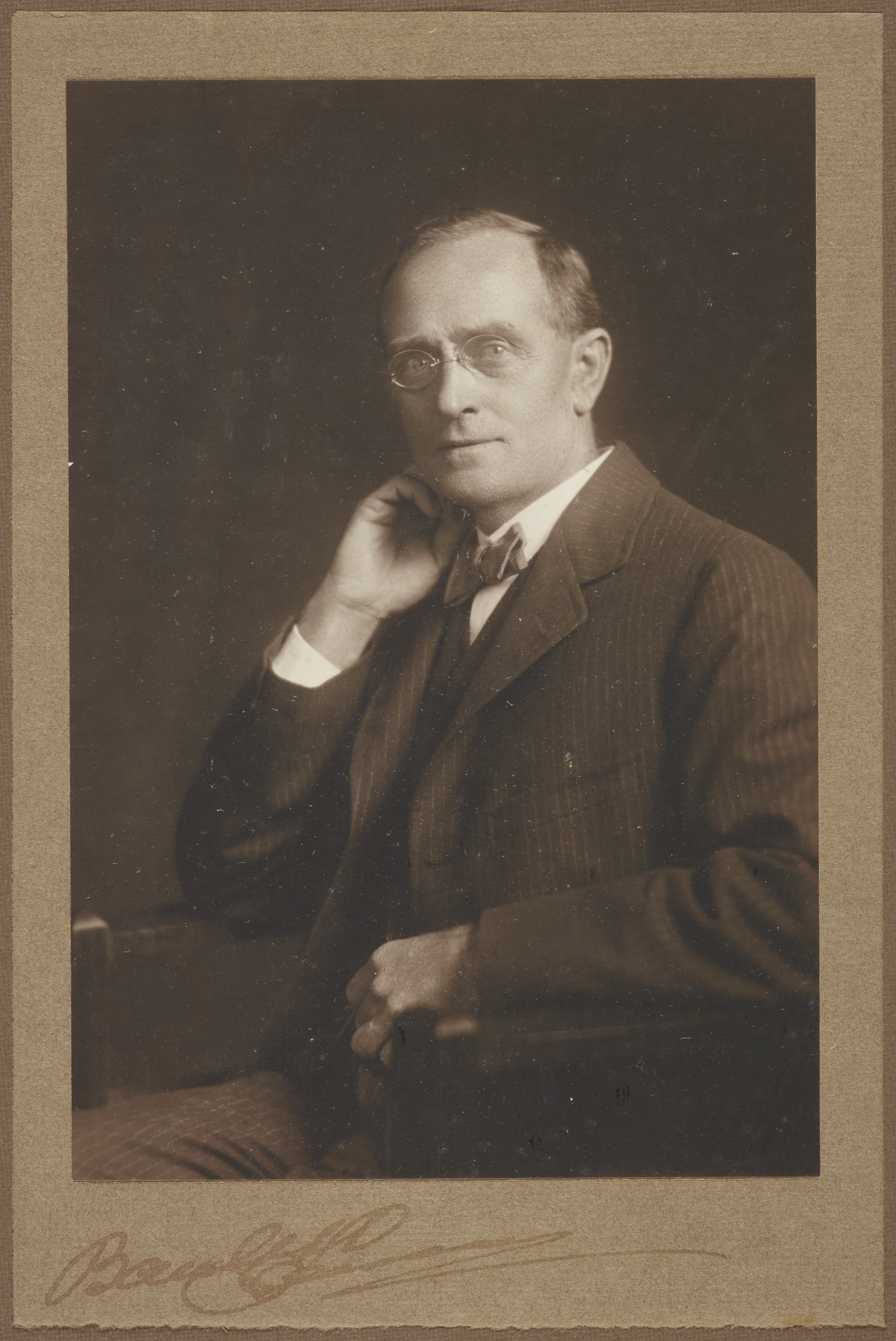
- Born: 5 December 1866; Shrewsbury, Shropshire, England
- Died: 18 November 1930 (aged 63); Blenheim, New Zealand
- Occupations: Methodist missionary; zoologist; anthropologist; educator
- Relatives: Charles Crump (uncle); Edwin Samuel Crump (cousin)

John Arthur Crump FZS JP (5 December 1866 – 18 November 1930) was a New Zealand Methodist missionary, zoologist, anthropologist, and educator.

== Early life and education ==
Crump was born in Shrewsbury, Shropshire, the fourth child and fourth son of James Crump, butcher, and Bessie Crump (née Hoyle). His father James Crump was born in Kingsland, Herefordshire, and the family's ancestral village was Brimfield, Herefordshire. John Arthur Crump's older brothers were Henry Hoyle Crump (born 1860, died 1886), James Edward Crump (born 1863, died 1893), and Charles Frederick Crump (born and died 1865).

Crump was educated at Wesley College, Sheffield, Yorkshire. He emigrated to New Zealand in 1883. After initially undertaking farm work in Canterbury and Marlborough, Crump became a Methodist preacher-on-trial in Marlborough in 1888, and a preacher from 1891 when he passed Synod examinations. He received theological training at Wesley College, Three Kings, Auckland, New Zealand, 1892–93.

== Personal life ==
Crump married Martha Alice Rose 19 March 1894. They had five children Konini Crump (born 1896), Aloha Crump (born 1898), Winiwi Crump (born 1900), Meme Crump (born 1903), and Wilfred John Crump (born 1906).

Crump was a nephew of Methodist minister to New Zealand Reverend John Crump whose family hosted him in Christchurch following his arrival in New Zealand, and of prominent English footballer, administrator, and referee Charles Crump. Crump was a first cousin of Edwin Samuel Crump, English civil engineer and inventor of the Crump weir.

== Missionary ==
The day after their wedding Crump and wife Alice departed for the mission field in New Britain, Papua New Guinea, via Wellington and Sydney, arriving at Kokopo (formerly Herbertshohe), New Britain, 19 June 1894, and then Kabakada, East New Britain, 27 June 1894. Crump worked with Methodist missionaries from other Pacific islands, especially from Samoa, and translated the New Testament into a New Britain language. In April 1897 the family was transferred to a new mission station at Kinavanua, Duke of York Islands. In July 1898 Ulu Island was purchased on behalf of the church. John and Alice Crump relocated there, establishing George Brown College to train local ministers, developing an innovative education and community development model based on coconut growing. The name Misikaram, meaning 'Mr. Crump' in Tok Pisin, was adopted as a surname by Crump's co-workers at George Brown College and remains in use as a common surname in parts of Papua New Guinea today.

Crump left the Ulu Circuit and retired as a Methodist missionary in November 1904.

== Zoologist and anthropologist ==
Crump made observations on the fauna and flora, and on indigenous and German colonial cultural practices, in East New Britain during the late 1800s. Diaries, photographs and glass slides, and an extensive collection of New Britain objects are held at The National Library of New Zealand Alexander Turnbull Collection and The Museum of New Zealand Te Papa Tongarewa.

Crump's published the first formal observations of the traditional New Britain practice of trephining for the management of depressed skull fracture, headache, and spiritual maladies.

Crump was elected a Fellow of the Zoological Society of London in July 1901 for his contributions to knowledge on the fauna of East New Britain, particularly on herpetology and ornithology.

== Educator ==
After returning from Papua New Guinea, Crump purchased a farm at Ocean Bay, Port Underwood in the Marlborough Sounds, New Zealand. Here he and Alice Crump established the Ocean Bay Aided School that was approved by the New Zealand Board of Education in 1908. The school opened officially on 5 February 1909 and operated for 15 years. The school pioneered a model of outdoor education considered the forerunner to that popularised by Kurt Hahn, Gordonstoun School, and the Outward Bound network of experiential education. The Outward Bound New Zealand programme is based at Anakiwa, near Ocean Bay in the Marlborough Sounds. The Ocean Bay School produced a number of notable alumni, including New Zealand-born British barrister John Platts-Mills.

== Death ==
Crump died on 18 November 1930 during a visit to Blenheim from Ocean Bay.
