= Bed sill =

Low underwater dam

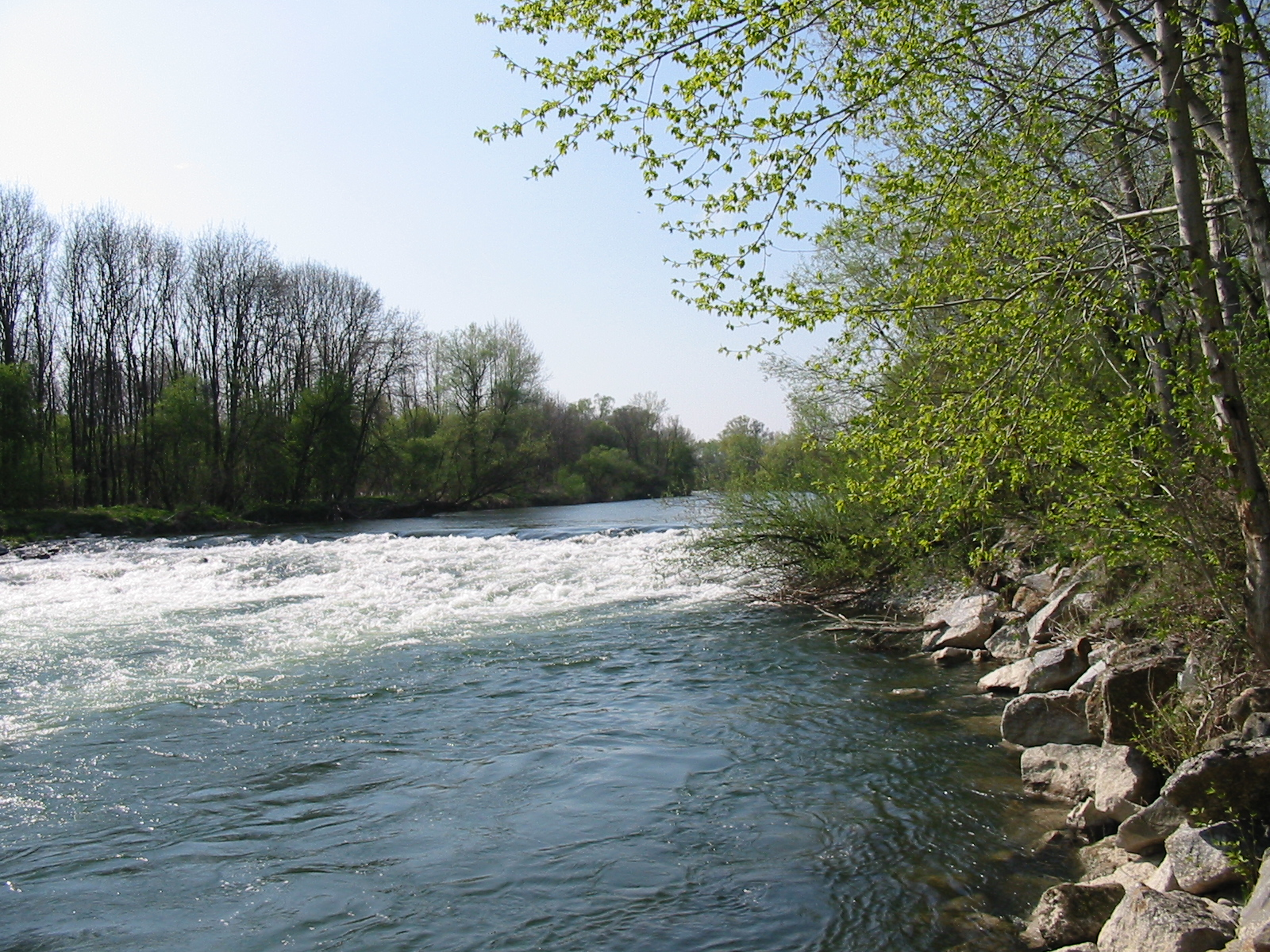
Bed sill in the Ybbs near Amstetten, Lower Austria

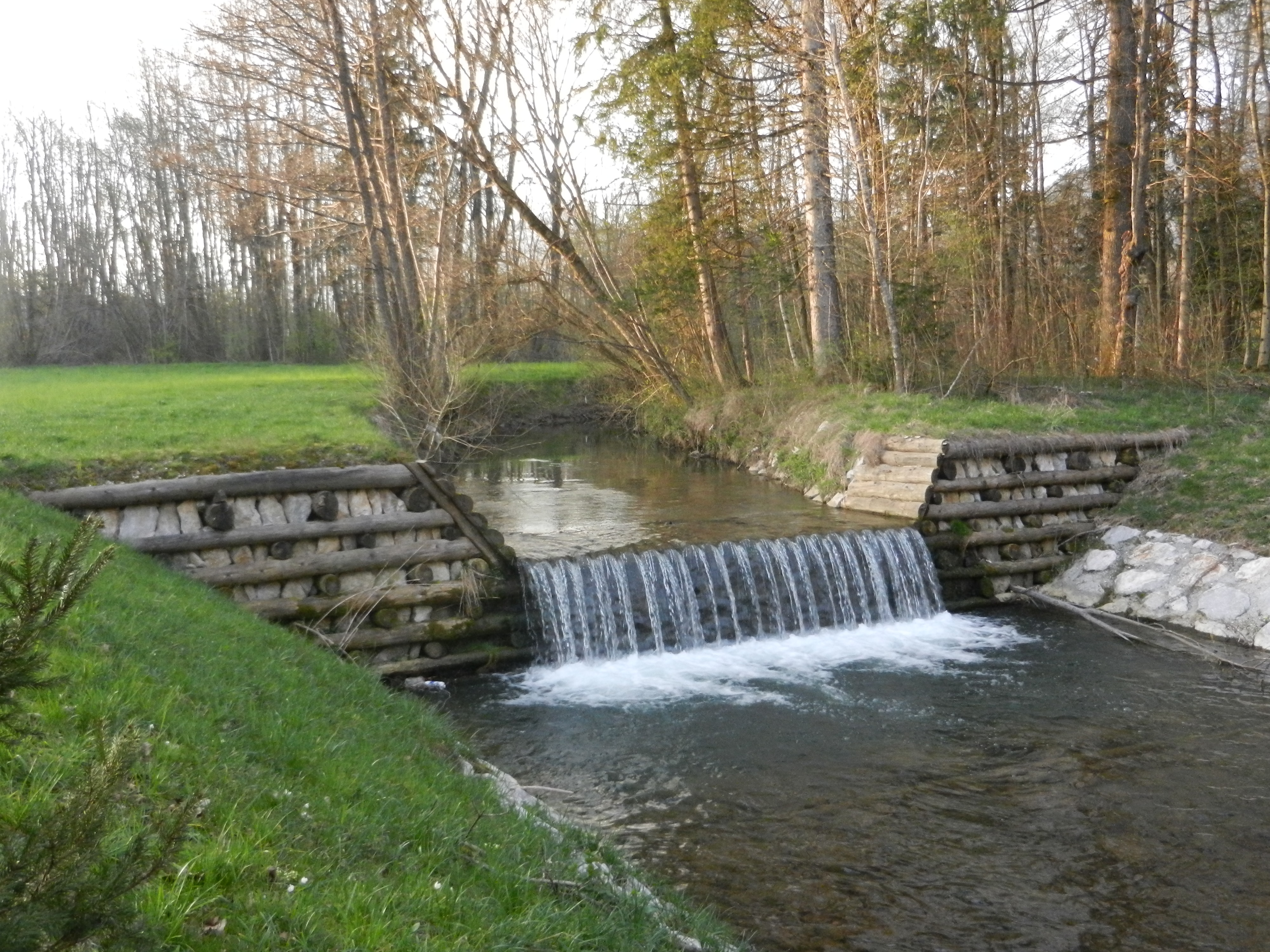
A crib wall serving as a bed sill

A bed sill, also called a ground sill or low weir, is a river training structure running across a river transverse to the direction of flow, built to reduce bed erosion. Common forms of construction include stone rockfill, rows of driven piles, timber crib walls and concrete sills.

Bed sills have the disadvantage that they cannot be passed by aquatic organisms. For this reason they are frequently rebuilt as:

- bed slides (gradient 1:20 to 1:30)
- bed ramps (1:3 to 1:10).

Lenzi et al. (2003) state that the term "sill" applies to the lower structures (less than 1.5-2 m in height), and "check dam" is used for taller ones.

== See also ==
- Weir
- Drop structure, a generic term for bed sill, check dam, weir, etc.
- Groyne, an underwater structure arranged at an angle to the riverbed

== Sources ==
- "Bed sill". BAWiki. Bundesanstalt für Wasserbau. 23 October 2019. "Control structure lying in the river bed perpendicular to the flow extending beyond it."
- Hütte, Michael (2000). Ökologie und Wasserbau: ökologische Grundlagen von Gewässerverbauung und Wasserkraftnutzung [Ecology and Hydraulic Engineering: Ecological Foundations of Watercourse Modification and Hydropower Use] (in German). Wiesbaden: Vieweg. ISBN 3-528-02583-2.
- Julien, Pierre Y. (2002). River Mechanics. Cambridge: Cambridge University Press. ISBN 0-521-52970-0.
- Lenzi, Mario A.; Marion, Andrea; Comiti, Francesco (2003). "Interference processes on scouring at bed sills". Earth Surface Processes and Landforms. 28 (1): 99–110. doi:10.1002/esp.433.
