= R. A. Crump =

American politician (1854-1922)

Robert A. Crump (July 4, 1854 – July 4, 1922) was a state legislator in Arkansas. He represented Sebastian County, Arkansas in the Arkansas House of Representatives in 1915.

He lived in Greenwood, Arkansas. Tate died on July 4, 1922, in a fire at his one of his homes while saving his son and family who lived in the home.

He served as a deputy sheriff and four years in the Arkansas legislature. He had lived in Fort Smith for three years and was living in Fayetteville at the time of his death.
