= Okaramio River =

Coordinates: 41°24′S 173°46′E

Location
- Country: New Zealand

Physical characteristics
- Mouth
  - location: Kaituna River

The Okaramio River is a river of the Marlborough Region of New Zealand's South Island. It flows into the Kaituna River approximately halfway between Renwick and Havelock.

== See also ==
- List of rivers of New Zealand
