= Soft-furred rat =

Conservation status
- Least Concern (IUCN 3.1)

Scientific classification
- Kingdom: Animalia
- Phylum: Chordata
- Class: Mammalia
- Order: Rodentia
- Family: Muridae
- Genus: Millardia
- Species: M. meltada

Binomial name
- Millardia meltada (Gray, 1837)

Synonyms
- Golunda meltada Gray, 1837; Mus comberi Wroughton, 1907; Mus lanuginosus Elliot, 1839; Mus listoni Wroughton, 1907; Rattus meltada ssp. meltada(Gray, 1837); Rattus meltada ssp. pallidor(Ryley, 1914)

Species of rodent

The soft-furred rat (Millardia meltada), or soft-furred metad, is a species of rodent in the family Muridae native to South Asia.

== Description ==
Head and body length is 13–16 cm. Tail ss 12–14 cm. Yellowish to brownish gray dorsally and whitish in the underparts. Tail naked, blackish above, paler beneath. Fine dense fur shorter ventrally. Many shortish whiskers. Males are larger.

== Distribution and habitat ==
The species occurs in India, Nepal, Pakistan and Sri Lanka, at altitudes from sea level to 2,670 m asl. It inhabits tropical and sub-tropical forests and grasslands, also making use of irrigated croplands and other cultivated areas.
