= Malayan tree rat =

Conservation status
- Data Deficient (IUCN 3.1)

Scientific classification
- Kingdom: Animalia
- Phylum: Chordata
- Class: Mammalia
- Order: Rodentia
- Family: Muridae
- Genus: Pithecheir
- Species: P. parvus

Binomial name
- Pithecheir parvus Kloss, 1916

Species of rodent

The Malayan tree rat (Pithecheir parvus) is a species of rodent in the family Muridae. It is found only in Malaysia.
