= Josiah Crump =

American postal clerk (c. 1838–1890)

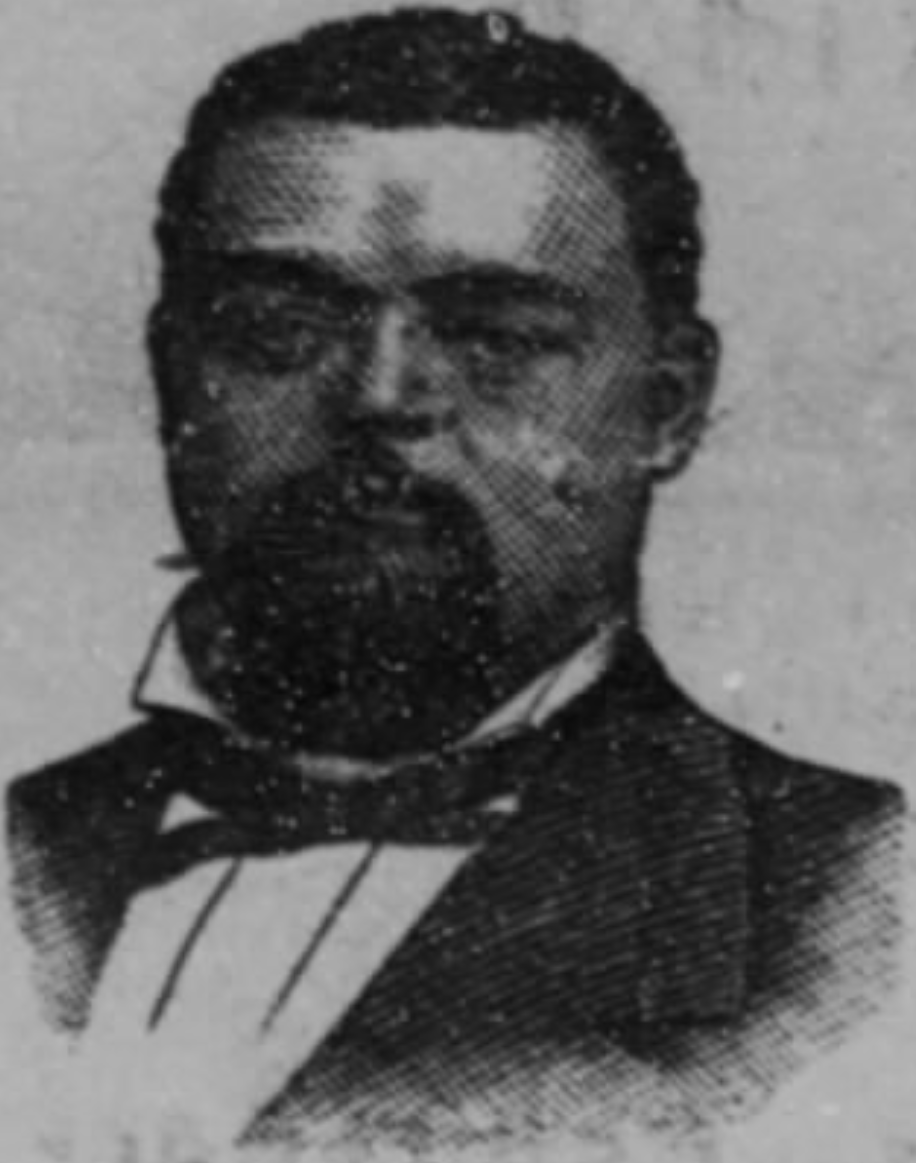
- Drawing of Crump in Richmond Planet
- Born: c. 1838; Richmond, Virginia, U.S.
- Died: February 15, 1890; Richmond, Virginia, U.S.
- Occupations: Postal worker; politician; captain
- Years active: 1876 to 1884; 1888 to 1890
- Spouse: Fernella Meriweather (m. 1883)
- Children: 3

Josiah Crump (c. 1838 – February 15, 1890) was an African American postal clerk and at one point in 1879, was the only one in the city of Richmond, Virginia. Crump also served as a military captain in one of Richmond's militias and served on the city's council for about ten years. He was also an ally of Elizabeth Van Lew, a Virginia abolitionist that also operated a spy ring during the Civil War.

== Biography ==
Little is concretely known about Crump's early life, although it is known that he was born in Richmond to Johanna and Josiah Crump around 1838. It is also unknown whether he was born enslaved or free, but records have him marked as "free" by 1860, when he was living in Richmond with his mother and her new husband, James Robinson. Crump was employed for a time hauling freight with his stepfather until 1871, when he began working with the postal system. He served as the head of the mailing division of the Richmond Post Office for 16 years. On December 19, 1883, he married Fernella Meriweather, with whom he had three children. In his later life Crump opened a grocery store.

He died in his home on February 15, 1890, of pyaemia. His funeral was extremely well attended and Crump's desk and chair at the council building were draped in black as a memorial.

== Political career ==
In the early to mid 1870s Crump began showing an interest in politics and in May 1876 he was elected to Richmond's bicameral city council. Crump served on the board of aldermen for about eight years from 1876 to 1884, then again a few years later from 1888 to 1890, his death. During his tenure he addressed issues that were important to the people he represented in the Jackson Ward area and served on the city's Committee on Ordinances, a committee typically staffed entirely by whites. Crump, along with others, managed to greatly improve the lives for many African Americans in their area by establishing a night school and by effectively putting an end to the body snatching of African-American cadavers.

In 1880 Crump served as a member of the Republican State Committee and during that same year he tried to nominate Ulysses S. Grant for a third term as president. Crump was also a supporter of the Readjusters and in 1881, he was elected as a temporary chair for a factio of the Republican State Committee that endorsed a coalition with this group. The following year Crump was elected to serve on the board of Petersburg's Central Lunatic Asylum, where he served in various capacities.
