= Crump's mouse =

Crump's mouse Temporal range: recent

Conservation status
- Data Deficient (IUCN 3.1)

Scientific classification
- Kingdom: Animalia
- Phylum: Chordata
- Class: Mammalia
- Order: Rodentia
- Family: Muridae
- Tribe: Millardini
- Genus: Diomys; Thomas, 1917
- Species: D. crumpi

Binomial name
- Diomys crumpi Thomas, 1917
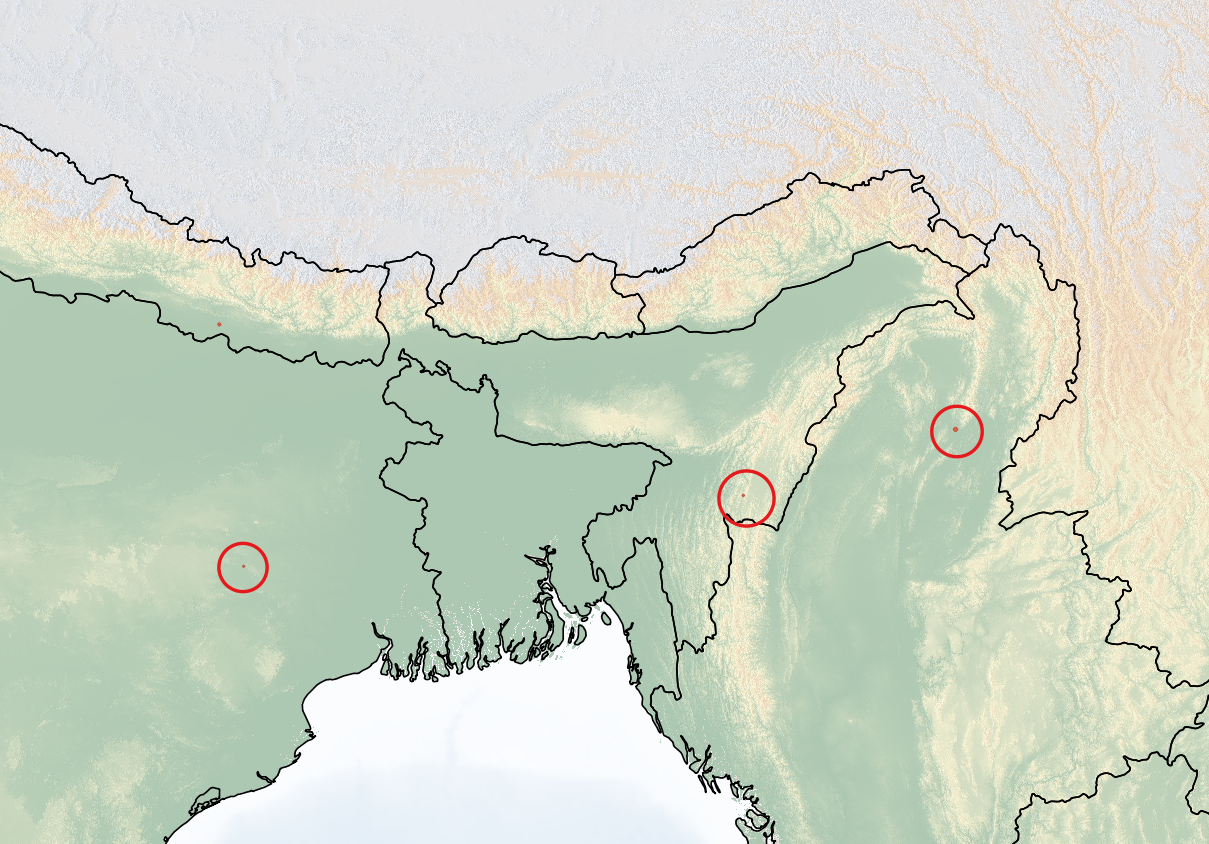

Species of rodent

Crump's mouse (Diomys crumpi) is a species of rodent in the family Muridae. It is the only species in the genus Diomys, and is found in northern India (recorded in Bihar and Manipur), southern Nepal (recorded in the Central Terai), and northern Myanmar (recorded in Namti). Its natural habitat is subtropical or tropical dry forests.
