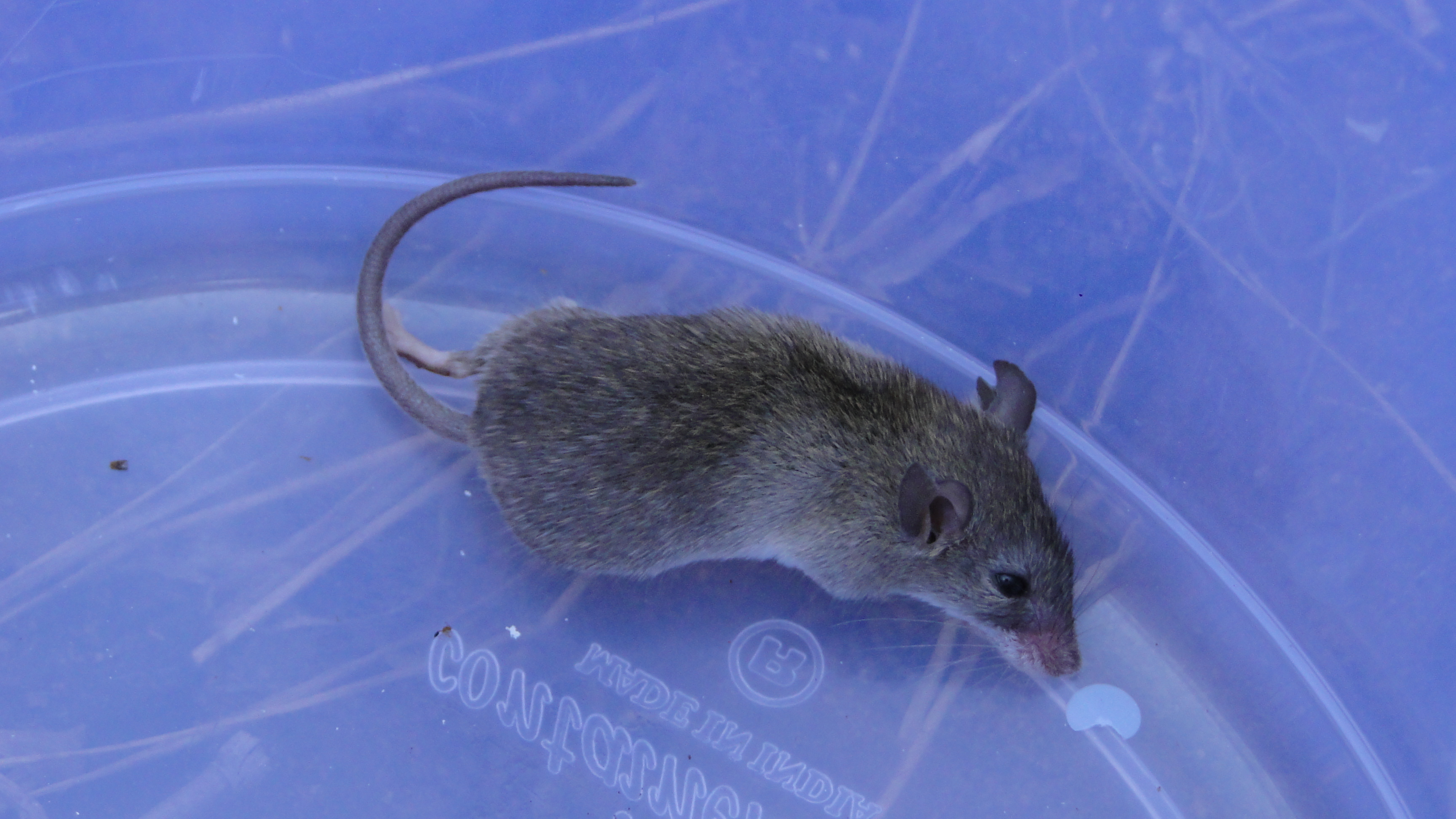

Conservation status
- Least Concern (IUCN 3.1)

Scientific classification
- Kingdom: Animalia
- Phylum: Chordata
- Class: Mammalia
- Order: Rodentia
- Family: Muridae
- Genus: Cremnomys
- Species: C. cutchicus

Binomial name
- Cremnomys cutchicus Wroughton, 1912

Synonyms
- Cremnomys australis Thomas, 1916; Cremnomys australis ssp. siva Thomas, 1916; Cremnomys cutchicus ssp. leechi Harrison, 1974; Cremnomys cutchicus ssp. medius (Thomas, 1916); Cremnomys medius ssp. caenosa Thomas, 1916; Cremnomys medius Thomas, 1916; Cremnomys medius ssp. rajput Thomas, 1916; Cremnomys medius ssp. caenosus Thomas, 1916; Rattus cutchicus ssp. rajput (Thomas, 1916); Rattus cutchicus ssp. siva (Thomas, 1916); Rattus cutchicus (Wroughton, 1912); Rattus cutchicus ssp. australis (Thomas, 1916); Rattus cutchicus ssp. cutchicus (Wroughton, 1912)

= Cutch rat =

Species of rodent

The Cutch rat or Cutch rock rat (Cremnomys cutchicus) is a species of rodent in the family Muridae.

It is found in India and is widely distributed across the states of Andhra Pradesh, Bihar, Gujarat, Jharkhand, Karnataka, and Rajasthan.
