= Edwin Samuel Crump =

English civil engineer

Edwin Samuel Crump CIE
- Born: 6 July 1882; Wolverhampton, Staffordshire, England
- Died: 5 March 1961 (aged 78); Benson-on-Thames, Oxfordshire, England
- Occupation: Civil engineer
- Father: Charles Crump
- Relatives: John Arthur Crump (cousin)

Edwin Samuel Crump CIE (born 6 July 1882, died 5 March 1961) was an English civil engineer specialising in hydraulics. He joined the Indian Service of Engineers in 1906 and is known for inventing the 'Crump weir', a structure used for measuring flow in open channels.

== Early life and education ==
Crump was born in Wolverhampton, Staffordshire, England, the youngest child of Charles Crump and Clara Annie Crump (née Gittoes). His father Charles Crump was Chief Clerk, Northern Division, Great Western Railway Company, prominent football legislator and administrator, and committed Methodist. Edwin Crump was educated as a civil engineer at the Department of Engineering, Imperial College.

== Personal life ==
Crump married Helen Elizabeth Jefferis in 1913 and had two sons, Anthony Jefferis Crump (born 1914) and Colin Edwin Crump (born 1916).

== Career and accomplishments ==
Edwin Samuel Crump joined the Indian Service of Engineers in 1906 and was based in Punjab Province, British India. Here he was engaged in irrigation projects of the Punjab Water Station. Crump developed key concepts of outlet flexibility and proportional distribution, introduced the 'Crump outlet,' and provided hydraulic formulations influencing canal module design and irrigation practice. Crump was the inventor of the 'Crump weir' that is named after him. The Crump weir is a two dimensional triangular weir with a horizontal crest in the transverse direction and a triangular crest shape in the stream-wise direction. Crump weirs are used as measuring structures in open channels.

During World War I Crump served as an engineer in South Africa. Crump retired from the Indian Service of Engineers in 1937. After returning to England, Crump joined in 1949 the newly established Hydraulics Research Station at Wallingford, Oxfordshire, part of the Hydraulic Research Organisation, Department of Scientific and Industrial Research. In 1952 he was promoted to Senior Scientific Officer, retiring in 1956.

== Honors and recognition ==
Crump was made Companion of the Indian Empire (CIE) at the King's Birthday Honours of 1936 for his work with the Indian Service of Engineers as Superintending Engineer, Public Works Department (Irrigation Branch), Punjab Province.

The Crump weir is named for its inventor, Edwin Samuel Crump.

== Publications ==
Crump published a number of seminal papers in the field of hydraulics, including methods to accurately measure stream flow by means of the Crump weir, design of steeply graded pipelines, and vortex-siphon spillways.

== Death ==
Edwin Samuel Crump died at his home Blenheim House, Benson, Oxfordshire, on 5 March 1961.
