= Charles Crump (cricketer) =

New Zealand cricketer

Personal information
- Born: 7 November 1837; Derby, England
- Died: 22 February 1912 (aged 74); Palmerston, Otago, New Zealand

Domestic team information
- Years: Team
- 1864/65–1867/68: Otago
- Source: ESPNcricinfo, 8 May 2016

Charles Crump (7 November 1837 – 22 February 1912) was a New Zealand cricketer. He played two first-class matches for Otago, one in each of the 1864–65 and 1867–68 seasons.

Crump was born at Derby in England in 1837 and moved to New Zealand in 1862. He played for an Otago side against George Parr's touring English side in February 1864 before making his first-class debut the following season in a match against Canterbury. His other first-class match was against the same side during the 1867–68 season. Crump scored a total of eight runs in the three innings in which he batted, with a highest score of five.

Working as a commercial agent, Crump served as the town clerk of the Waihemo County Council in North Otago for about 25 years. He resided at Palmerston for 44 years until his death there in February 1912 at the age of 74.
