= Charles Crump (footballer) =

English footballer (1840–1923)

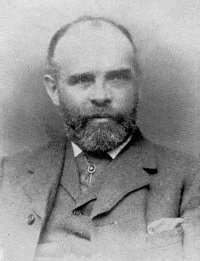

Personal information
- Full name: Charles Crump
- Date of birth: 15 December 1840
- Place of birth: Kingsland, Herefordshire
- Date of death: 15 April 1923 (aged 82)
- Position: Forward

Senior career*
Years	Team	Apps	(Gls)
1871–1881	Stafford Road		
- * Club domestic league appearances and goals

Charles Crump (15 December 1840 – 15 April 1923) was an English footballer, administrator, and referee.

== Early life and education ==
Crump was born in Kingsland, Herefordshire, the eighth child and sixth son of Thomas Crump, butcher, and Elizabeth Crump (née Morris). In 1853 Crump moved to Shrewsbury, Shropshire, where he became a butcher's errand boy for older brother James Crump.

== Personal life ==
Crump married Anne Howard on 31 October 1867 and they had a son Charles Crump (born 1869). Anne died in 1871. Charles remarried to Clara Anne Gittoes on 19 October 1876 and they had five children, Francis Joseph Crump (born 1877), Clara Ann Crump (born 1878), Gertrude Alice Crump (born 1879), Jennie (Jane) Louise Crump (born 1881), and Edwin Samuel Crump (born 1882), a prominent civil engineer specialising in hydraulics.

Like many early footballers, Crump was a deeply committed Christian. He served as Superintendent of the Darlington Street Wesleyan Sunday School in Wolverhampton for 40 years where his second wife and children served as teachers. Crump supported the Royal Wolverhampton Orphanage and Wolverhampton Charity Association.

== Career ==
On 13 March 1857, Crump joined the Great Western Railways Company at the Stafford Road Works, Wolverhampton, as a junior clerk. He started as a boy clerk in the wagon office and was transferred to the locomotive department in November 1857. He was considered a highly capable officer and was promoted to Chief Clerk, Northern Division, in July 1868, a position that he held until his retirement in December 1905.

== Playing career ==
As Superintendent of the railway works at the Stafford Road depot in Wolverhampton, he founded the Stafford Road Football Club and played for the club for a decade, including scoring both of the club's goals in the 1876-77 Birmingham Senior Cup final. His final competitive match for the Roadsters was in the FA Cup against the Old Etonians F.C. in 1881.

== Administrator ==
He was the first President of the Birmingham Football Association on its foundation in 1875, a position he held until after his 80th birthday.

Crump was elected to The Football Association Council in 1883, becoming its vice-president in 1886 until his death in 1923, notably serving alongside Football Association president Arthur Kinnaird for more than two decades from 1890 until 1923. In this role, Crump was considered to have an encyclopaedic knowledge of the rules of football, an enthusiastic love for the game, and an ability to quickly identify the point of an issue with a strong power for analysis.

Crump was a prominent leader of the movement against professionalism, a stance which resulted in Aston Villa withdrawing from the Birmingham Senior Cup in 1885.

Crump was a member of the Football International Board, where he was renown for his ability to solve difficult problems in connection with laws and regulations of the game. He was a member of the Football Association's Emergency Committee, a member of the Football League, and a valued member of the Appeals Committee.

Crump presided at the FA Cup Final in 1911 where he presented the winner's cup to Bradford City.

Crump was a significant figure in the development of the Wolverhampton Wanderers Football Club for which he served as vice-president.

== Referee ==
In common with a number of football club leading figures, on retirement from the playing game Crump became a referee, taking charge of FA Cup ties and the first League matches. He was also the English nominee as umpire in a number of international matches, and was umpire in FA Cup finals in the mid-1880s.

Charles Crump had many functions in football administration from president of local FAs to Senior Vice-president of the (national) FA. He was also a referee and took charge for instance of the 1883 FA Cup Final (featured in the British television series The English Game), and the first official match at Molineux, the Wolverhampton Wanderers pitch.

== Death ==
Charles Crump died at the North British Hotel, Edinburgh, Scotland, on 15 April 1923, shortly after attending the England against Scotland football match at Hampden Park, Glasgow.
