= Big-eared hopping mouse =

Conservation status
- Extinct (1843) (IUCN 3.1)

Scientific classification
- Kingdom: Animalia
- Phylum: Chordata
- Class: Mammalia
- Order: Rodentia
- Family: Muridae
- Genus: Notomys
- Species: †N. macrotis

Binomial name
- †Notomys macrotis Thomas, 1921

Extinct species of rodent

The big-eared hopping mouse (Notomys macrotis) is an extinct species of mouse, which lived in the Moore River area of south-western Australia. The big-eared hopping mouse was a small, rat-sized animal resembling a tiny kangaroo. It had large eyes and ears with a brush-tipped tail. It moved on its four legs when traveling at a slower pace, or by bounding upon its enlarged, padded, hind feet when traveling quickly. They mainly lived in sand dunes and made nests of leaves and other organic materials. The big-eared hopping-mouse was last collected in July 1843 near the Moore River, Western Australia, close to where New Norcia is now situated, and has not been seen since.

The big-eared hopping mouse was among many hopping mice to be extinct, and its absence from extensive sub-fossil collections suggests it was restricted to Western Australia.

Of the six taxa with ranges limited to Western Australia, five are considered threatened or vulnerable and one, the big-eared hopping mouse, is extinct. Under the Western Australian Wildlife Conservation Act of 1950, the hopping mouse is listed as "fauna presumed to be extinct" and under Commonwealth legislation, simply "extinct". We only know about the hopping mouse from two damaged specimen: one from which the location it was found in is unknown and one at Moore River in Western Australia. The last record dates from 19 July 1843 and was collected in Perth around the Moore River and King George's Sound by John Gilbert, who was employed by John Gould. Land around the Moore originally consisted of coastal heathland, woodland, and forest. Gilbert focused primarily on rodent species, but collected several rodent species, including Notomys macrotis. It is known from two damaged specimens held in the Natural History Museum in London. There is speculation as to whether the species was last collected in July 1843, for in the 19th and early 20th centuries there was an absence of scientific data in the area of which the big-eared hopping mouse inhabited. Drying conditions throughout much of the continent of Australia likely account for the relatively poor Miocene fossil record.

Murid rodents likely entered northern Australia from Southeast Asia through relatively dry corridors sometime between 8 and 5 million years ago, during the late Miocene. Perhaps during this period, many modern groups of rodents underwent explosive radiations to produce the high diversity of species lineages that are present today, including the big-eared hopping mouse. The mammal order Rodentia has an extensive non-Australian representation and almost certainly arrived as diversified groups with closer phylogenetic relationships to non-Australian mammals. During the Pliocene period, directly following the Miocene period, mammal communities In Australia began to change as a result of this fairly recent influx of new orders and families, which would have included the big-eared hopping mouse.

Alternatively, murids may have entered Australia already differentiated into various groups. This potential is, however, limited by the total absence of rodents in the late Miocene Alcoota and Ongeva Local Faunas of the Northern Territory. Currently there is no evidence or scientific method to test these alternative scenarios.

Seven species of native Australian rodent have become extinct and several others have significantly declined in numbers since the settlement of Europeans in Australia. These rodents make up 48% of the total mammals extinct in Western Australia. The hopping mouse was probably the first Australian mammal to succumb to European settlers. Hopping mice are vulnerable to agriculture and pastoralism, as well as introduced cats. During a plague, mice can comprise up to 100% of the diet of a feral cat, lending support to the theory that feral cats were the primary cause of their extinction.

By the 1850s, feral cats inhabited the Western Australian wheatbelt; they targeted a number of larger rodents throughout Western Australia. However, extinction occurred before the red fox came to Western Australia. The big-eared hopping mouse had no defenses against Australia's introduced species. Its extinction can possibly be shown as a ramification of environmental alteration by humans, and predation is another likely possibility, but the true reason for the extinction is uncertain. The presumed decade of extinction is unknown, but is possibly the 1860s, which was soon after the date of the last known specimen.

Australian rodents, not including the big-eared hopping mouse, currently comprise roughly 25% of the modern species-level diversity of terrestrial mammals of the continent.

There are many known reasons for the extinction of the big-eared hopping mouse. These factors include; the predation by feral cats, exotic disease, habitat loss and fragmentation, as well as, habitat degradation and the depletion of resources as a result of livestock and feral herbivores. Each of these causal factors are rated with differing levels of "consequence" in effecting the extinction of the big-eared hopping mouse.

Exotic disease held a severe to catastrophic position in contributing to the extinction of the big-eared hopping mouse. An epizootic disease had a heavy impact on a large number of mammal species in Western Australia, Notomys macrotis included. This disease in conjunction with drought conditions and the presence of feral cats helped lead to the extinction of the big-eared hopping mouse.

Habitat degradation, loss and fragmentation all had moderate to severe ratings for the extinction of this species. The big-eared hopping mouse lived in sand dune environments, the same of which were used in the 1800s for sheep herding, as well as mass land clearing. Both of these impacted the condition of the soils, grass, nutrients, leaves, and other organic materials in the mouse's habitat. The destruction of their burrows, resources, and food supply led to the extinction of this species.

In addition to the well known causes for the big-eared hopping mice's extinction there are other factors that may have influenced its extinction as well. Certain characteristics that the big-eared hopping possessed such as its size, location and niche might have influenced its ultimate extinction. Studies have shown that by comparison mammals in Australia have lower resting metabolic rates than those of other continents. Studies have also shown that small animals, such as the big-eared hopping mice need high resting metabolic rate to attain the large metabolic scope needed in order to regulate body temperature. Consequently, an animal with a high resting metabolic rate has "reduced mortality and increased longevity and fecundity". In short the fact that the big-eared hopping mouse lived in a location where animals have a relatively low resting metabolic rate in addition to its need of a high metabolic rate due to its size might have been factors that influenced its extinction. Moreover, the niche that the big-eared hopping mice occupied may have also led it down the path of extinction. The big-eared hopping mouse exhibited "morphological or physiological adaptations to their particular way of life". This mouse had a specialized niche, an extinction promoting trait because "species that were both rare and specialized were especially vulnerable to extinction".

Within the genus Notomys there exist two clades. The big eared hopping mouse Notomys macrotis is classified in the same clade as the short-tailed hopping mouse, Notomys amplus, and the great hopping mouse, Notomys sp, both of whom are extinct. They are classified together due to their similar size. It also shares similar morphology with the fawn hopping mouse, Notomys cervinus, and the long-tailed hopping mouse, Notomys longicaudatus, due to the fact that they all lack the derived reproductive tract of the spinifex hopping mouse (Notomys alexis) clade Its closest phylogenetic relative is probably Notomys cervinus.

== Notes ==
- Woinarski, John Casimir Zichy, Andrew Burbidge, and Peter Harrison. The Action Plan for Australian Mammals 2012. CSIRO, 2014. Print.
- Webb, S. 2008 (August): Megafauna demography and late Quaternary climatic change in Australia: A predisposition to extinction. Boreas, Vol. 37, pp. 329–345.
- William Z. Lidicker, J.H. Calaby, A.K. Lee. 1989 Rodents: A World Survey of Species of Conservation Concern. IUCN, pp. 53–54.
- Morris, K.D. "Csiro Publishing." Csiro Publishing. 27. (2000): n. page. Web. 25 Oct. 2012.
- Morris, K. D. "The Status and Conservation of Native Rodents in Western Australia." Wildlife Research 27 (2000): 405-19. Csiro. Csiro. Web.
