= Macaronesia =

Archipelagos in the North Atlantic Ocean

Coordinates: 24°15′24″N 22°28′16″W

Macaronesia

Macaronesia (Portuguese: Macaronésia; Spanish: Macaronesia) is a collection of four volcanic archipelagos in the North Atlantic Ocean, off the coast of North Africa and Europe. Each archipelago is made up of a number of Atlantic oceanic islands, which were formed by seamounts on the ocean floor whose peaks have risen above the ocean's surface.

Each of the archipelagos is a distinct political entity: the Azores and Madeira are autonomous regions of Portugal, the Canary Islands is an autonomous community of Spain, while Cape Verde, a former Portuguese colony, is a sovereign state and member of the United Nations. Politically, the islands belonging to Portugal and Spain are parts of the European Union, while Cape Verde is a member of the African Union. Geologically, most of Macaronesia is part of the African tectonic plate. The Azores are located in the triple junction between the Eurasian, African, and North American plates. (Note: The islands of Flores and Corvo are in the North American plate, the island of Santa Maria is in the African plate, the rest of the islands are in the diffuse boundary between the Eurasian and the African plates.)

In one biogeographical system, the Cape Verde archipelago is in the Afrotropical realm while the other three archipelagos are in the Palearctic realm. According to the European Environment Agency, the three archipelagos within the European Union constitute a unique bioregion, known as the Macaronesian Biogeographic Region. The World Geographical Scheme for Recording Plant Distributions places the whole of Macaronesia in its botanical continent of Africa.

In 2022, Macaronesia had an estimated combined population of 3,222,054 people; 2,172,944 (67%) in the Canary Islands, 561,901 (17%) in Cape Verde, 250,769 (8%) in Madeira, and 236,440 (7%) in the Azores.

== Etymology ==
The name Macaronesia was originally used by Ancient Greek geographers to refer to any islands west of the Strait of Gibraltar. It is derived from the Greek words meaning 'islands of the fortunate' (μακάρων νῆσοι, makárōn nēsoi). The term fell out of use until it was revived in 1917 with its current meaning.

The name is occasionally misspelled "Macronesia" in false analogy with Micronesia, an unrelated group of archipelagos in the Pacific Ocean whose name is also derived from Greek.

== Archipelagos ==
The flags of the Macaronesian archipelagos

Macaronesia consists of four main archipelagos. In alphabetical order, these are:

- Azores: autonomous region of Portugal
- Canary Islands: autonomous community of Spain
- Cape Verde: sovereign state, a member of the United Nations
- Madeira (including the Savage Islands): autonomous region of Portugal

== Geography and geology ==
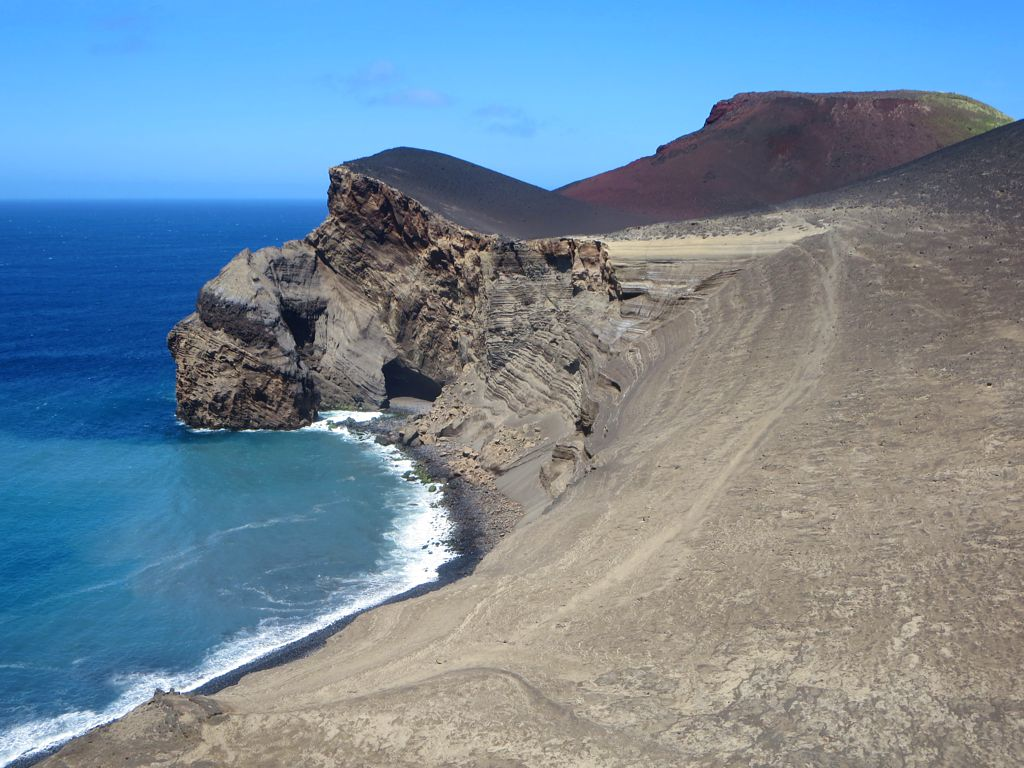
Layers of volcanic tephra from the 1957 eruption of Capelinhos on Faial in the Azores. Macaronesian islands are created by volcanic activity.

The islands of Macaronesia are volcanic in origin, and are thought to be the product of several geologic hotspots. Due to the geographic location, varied relief and altitudinal ranges, the Macaronesian mountains represent a wide range of climates. These climates include oceanic, Mediterranean, and humid subtropical climates in the Azores; the tropical savanna climates in Madeira; the desert and semi-desert climates in the Canary Islands; and a tropical climate in Cape Verde.

In some locations, there are variations in climate due to the rain shadow effect. The laurel forests of Macaronesia are a type of mountain cloud forest with relict plant species of a vegetation type that originally covered much of the Mediterranean basin, when the climate of that region was more humid. These plant species, many of which are endemic, have evolved to adapt to the islands' variable climatic conditions.

The Macaronesian islands have a biogeography that is unique in the world. They are home to several distinct plant and animal communities. Notably, the jumping spider genus Macaroeris is named after Macaronesia. Because none of the Macaronesian islands were ever part of any continent, all of the native plants and animals reached the islands via long-distance dispersal. Laurel-leaved forests, called laurisilva, once covered most of the Azores, Madeira, and parts of the Canaries at an altitude of between 400 and 1,200 metres (1,300 and 3,900 ft), the eastern Canaries and Cape Verde being too dry.

These forests resemble the ancient forests that covered the Mediterranean basin and northwestern Africa before the cooling and drying of the ice ages. Trees of the genera Apollonias, Clethra, Dracaena, Ocotea, Persea, and Picconia, which are found in the Macaronesian laurel forests, are also known, from fossil evidence, to have flourished around the Mediterranean before the ice ages.

== Conservation issues ==
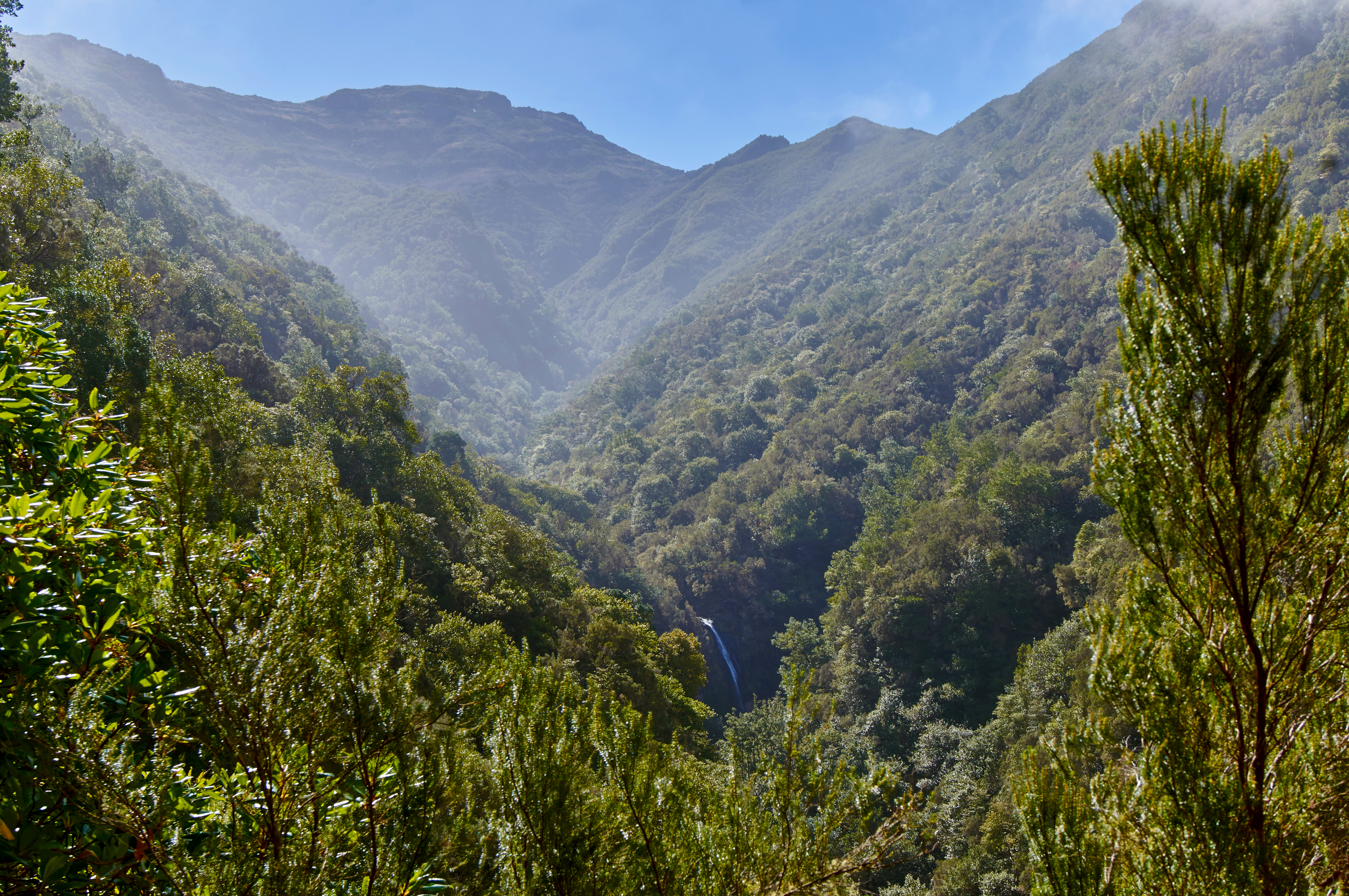
Remaining patches of Macaronesia's threatened primeval laurel forest, except in Cape Verde, were protected by European Union law in 2001.

Much of the original native vegetation has been displaced because of human activity, including felling forests for timber and firewood, clearing vegetation for grazing and agriculture, and introducing foreign plants and animals into the islands. The laurel forest habitat has been reduced to small disconnected pockets. As a result, many of the endemic biota of the islands are now seriously endangered or extinct.

Introduced predators – in particular domestic cats, many in feral populations – currently pose one of the most serious threats to the endemic fauna. Even though cats prey mostly on other foreign-introduced mammals, such as rodents and rabbits, the abundance of such prey sustains such a large feline population that it has initiated a so-called hyperpredation process, which further increases that population's negative impact on the number of endemic reptiles and birds.

Since 2001, the European Union's conservation efforts, mandated by its Natura 2000 regulations, have resulted in the protection of large stretches of land and sea in the Azores, Madeira, and the Canary Islands, totalling 5,000 km^{2} (1,900 sq mi).

== See also ==
- Fortunate Isles
- Geology of the Azores
- Geology of the Canary Islands
- Geology of Cape Verde
- Geology of Madeira
- Laurel forest
- List of islands in the Atlantic Ocean
- Regions of Europe
- West Africa
