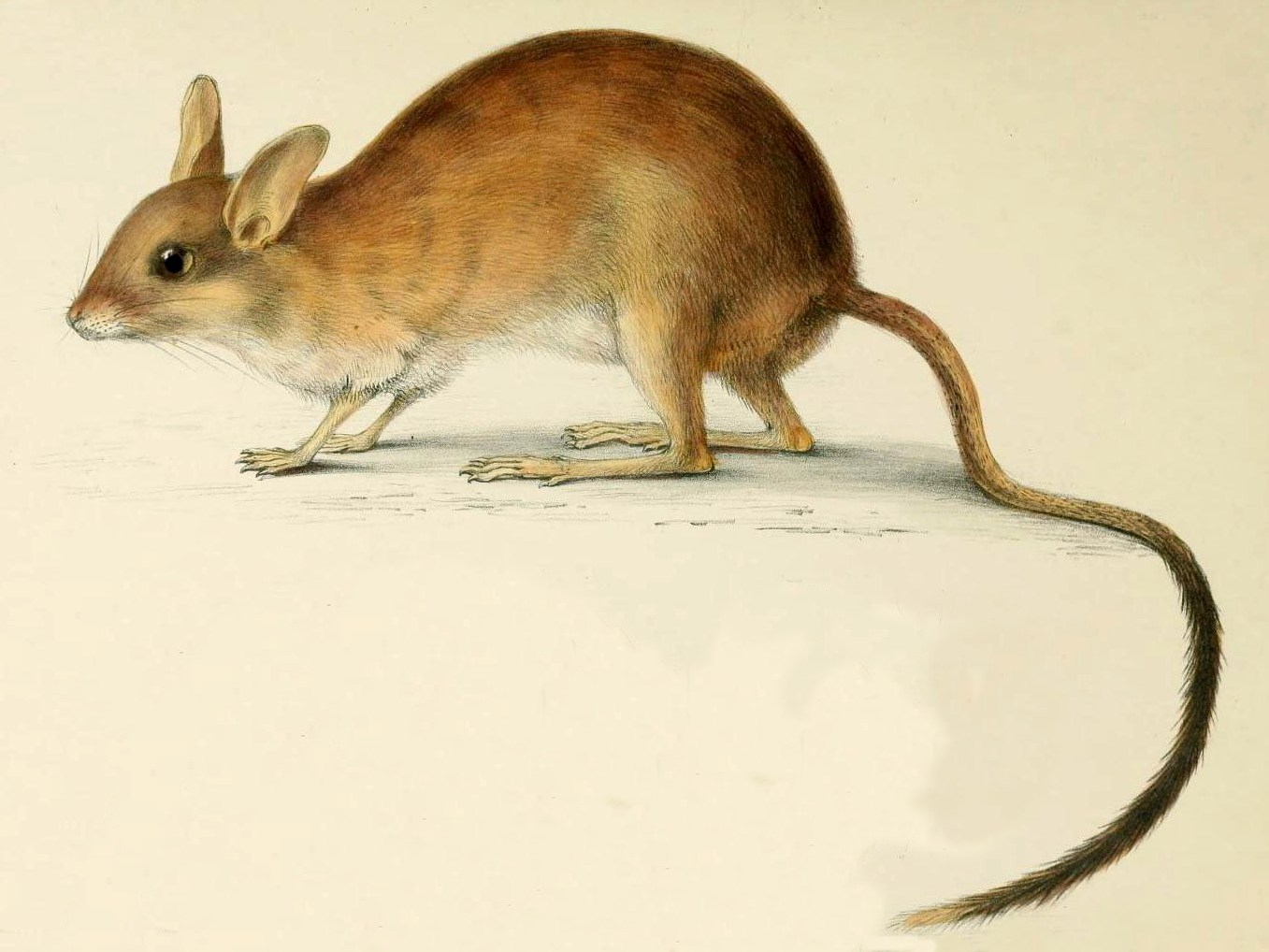
- Illustration of Notomys longicaudatus

Conservation status
- Extinct (1901 or possibly 1902) (IUCN 3.1)

Scientific classification
- Kingdom: Animalia
- Phylum: Chordata
- Class: Mammalia
- Order: Rodentia
- Family: Muridae
- Genus: Notomys
- Species: †N. longicaudatus

Binomial name
- †Notomys longicaudatus (Gould, 1844)

= Long-tailed hopping mouse =

Species of mammal

The long-tailed hopping mouse (Notomys longicaudatus) is an extinct species of rodent in the family Muridae. It was found only in Australia. It is known from a handful of specimens, the last of which was collected in 1901 or possibly 1902. It is presumed to have become extinct within a few decades from then – possibly several decades in view of a skull fragment found in an owl pellet in 1977. The cause of extinction is unknown, but may be a variety of factors including predation and habitat alteration. Little is known of its biology other than that it dug burrows in stiff clay soils. It was less a pest to humans than other hopping mice, although it would eat raisins. The mouse was mainly gray in colour with small pink ears and big eyes with a long hairy pink tail about two inches longer than its own body. It was first described by John Gould on the basis of specimens sent to him from Australia.

== Taxonomy ==
The specimens were obtained in 1843 by John Gilbert. Gilbert sent five specimens that he collected to John Gould, who published the description as Notomys longicaudatus. The first specimen was discovered near Alice Springs, while Gilbert was on a scientific expedition to Australia.

== Description ==
The average adult would measure about 10–11 inches, according to official measurement by John Gould. The body without the tail would be about 4 inches in length in adults. The tail without the body would be about 6–7 inches in length in adults. The mouse had a grey coat with pink ears, large black eyes, and a long pink tail with bristles of hair on it. Unlike its relatives such as the short-tailed hopping mouse, the great hopping mouse, and the Mitchell's hopping mouse, the long-tailed hopping mouse was small compared to its long tail.

== Diet ==
The diet of the long-tailed hopping mouse consisted of fruits, grain, and plants. According to John Gould, the long-tailed hopping mouse liked raisins very much, but it was not considered a pest like its relatives. Long-tailed hopping mice would stay near farms and grocery stores because of the decrease in food the rapid populating was causing.

== Distribution and habitat ==
The long-tailed hopping mouse's habitat was in inland Australia. It ranged in the Northern Territory, South Australia, New South Wales and Western Australia. It preferred dry humid areas where there was greenery with it. The long-tailed hopping mouse dug burrows in clay-like ground and would use the excess soil to build layers above the ground to collect dew and moisture in the morning so it would have some type of water source.

== Decrease and extinction ==
It was not until the 1890s that the long-tailed hopping mouse was considered endangered. The last known report of a live long-tailed hopping mouse was in 1901, when a captive individual died at an Adelaide scientific lab. The theory of the long-tailed hopping mouse's extinction was that it became extinct either due to rapid population increases in its habitat or because of over-hunting by foxes, wild cats, thylacines, hawks, and owls. Although the long-tailed hopping mouse has been considered extinct since 1901, a skeleton was discovered near Kalgoorlie in 1944, and a skeleton of a long-tailed hopping mouse was discovered in an owl pellet in 1977. Although those two specimens have been discovered, it will not be considered still living until a live specimen is captured.
