= Darling Downs hopping mouse =

Conservation status
- Extinct (1840s) (IUCN 3.1)

Scientific classification
- Kingdom: Animalia
- Phylum: Chordata
- Class: Mammalia
- Order: Rodentia
- Family: Muridae
- Genus: Notomys
- Species: †N. mordax

Binomial name
- †Notomys mordax Thomas, 1922.

Extinct species of rodent

The Darling Downs hopping mouse (Notomys mordax) is an extinct species of mammal in the family Muridae. It is known from a single skull found at Darling Downs, Queensland, Australia. Introduced predators such as foxes and domestic cats may have forced this species into extinction. The skull is identified as one of the Notomys, the hopping mice, an Australian genus that has been subject to rapid declines in populations leading to local and species extinction.

The skull is comparable to the species Notomys mitchellii, still extant at southern coastal regions, although significant differences in the dentition distinguish this species. The provenance of the holotype was disputed after its description, although later authors reviews saw no reasonable foundation to this suggestion. The description as a new species was disputed in the early twentieth century, with proposals it be recognised as a large specimen of the Mitchell's hopping mouse. The situation was complicated by the discovery of subfossil remains at Coonabarabran that correspond to the species N. mitchelli (NE New South Wales), leaving three uncertain scenarios on the former range or speciation in the area.

The description of the species was published by Oldfield Thomas in 1922. His examination of 'jerboa-rats' (Notomys) at the British Museum, and in correspondence with Troughton at the Australian Museum, saw the publication of this species and the widespread Notomys alexis associated with the spinifex vegetation of the arid central region. Thomas had noted the skull in his 1921 revision of Notomys, but hesitated to assign it as a new species until he examined other material.
