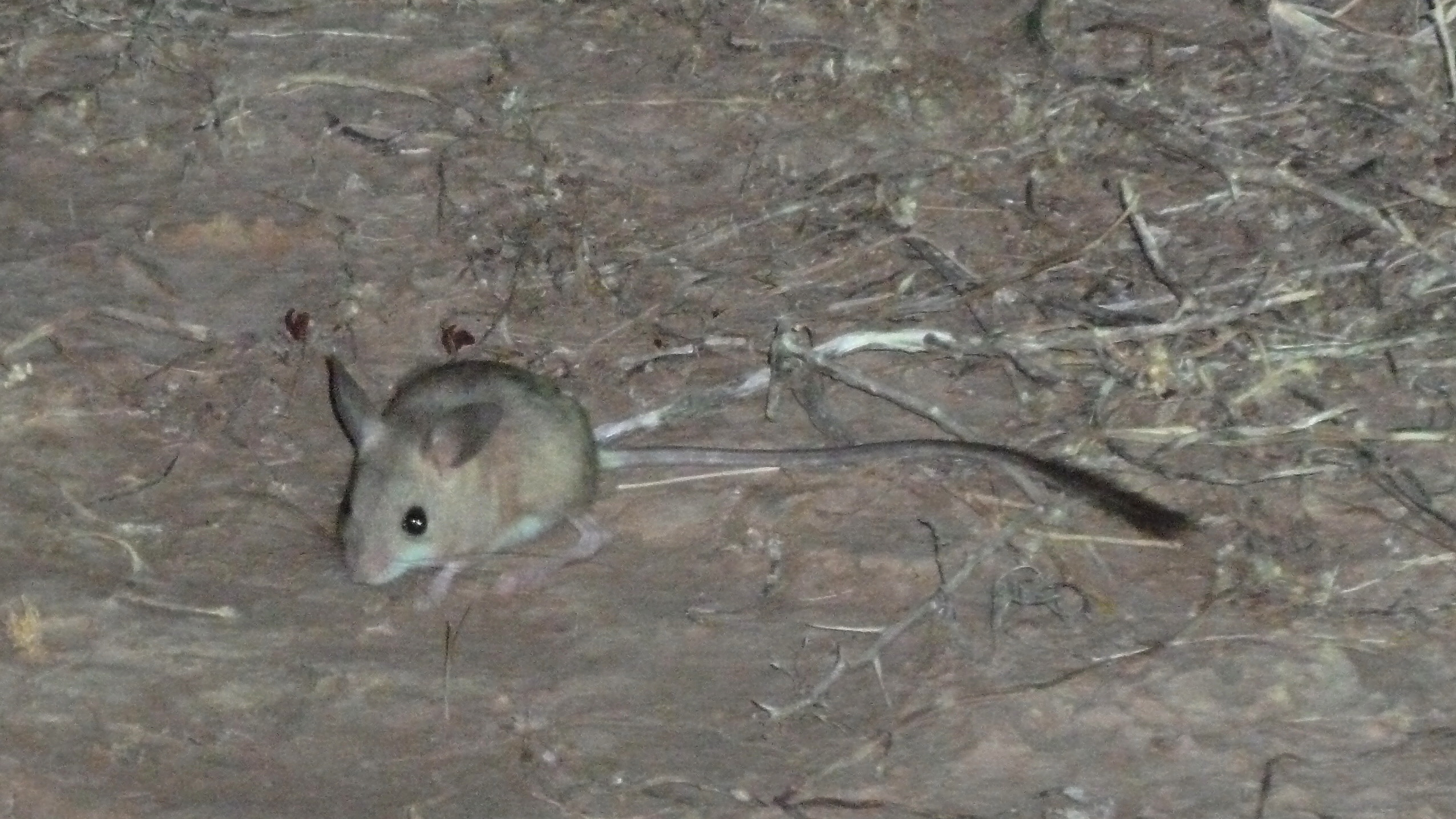

Conservation status
- Near Threatened (IUCN 3.1)

Scientific classification
- Kingdom: Animalia
- Phylum: Chordata
- Class: Mammalia
- Order: Rodentia
- Family: Muridae
- Genus: Notomys
- Species: N. cervinus

Binomial name
- Notomys cervinus (Gould, 1853)

= Fawn hopping mouse =

Species of rodent

The fawn hopping mouse (Notomys cervinus) is a medium sized rodent endemic to the Channel Country Bioregion of northeast South Australia and southwest Queensland in Australia. They inhabit open gibber (stony) and clay plains of the Lake Eyre basin. While the population and distribution has been greatly reduced since European settlement, the current population shows little evidence of significant decline and is consequently listed as 'Near Threatened'.

== Taxonomy ==
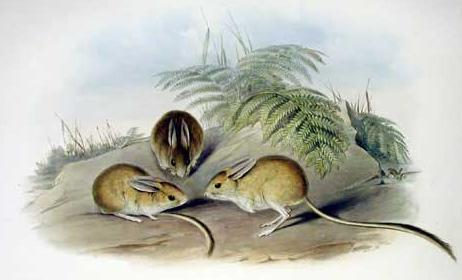
From Gould, Mammals of Australia

The first description of this species was published by John Gould from a holotype of unknown collection location from Victoria. It was presented to the Zoological Society of London and published in 1853. The description was aided by several paratype specimens also from an unspecified location and donation. It was determined to be segregated by habitat from the dusky hopping mouse (Notomys fuscus) and identifiable by lacking throat pouches. Also by the males having a naked area of glandular skin.

== Description ==
The fawn hopping mouse is a medium sized rodent weighing between 30 and 50 g (1.1 and 1.8 oz) with a head and body length between 10 and 12 cm (3.7 to 4.7 in). Its bi-coloured tail is longer than the length of the body reaching a length of 12–16 cm (4.7 to 6.3 in) ending with a tuft of dark hairs. The head is broad and short with large, long ears with distinctive large protuberant eyes. Whiskers on the muzzle are extremely long reaching a length of up to 6.5 cm (2.6 in). The hind legs and feet are very elongated similar to other hopping mouse species. This allows for efficient movements through the environment.

=== Identification ===
The colour range of the upper body between individuals varies from a pale pinkish-fawn to grey. The underside is white with the tail following a similar colour pattern to the rest of the body except the dark brush at the tip. The absence of throat pouches in both males and females can be used to distinguish fawn hopping mouse from the closely related species the dusky hopping mouse (Notomys fuscus) and spinifex hopping mouse (Notomys alexis). The presence of a naked area of glandular skin on the chest between the forelimbs of males (and some females) can also be used to distinguish between species.

== Distribution and habitat ==
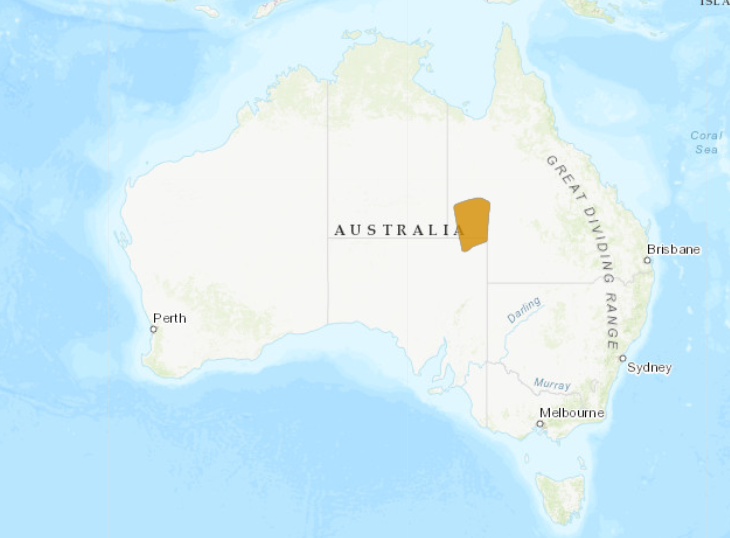
Current distribution of the fawn hopping mouse (Notomys cervinus), Image: IUCN Red List

=== Current range ===
The current endemic range of the fawn hopping mouse is largely reduced to the Channel Country Bioregion north-east South Australia and south-west Queensland. Restricted to a quarter of the area surrounding the Lake Eyre Basin with a patchy distribution. Records from the 19th century and anecdotal evidence from the 1930s show that the former range of this species was much larger and suggests it may have existed in a broader range of habitats. The historical range included most of the Lake Eyre Basin, southern Northern Territory, and the eastern edge of the Nullarbor Plain as well as western New South Wales. Subfossil evidence supports this broader range along with some specimens have been found in Western Australia around the Nullarbor Plain.

=== Historical range ===
The species is currently listed as extinct in NSW and the Northern Territory. Insubstantial evidence for the species has been found in Charlotte Waters, Alice Springs, Uluṟu-Kata Tjuṯa National Park and Curtin Springs. Targeted surveys conducted in 2008 and 2009 in the south-eastern Northern Territory failed to locate the species leading to it being declared extinct. From known pre-European range, the overall decline of the species is higher than 50% since the 1950s.

=== Habitat ===
The preferred habitat of the fawn hopping mouse is open gibber and clay plains in arid environments. These are smaller areas of overlying sand with sparse vegetation. Small ephemeral grasses and forbs dominate these environments with the occasional taller perennial plant.

== Behaviour and Ecology ==
=== Behaviour ===
The fawn hopping mouse constructs burrows in sand patches, or in gibber or claypans when soil is softened after rain. These are simpler and shallower than the ones constructed by dusky hopping mouse up to a metre deep and have between one and three entrances. One individual will have at least two burrows in the system. Fawn hopping mice can be either solitary or live in small groups made up of two to four individuals. This species is nocturnal, using its burrows during the day to avoid the highest extreme temperatures.

=== Diet ===
These animals can travel hundreds of metres while foraging. Their diet consists of predominantly seeds but they will eat green shoots and insects if available. They do not require fresh water to drink, as they can obtain most water from succulent saltwater plants (halophytes). If necessary, they can also consume salt water due to a high salt tolerance, excreting excess salt in concentrated urine and faeces. Adult males have hairless patches of glandular skin on their chest underneath the forearms. This is inferred to be used for scent-marking and is present in pregnant or lactating females.

=== Breeding ===
Breeding in this species follows an opportunistic pattern, occurring in periods of productivity when conditions are favourable. As such, the population of fawn hopping mice can increase significantly following exceptionally high rainfall during high plant productivity. Conversely, the population contracts significantly during dry periods with low plant productivity. The reproduction rate is lower than other hopping mouse species with between one and five pups. After mating, the gestation period has been observed in captivity to be between 38 and 40 days with fully furred young being born. The young become fully independent within a month of being born. There is currently little data on the reproductive age or the life span of this species. However other closely related species can breed within a few months after birth and can live for around 5.3 to 6.4 years of age. The generation rate of this species is estimated to be around 2.5 to 3.6 years.

== Conservation ==
=== Threats ===
The main threat to the fawn hopping mouse is predation from introduced predators mainly cats (Felis catus) and foxes (Vulpes vulpes). Hyperpredation by cats has been linked to the reduction of rodent populations of similar size to fawn hopping mice in low productivity landscapes. However, the presence of cats in the favoured environment is rare reducing the effect on the population allowing the species to have survived. While foxes are more present in this environment their impact on this species is yet to be determined in an official setting. Habitat changes from land degradation and overgrazing by feral livestock and invasion of weeds have also had an effect on the population of this species. Domestic and feral ungulates can cause degradation of vegetated patches of sand by excessive trampling leading to destabilisation and increased erosion. The higher stocking rates of livestock prior to 1950 may have been an influence on the historical decline of the range and population of this species. Overgrazing by livestock and introduced herbivores can reduce the amount of resources available and lead to population decline. Climate change from reduced rainfall, increased temperatures and the increasing frequency of droughts may also have an impact on the species. Again, these effects are yet to be quantified.

=== Conservation assessment ===
The fawn hopping mouse is currently listed as 'Extinct' in NSW and as a result of 'Least Concern'. The fawn hopping mouse is currently presumed extinct in the Northern Territory and the most recent confirmed record of the species was in 1895. A targeted survey of historical locations and key ideal habitats were conducted between 2008 and 2009 and failed to locate the species. Additional comprehensive surveys in the Finke Bioregion and Charlotte Waters also failed to locate the species. This resulted in the species being presumed extinct in the Northern Territory and listed as 'Least Concern'. The population size of the fawn hopping mouse is prone to fluctuate in size due to the boom-and-bust nature of their environment. So it can be difficult to determine population decline however, there is currently little evidence to suggest there is ongoing decline of this species. The current population is therefore listed as near threatened as a result.

=== Conservation efforts ===
There are currently no specific management strategies or recovery plans in place for the fawn hopping mouse. However, there are some measures that could be put in place to aid population numbers. The implementation of broad scale or intensive control of feral cats and foxes where possible and if appropriate. Assessing the impact of introduced predators on the population of this species. Assess the impact and response of different grazing patterns and identify the threshold of unsustainable grazing. Identifying areas which are resistant to drought and implementing protection plans for these areas. The use of existing monitoring strategies to develop a way to track populations across representative areas of range.
