= Montérégie =

- Administrative region
- Coordinates: 45°23′N 73°06′W
- Country: Canada
- Province: Quebec
- Regional County Municipalities (RCM) and Equivalent Territories (ET): 14 RCM, 1 ET

Area
  - Total: 8,825 km^{2} (3,407 sq mi)

Population (2016)
  - Total: 1,507,070
  - Density: 135.4/km^{2} (351/sq mi)
- Demonym: Montérégien(ne)
- Time zone: UTC-5 (EST)
  - Summer (DST): UTC-4 (EDT)
- Postal code: J
- Area code: 450, 579; 514, 438 (Île Perrot)
- Website: monteregie.gouv.qc.ca

Montérégie (French pronunciation: [mɔ̃teʁeʒi]) is an administrative region in the southwest part of Quebec. It includes the cities of Boucherville, Brossard, Châteauguay, Longueuil, Saint-Hyacinthe, Saint-Jean-sur-Richelieu, Salaberry-de-Valleyfield and Vaudreuil-Dorion.

The region had a population of 1,507,070 as of the 2016 census and a land area of 11,132.34 square kilometres (4,298.22 mi^{2}), giving it a population density of 135.4 inhabitants per square kilometre (351 inhabitants/mi^{2}). With approximately 18.5% of the province's population, it is the second most populous region of Quebec after Montreal. The majority of the population lives near the Saint Lawrence River, on the south shore of Montreal.

Montérégie is known for its vineyards, orchards, maple trees, panoramas, and the Monteregian Hills. The region is both urban (second in terms of population in Quebec) and rural. The regional economy is based on agriculture and the production of goods and services. Tourism also makes up a significant portion of the economy.

== History ==
Jacques Cartier named Mont Royal in October 1535. Samuel de Champlain built several forts to protect the colonists against the Iroquois from south of the Great Lakes, and against the English, who were colonizing New England to the southeast.

The toponym comes from the Latinized form of Mount Royal, mons regius. Montérégie is named for the Monteregian Hills, which are, in turn, named for Mont Royal (English: Mount Royal). The term for naming the set of hills in the St. Lawrence Plain was originally created in 1903 in English by geologist Frank Dawson Adams to designate a new petrographic province.

Mount Royal on Montreal Island, although outside the Montérégie region, is one of the Monteregian Hills. In addition to Mount Royal, two other Montérégie hills are not located in Montérégie: Mount Mégantic, in Estrie, and the hills of Oka, in the Lower Laurentians.

Montérégie was populated by the St. Lawrence Iroquoian people when the French began to colonize here in the early 16th century. Later colonists found their villages abandoned, and the area controlled as hunting grounds by the nations of the Iroquois Confederacy based south of the Great Lakes.

Some of the later battles among the European-Canadians that decided the destiny of Canada took place in Montérégie. For instance, in the 1830s, ethnic French patriots rebelled against British government troops. The Province of Canada (also called a United Canada (French: Canada-Uni)) was formed through the Union Act in 1840 and February 1841, from the former provinces of Lower Canada and Upper Canada.

Originally, the administrative territory of the Montérégie parishes were taken from the territory of the canonical Diocese of Saint-Jean-Longueuil.

== Subregions ==
The Montérégie has three administrative subregions, each consisting of its own regional county municipalities (RCM) or equivalent territories. The territorial administration of the region was conducted by three regional conferences of elected officers (French: Conférences régionales des élus) (CRE) separate and independent in their territory:

- Longueuil,
- Montérégie-Est (eastern RCMs) and
- Vallée-du-Haut-Saint-Laurent (western RCMs).

Each sub-region was organized in the same way as other administrative regions of Quebec.

=== Regional county municipalities ===

There are 12 regional county municipalities and one equivalent territory in Montérégie. In 2021, Brome-Missisquoi and La Haute-Yamaska transferred to Estrie.

==== Montérégie-Est ====
As of 2021, there are seven RCMs in Montérégie Est. Its seat is McMasterville, and the president is Arthur Fauteux. Its territory occupies 7,122.92 square kilometres (2,750.17 mi^{2}) and there are 656,287 inhabitants, with a population density of 92.1 people/km^{2} (239 people/mi^{2}).

Regional County Municipality (RCM)	Population Canada 2016 Census	Land Area	Density (pop. per km^{2})	Seat of RCM
Acton	15,594	579.80 km^{2} (223.86 sq mi)	26.9	Acton Vale
La Vallée-du-Richelieu	124,420	588.60 km^{2} (227.26 sq mi)	211.4	McMasterville
Le Haut-Richelieu	117,443	936.02 km^{2} (361.40 sq mi)	125.5	Saint-Jean-sur-Richelieu
Les Maskoutains	87,099	1,302.90 km^{2} (503.05 sq mi)	66.9	Saint-Hyacinthe
Marguerite-D'Youville (formerly Lajammerais until January 2011)	77,550	346.04 km^{2} (133.61 sq mi)	224.1	Verchères
Pierre-De Saurel (formerly La Bas-Richelieu until January 2009)	51,025	597.55 km^{2} (230.72 sq mi)	85.4	Sorel-Tracy
Rouville	36,536	483.12 km^{2} (186.53 sq mi)	75.6	Marieville

==== Vallée-du-Haut-Saint-Laurent ====
There are five RCMs in Vallée-du-Haut-Saint-Laurent. Its seat is Salaberry-de-Valleyfield, and its president is Yves Daoust. Its territory occupies 3,727.22 square kilometres (1,439.09 mi^{2}) and there are 435,436 inhabitants, with a population density of 116.8 people/km^{2} (303 people/mi^{2}).

Regional County Municipality (RCM)	Population Canada 2016 Census	Land Area	Density (pop. per km^{2})	Seat of RCM
Beauharnois-Salaberry	64,320	471.26 km^{2} (181.95 sq mi)	136.5	Beauharnois
Le Haut-Saint-Laurent	22,454	1,173.51 km^{2} (453.09 sq mi)	19.1	Huntingdon
Les Jardins-de-Napierville	27,870	803.07 km^{2} (310.07 sq mi)	34.7	Napierville
Roussillon	171,443	423.82 km^{2} (163.64 sq mi)	404.5	Saint-Constant
Vaudreuil-Soulanges	149,349	855.56 km^{2} (330.33 sq mi)	174.6	Vaudreuil-Dorion

=== Equivalent territory ===
Equivalent Territory (ET)	Population Canada 2016 Census	Land Area	Density (pop. per km^{2})	Seat of ET
Agglomeration of Longueuil	415,347	282.21 km^{2} (108.96 sq mi)	1,471.80	Longueuil

== Indian reserves ==
The population of both of these reserves are majority-Mohawk, one of the historic Five Nations of the Haudenosaunee, or Iroquois League. Kahnawake was established south of Montreal in 1719 as a mission village. Akwesasne was established upriver by Mohawk leaders and their families in the mid-18th century, accompanied by French Jesuit missionaries. Akwesasne spans the boundaries of Canada and the United States, extending across the St. Lawrence River into New York State, where it is referred to as the St. Regis Reservation.

- Akwesasne (part)
- Kahnawake

== Major communities ==
- Beloeil
- Boucherville
- Brossard
- Candiac
- Chambly
- Châteauguay
- La Prairie
- Longueuil
- Mont-Saint-Hilaire
- Saint-Bruno-de-Montarville
- Saint-Constant
- Saint-Hyacinthe
- Saint-Jean-sur-Richelieu
- Saint-Lambert
- Saint-Lazare
- Sainte-Catherine
- Sainte-Julie
- Salaberry-de-Valleyfield
- Sorel-Tracy
- Varennes
- Vaudreuil-Dorion
