= Geology of Cape Verde =

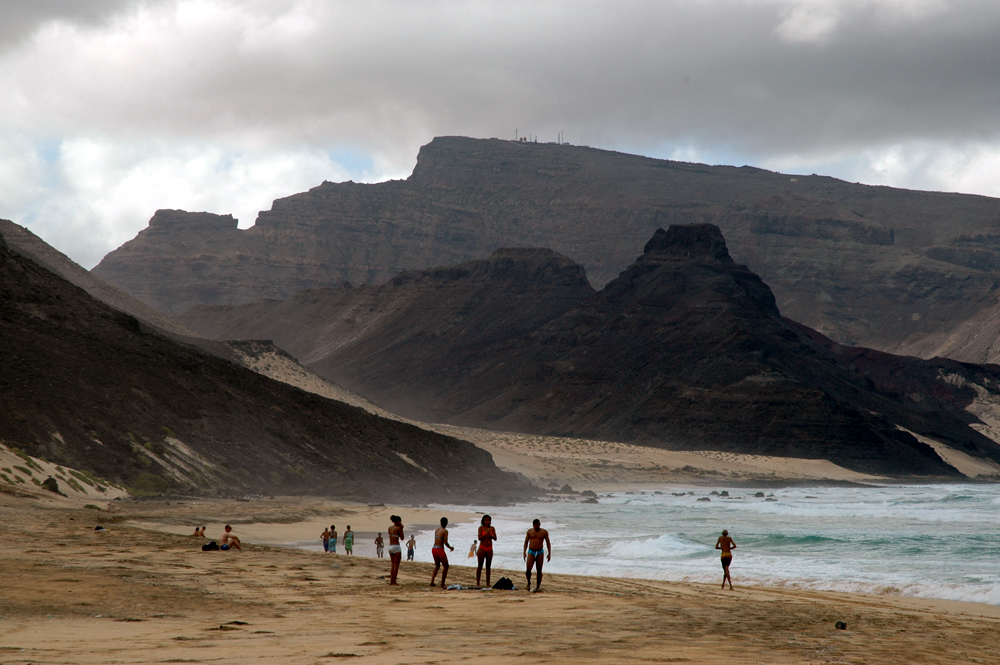
Beach on São Vicente Island.

Cape Verde is a volcanic archipelago situated above an oceanic rise that puts the base of the islands 2 kilometers (1.2 mi) above the rest of the seafloor. Cape Verde has been identified as a hotspot and the majority of geoscientists have argued that the archipelago is underlain by a mantle plume and that this plume is responsible for the volcanic activity and associated geothermal anomalies.

Evidence for a plume origin includes substantial uplift, low-velocity seismic anomalies in the upper mantle extending to depths of around 500 km, low-velocity anomalies in the lower mantle which appear to pond beneath the transition zone with branches extending to the Azores, Canary and Cape Verde hotspots, and petrological, geochemical, and isotopic evidence which are thought to indicate a deep-mantle source.

Some observations, such as a lack of age-progressive volcanism and the geochemical signatures of lavas which indicate a shallow source materials, are inconsistent with the plume model, and some scientists have argued that the Cape Verde Archipelago is a product rather of sub-lithospheric small-scale convection and instabilities arising from heterogeneities in the asthenosphere and variations in lithospheric thickness, with the geochemistry of the lavas attributed to remnants of subcontinental lithospheric mantle left in the oceanic lithosphere when the Atlantic Ocean opened.

The lack of age progression has been accounted for in the hotspot model by the suggestion it is virtually stationary relative to the lithosphere due to being situated close to the rotational pole of the slowly moving African Plate. The unusual geochemical signatures have been ascribed to recycled oceanic crust and lithosphere in the source material.

Though Cape Verde's islands are all volcanic in origin, they vary widely in terrain. A still-active volcano on the island of Fogo is the highest point on the archipelago (elevation 2,829 meters or 9,281 feet). Extensive salt flats are found on Sal and Maio. On Santiago, Santo Antão, and São Nicolau, arid slopes give way in places to sugarcane fields or banana plantations spread along the base of towering mountains.

The islands are geologically principally composed of igneous rocks, with basic volcanics and pyroclastics comprising the majority of the total volume. The volcanic and plutonic rocks are distinctly basic in character. The archipelago is an example of a soda-alkaline petrographic province, with a petrologic succession which is similar to that found in other Mid Atlantic islands. Mount Fogo is an active volcano which most recently erupted in 2014. Fogo's caldera is 8 km (5 mi) in diameter, the rim is at an elevation of 1,600 m (5,249 ft) with an interior cone rising to 2,830 m (9,285 ft) from the crater's floor level. Calderas probably result from the subsidence, following the partial evacuation of the magma chamber, of a cylindrical block into the supplying magma chamber, in this case lying at a depth of some 8 km (5 mi). The archipelago has been dated at approximately 180 million years old.

== See also ==
- Geology of the Canary Islands
- Geology of Madeira
