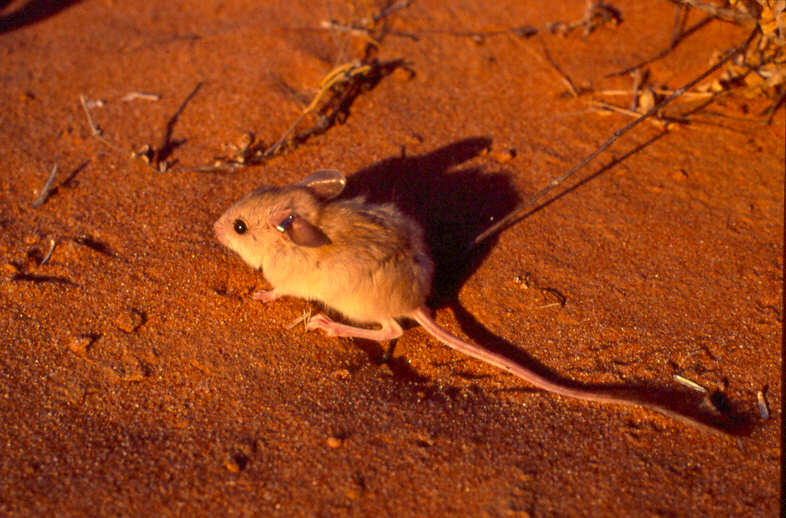
- Dusky hopping mouse (Notomys fuscus)

Scientific classification
- Kingdom: Animalia
- Phylum: Chordata
- Class: Mammalia
- Order: Rodentia
- Family: Muridae
- Tribe: Hydromyini
- Genus: Notomys; Lesson, 1842

Type species
- Dipus mitchelli

Species
- Notomys alexis †Notomys amplus Notomys aquilo Notomys cervinus Notomys fuscus †Notomys longicaudatus †Notomys macrotis †Notomys magnus Notomys mitchellii †Notomys mordax †Notomys robustus

= Hopping mouse =

Hopping mouse Temporal range: Late Pliocene - Recent

Genus of rodents

A hopping mouse is any of about ten different Australian native mice in the genus Notomys. They are rodents, not marsupials, and their ancestors are thought to have arrived from Asia about 5 million years ago.

All are brown or fawn, fading to pale grey or white underneath, have very long tails and, as the common name implies, well-developed hind legs. Half of the hopping mouse species have become extinct since European colonisation. The primary cause is probably predation from introduced foxes or cats, coupled with competition for food from introduced rabbits and hoofed mammals. A hopping mouse's primary diet is seeds. An Australian hopping mouse can concentrate urine to as high as 10,000 mOsm/L (10-20 times higher than a human). This allows it to survive in the desert without drinking water.

== Species ==
- The spinifex hopping mouse (Notomys alexis) occurs throughout the central and western Australian arid zones, occupying both spinifex-covered sand flats and stabilised sand dunes, and loamy mulga and melaleuca flats.
- The extinct short-tailed hopping mouse (Notomys amplus) was the largest species at around 100 g.
- The northern hopping mouse (Notomys aquilo) is found only in coastal northern Australia, from Arnhem Land to the Cobourg Peninsula.
- The fawn hopping mouse (Notomys cervinus) is found on the sparsely vegetated arid gibber plains and claypans of the Lake Eyre Basin. Small at around 30 to 50 g, and light in colour, it is gregarious and feeds at night on seeds, insects, and green shoots, not needing to drink water. It is classed as near threatened.
- Some small dusky hopping mouse (Notomys fuscus) populations retain a slender hold on existence in the Strzelecki Desert. They feed, mostly on seeds, at night and shelter in deep vertical burrows.
- The long-tailed hopping mouse (Notomys longicaudatus) is an extinct species, which was widespread in the drier regions of southern and central Australia. It dug burrows in stiff, clay soils. It liked raisins, but was not a pest to the stores of settlers. Only a handful of specimens were collected and the last record dates from 1901, although skull fragments were found in an owl pellet in 1977.
- The extinct big-eared hopping mouse (Notomys macrotis) lived in the Moore River area of south-western Australia. The last record dates from 19 July 1843.
- Mitchell's hopping mouse (Notomys mitchellii) is the largest extant member of the genus. It occurs throughout much of semi-arid Southern Australia and is currently considered to be unthreatened, although its range has been reduced through habitat disturbance and destruction.
- The Darling Downs hopping mouse (Notomys mordax) is almost certainly extinct and is known only from a single skull collected somewhere on the Darling Downs of south-east Queensland in the 1840s, apparently from a creature similar to Mitchell's hopping-mouse. The introduction of cattle to the Darling Downs has greatly changed the ecology of the region, and seen several other species exterminated or seriously threatened. (See Paradise parrot and Northern hairy-nosed wombat.)
- The great hopping mouse (Notomys robustus Mahoney, Smith and Medlin 2008) is extinct. It is known only from skulls found in owl pellets in the Flinders Ranges. Some pellets also include bones of the introduced house mouse—indicating that it survived into historic times, possibly the second half of the 19th century. From the skull, it appears to have been relatively large (perhaps the size of N. amplus or a little more) and to have escaped collection by early 19th century naturalists by chance. From the location of the deposits it is assumed that it preferred clay rather than sandy soils. It is notable that very few of the clay-living hopping mice have survived European settlement, sand dunes apparently providing a more secure refuge from competitors and predators. Also commonly known as the broad-cheeked hopping-mouse.
- Notomys magnus one of the largest species of the genus, with an estimated body mass of 86 grams. Native to northeast Australia, it is only known from subfossil bones, but it is suspected to have gone extinct after European arrival.

== See also ==
- Jerboa - a similar dipodid rodent native to northern Africa and Asia; an example of parallel evolution
- Jumping mouse - a non-desert-dwelling dipodid rodent native to China and North America
- Kangaroo mouse and kangaroo rat - similar heteromyid rodents of North America
- Kultarr - an unrelated marsupial with a similar body plan and coloration; an example of convergence
- Springhare - a similar pedetid rodent native to southern and eastern Africa
