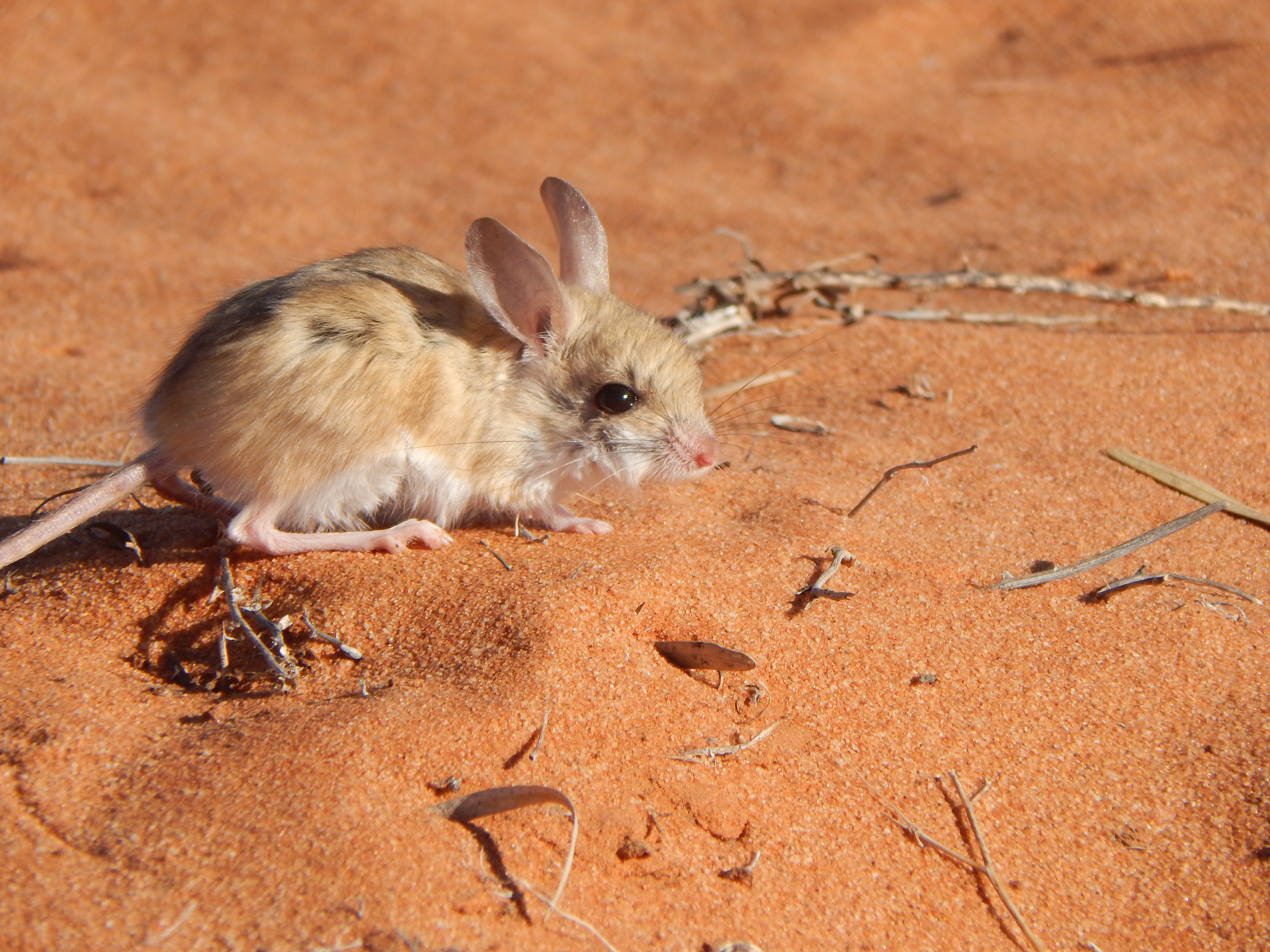
- Dusky hopping mouse (Notomys fuscus)

Conservation status
- Near Threatened (IUCN 3.1)

Scientific classification
- Kingdom: Animalia
- Phylum: Chordata
- Class: Mammalia
- Order: Rodentia
- Family: Muridae
- Genus: Notomys
- Species: N. fuscus

Binomial name
- Notomys fuscus Jones, 1925
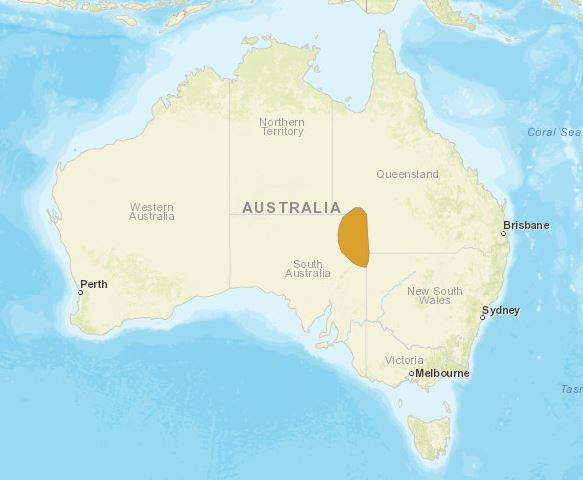
- Current distribution of the dusky hopping mouse (Notomys fuscus)

= Dusky hopping mouse =

Species of rodent

The dusky hopping mouse (Notomys fuscus), is a small rodent endemic to Australia, inhabiting desert regions characterised by sand dunes. Populations have experienced significant declines since the arrival of Europeans, and continue to be subject to threatening processes. It is currently listed as a near-threatened species.

== Taxonomy ==
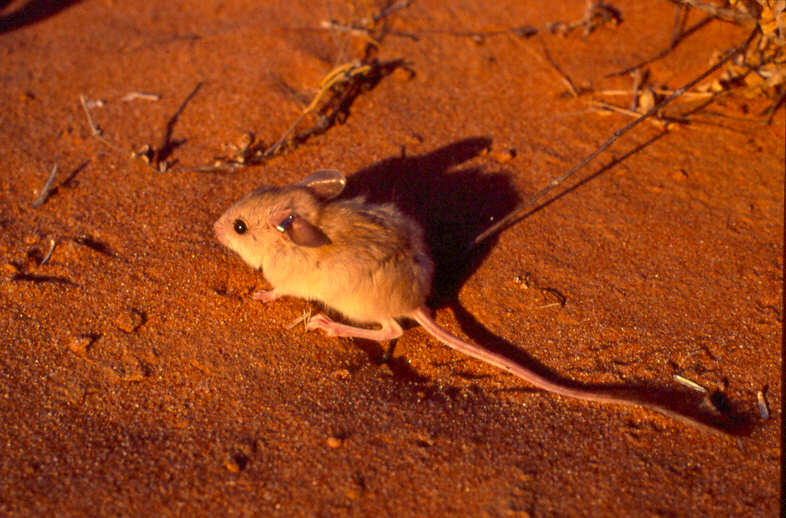
Adult dusky hopping mouse (Notomys fuscus)

The dusky hopping mouse, or Wilkinti, is a mammal in the order Rodentia, and suborder Sciurognathi. The species is in the family Muridae and the subfamily Murinae (includes all Australian native rats and mice). The dusky hopping mouse belongs to the genus Notomys, a group of desert-dwelling rodents.

The species was originally described as Ascopharynx fuscus (Wood Jones 1925) from a specimen collected in South Australia. Subsequent collections were described as Notomys fuscus eyreius in 1960. Hopping mice collected in Queensland between 1957 and 1959 were described as a new species, Notomys filmeri, however, later taxonomic investigation revealed these were Notomys fuscus.

== Description ==
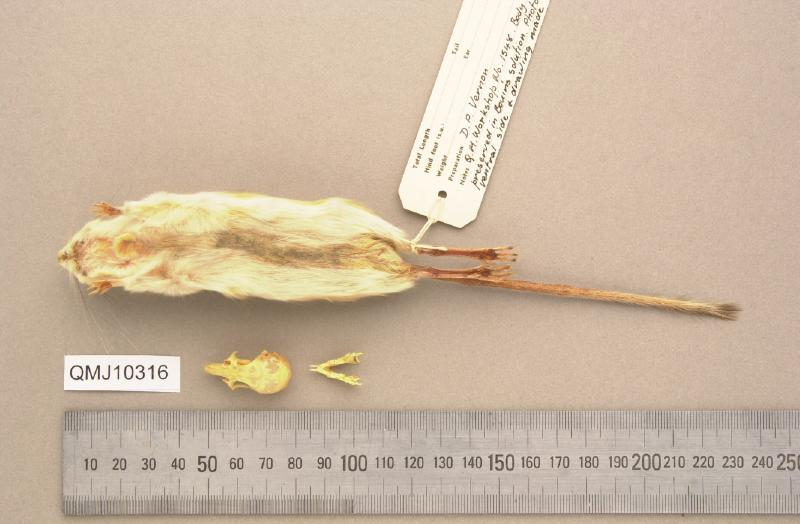
Specimen of dusky hopping mouse (Notomys fuscus), showing throat pouch

The dusky hopping mouse has pale orange-brown upper parts, occasionally with grey tinged streaks. The under parts are grey-white. It grows to 80–115 mm long, with an average weight of 35 g. The tail is between 120 and 155 mm long, ending in a tuft of dark hairs. They have a well-developed throat pouch, with an opening surrounded by a fleshy margin with inward pointing, coarse white hairs. Its ears are large and furless for dissipating heat, and they have prominent dark eyes, and strong incisor teeth. It has short front legs, and long, elongated hind feet. with only three pads on the sole. Male reproductive anatomy is distinctive. The glans is small and tapered towards the tip. The surface has large dorsally projecting spines, with slightly curved tips. The testes are extremely small compared to other native rodents. Females have two pairs of inguinal teats.

== Distribution ==
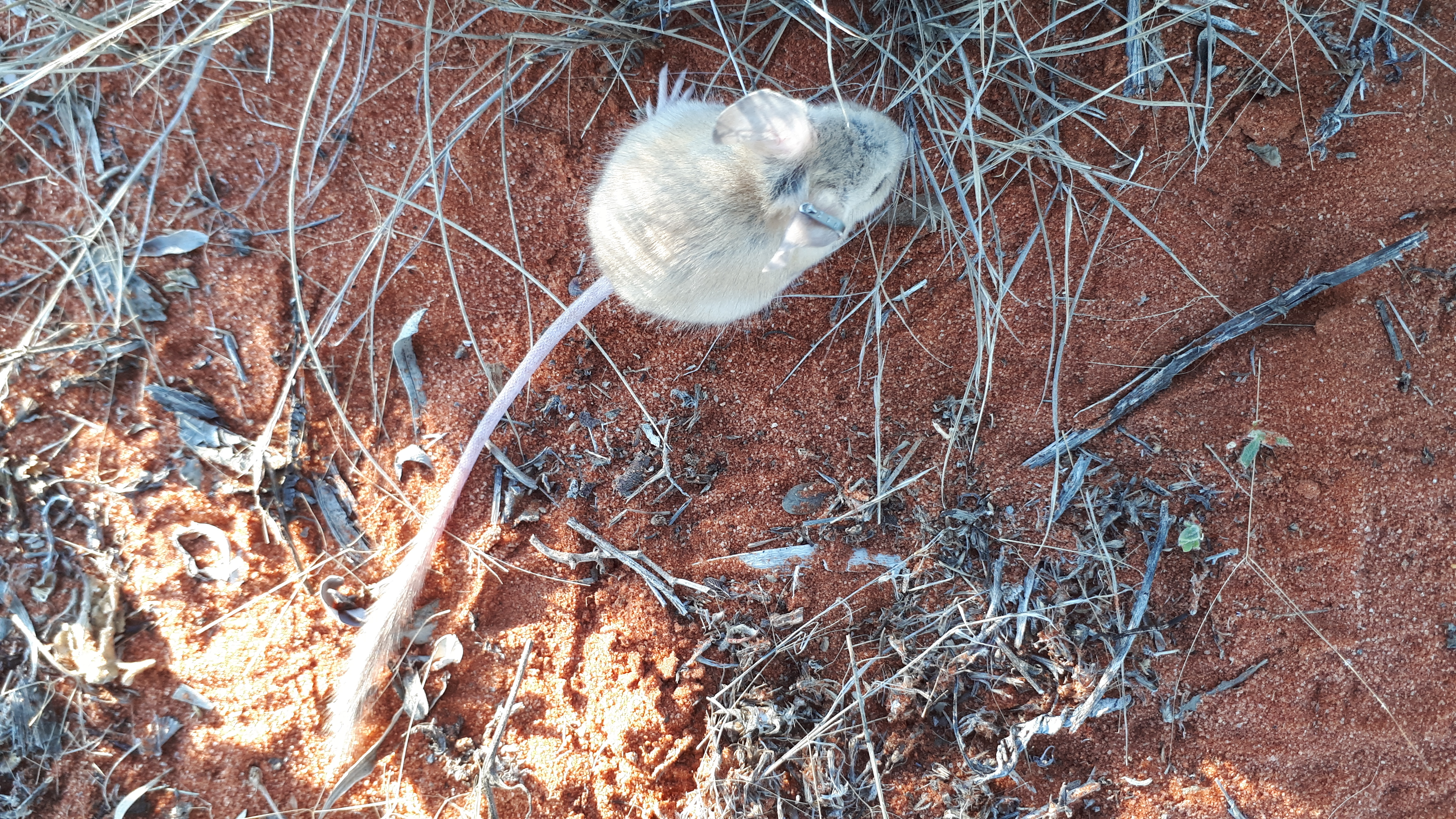
Sub-adult dusky hopping mouse (Notomys fuscus)

The species historically inhabited large areas of central Australia, south-west Queensland, and far west South Australia, and Western Australia. Sub-fossil specimens were found in far-south South Australia, near the Flinders Ranges. Populations were recorded in the Northern Territory, however have not been observed since 1939. Distribution has shown a marked decline of more than 90% since the arrival of Europeans, with populations now patchy and highly fragmented. It is currently thought to be restricted to the Cobblers Sandhills and Strzelecki Desert in north-east South Australia, south-west Queensland and far north-west New South Wales. The species was presumed to be extinct in New South Wales, before being re-discovered in Sturt National Park in 2003. Since then, a number of sightings have been recorded near Broken Hill, New South Wales.

== Ecology ==
=== Habitat ===
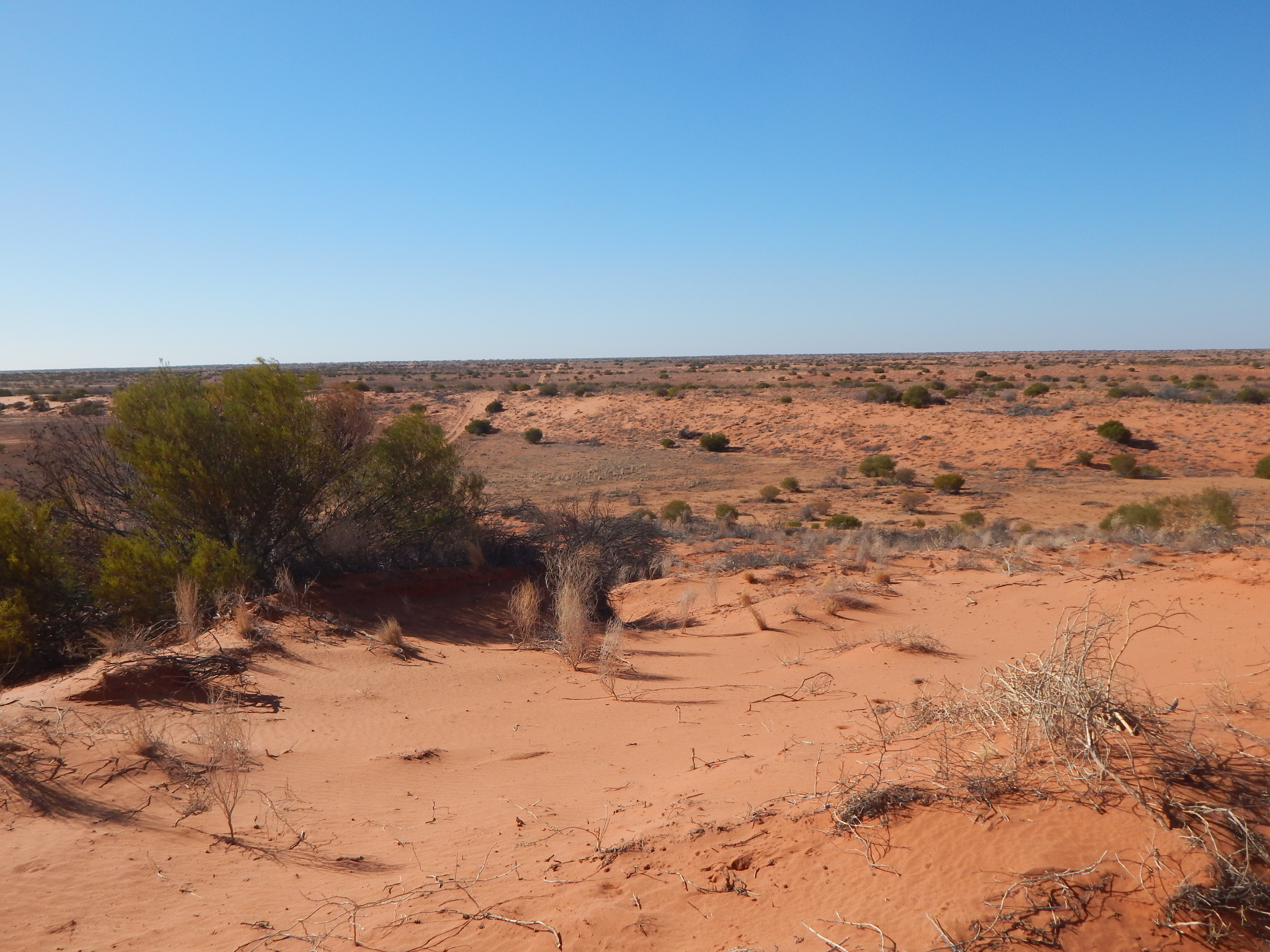
The Strzelecki Desert, contains habitats preferred by the dusky hopping mouse (Notomys fuscus)

The preferred habitat of the dusky hopping mouse is the crests and slopes of stabilised desert sand dunes and ridges, with sand required for digging burrows. Dense populations tend to occur only within the vicinity of major drainage systems. It does not appear to favour a particular vegetation type, occurring in dunes well-vegetated by canegrass (Zygochloa paradoxa), as well as degraded ecosystems dominated by ephemeral herbaceous species. It has also been associated with perennial shrub species such as nitre bush (Nitraria billardierei) and Acacia species.

=== Behaviour ===
The dusky hopping mouse is a social species, living in colonies of up to five individuals. They live in burrows consisting of vertical shafts with a series of entrances approximately 3 cm in diameter, leading to a network of horizontal tunnels and chambers extending up to 2m deep. Notomys species dig their burrows from below, resulting in an absence of loose sand surrounding the entrance holes. This species prefers to forage at night in sheltered microhabitats, rather than open areas, to avoid the risk of predation. It is an opportunistic, omnivorous feeder, however is considered a granivore (74% of the diet). Green plant material, insects, and fruits are also eaten. It does not need to drink water. The neck throat pouch is a glandular area, used for marking territories. Females may scent-mark their young, ensuring they acquire a smell that grants them acceptance within the colony.

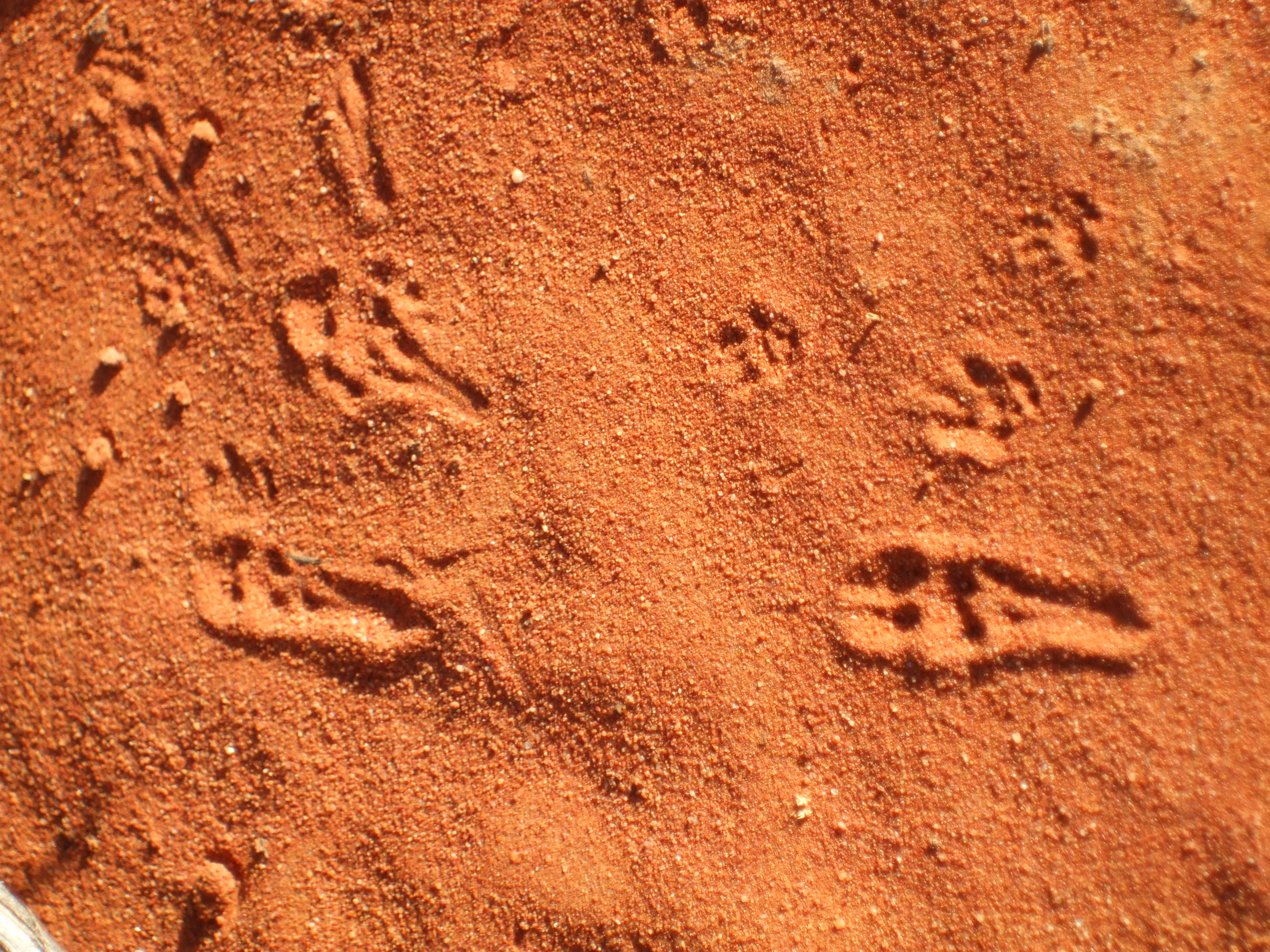
Dusky hopping mouse (Notomys fuscus) tracks in the sand

=== Life cycle and reproduction ===
In the wild, lifespan has been recorded as being up to 13 months of age. In captivity, males and females reach reproductive maturity at 70 days of age. This species is likely monogamous, and females may display selectivity in choosing which males will sire offspring. Breeding is non-seasonal, occurring year-round, in both wet and dry conditions. Females are observed to be polyoestrous, with a gestation period of 32 to 38 days, and a litter size of one to five offspring. An average of 42 days occurs between litters, and the maximum reproductive life for females is approximately 24 months, and males 36 months. Subpopulations may persist at low but stable numbers, however others exhibit "boom-and-bust" variation, with numbers increasing and decreasing rapidly in response to rainfall and resource availability.

=== Dispersal and movement ===
When travelling slowly, hopping mice move on all fours, however they hop on the hind feet when travelling at speed. Individuals can disperse over large distances to colonise isolated habitats, crossing areas of hard unsuitable substrate. Foraging distances are up to 400m per night, extending up to 1.5 km over three nights. Individuals inhabiting degraded habitats with limited vegetation and food resources show lower mobility, whereas those inhabiting highly diverse habitats with a wide variety of resources have wider ranging movement patterns.

== Threats ==
=== Predation ===
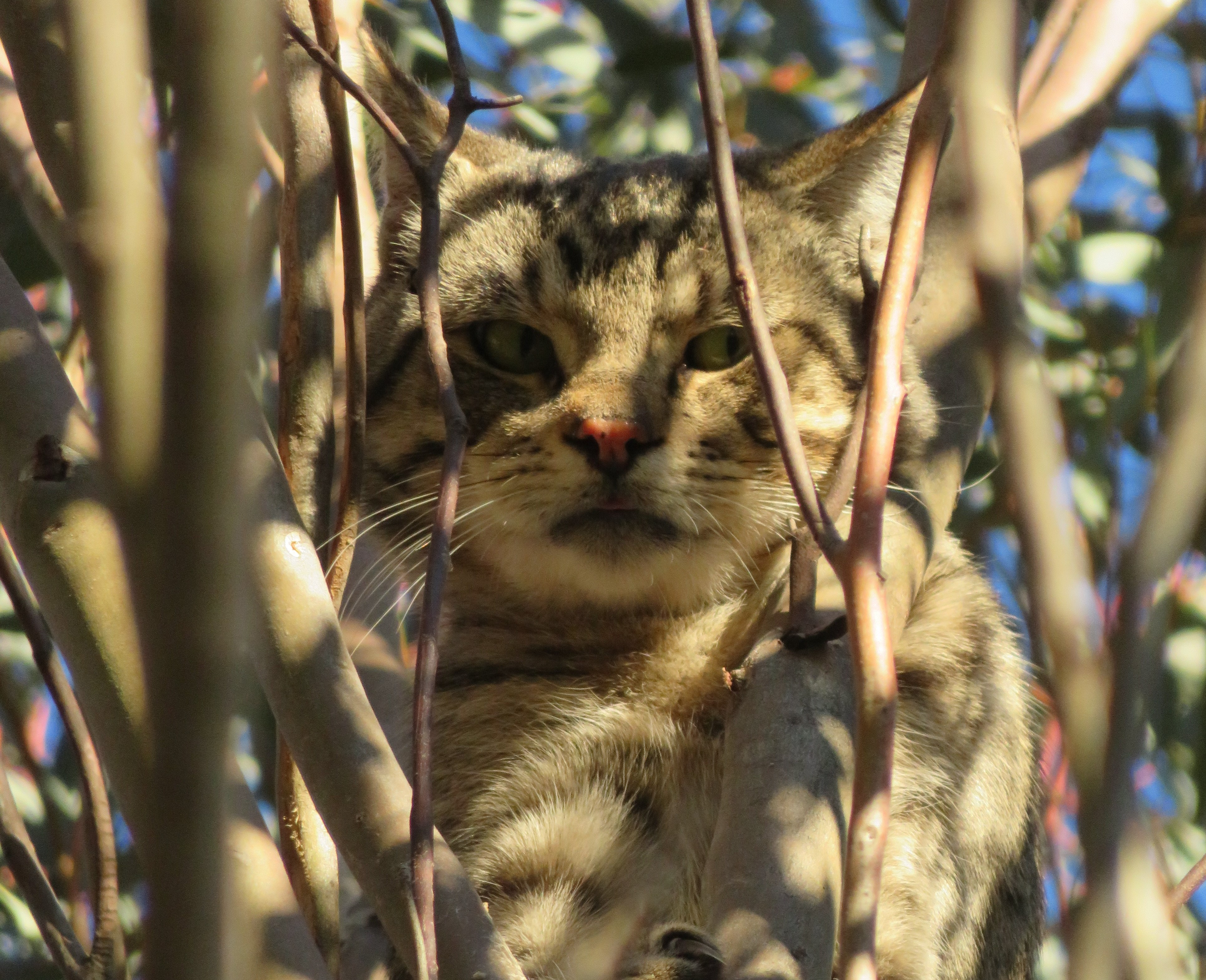
Feral cats (Felis catus) target small mammals as prey, such as native rodents

Introduced predators such as the red fox (Vulpes vulpes) and feral cat (Felis catus) have detrimental impacts on dusky hopping mouse populations. Where cat and fox abundance is high, dusky hopping mouse populations decline. Cats target smaller prey such as rodents, which can make up a large proportion of their diet. Native species, such as the eastern barn owl (Tyto javanica), frequently consume this species, as does the dingo. Dingoes may de-populate localised populations of hopping mice within months, particularly under drought conditions. Crest-tailed mulgara (Dasycercus cristicauda) have also been recorded eating this species.

=== Habitat degradation ===
Livestock, kangaroos and rabbits overgraze vegetation required for shelter and food sources, leading to scalding, wind and sheet erosion and a shift from perennial, to less productive ephemeral plant species. Livestock also damage habitats by trampling. Reduced food availability limits hopping mice abundance, and the availability of suitable habitat limits their distribution. However, higher annual rainfall and more productive ecosystems may buffer the effects of livestock, by providing more dependable and abundant resources, allowing mice to proliferate.

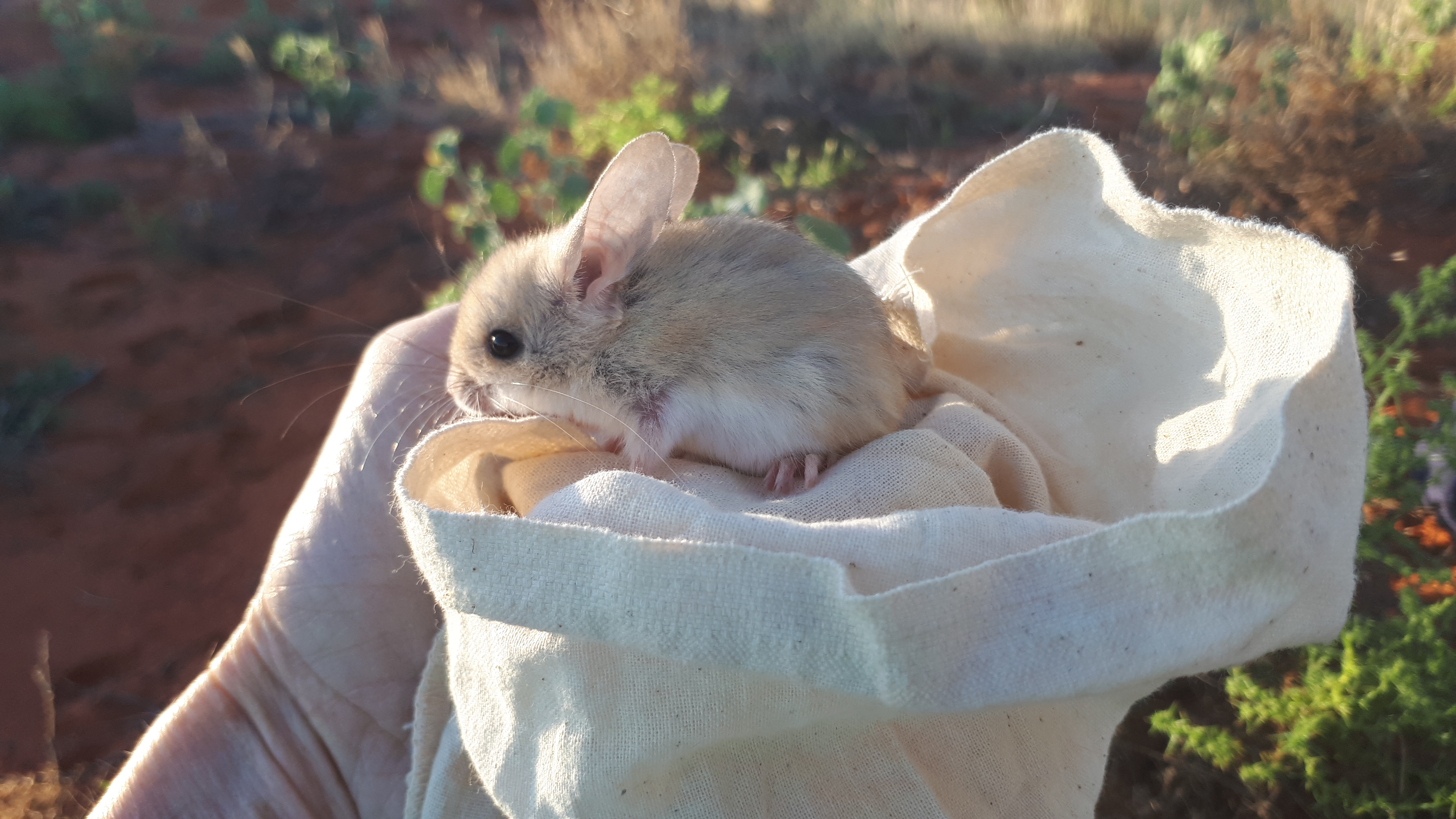
Sub-adult Dusky Hopping Mouse (Notomys fuscus)

=== Competition ===
Competition for food and habitat occurs with the house mouse (Mus musculus), which increase in abundance more rapidly under favourable conditions, depleting resources and outcompeting the native mice. The rabbit (Oryctolagus cuniculus) also competes with dusky hopping mice for food. Declines in rabbit abundance, and increased resources, following the release of the Rabbit Haemorrhagic Disease Virus (RHDV) in Australia in 1995, saw the dusky hopping mouse increased their extent of occurrence by 241 to 365% over 14 years.

=== Climate Change ===
This species experiences natural population declines during dry periods, when food resources are limited, and increase strongly following rainfall events. Decreases in rainfall, less frequent rainfall events and more frequent droughts under climate change may cause declines or extinctions. Predation of hopping mice by dingoes intensifies under drought conditions, which may significantly impact populations.

== Conservation status ==
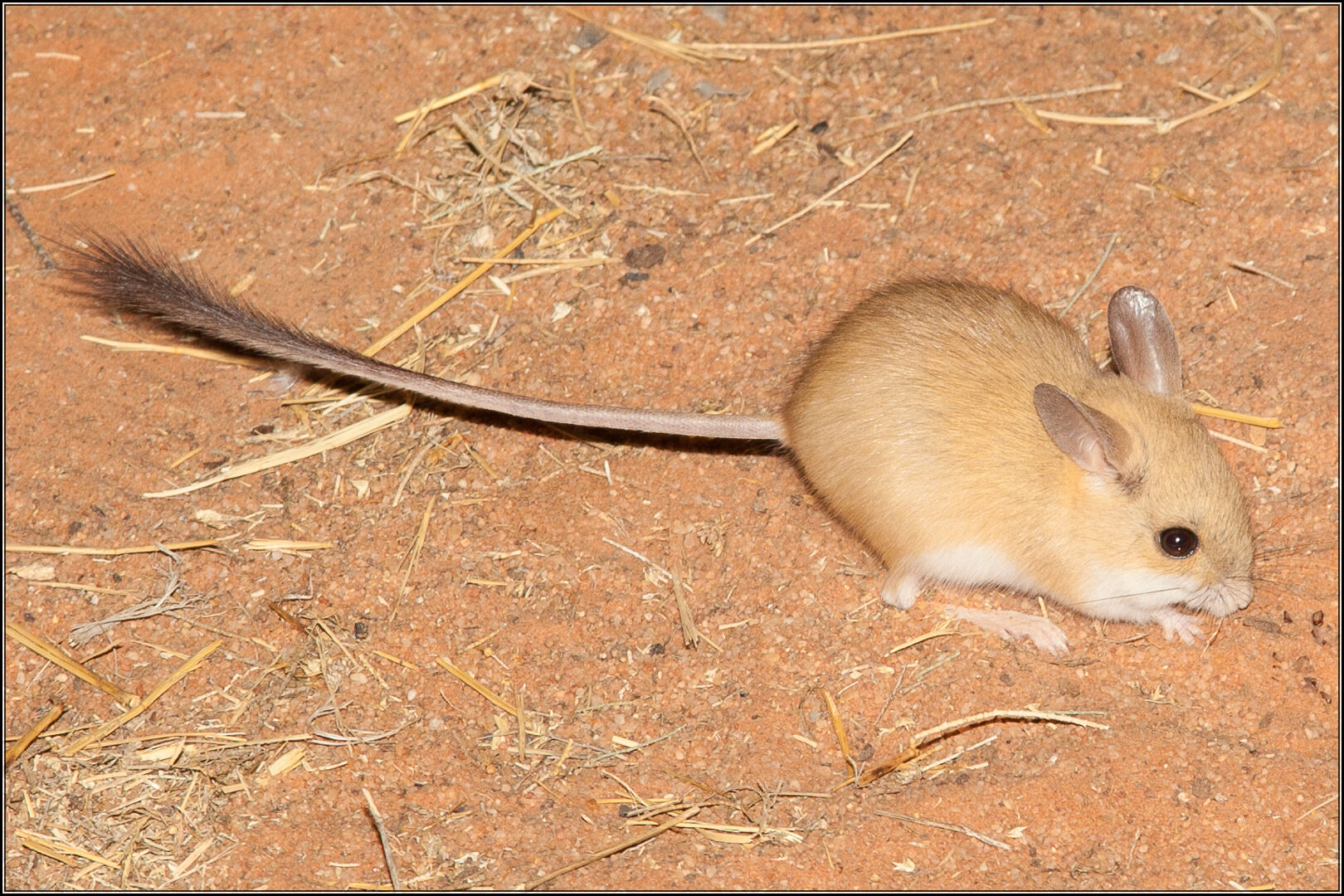
Dusky hopping mouse (Notomys fuscus) in the Strzelecki Desert

The total remaining population is estimated to be between 2,500 and 10,000 individuals.

- International Union for the Conservation of Nature (IUCN) Red List: Vulnerable
- Australia: Vulnerable (Environment Protection and Biodiversity Conservation Act 1999)
- New South Wales: Endangered (Biodiversity Conservation Act 2016 No 63)
- South Australia: Vulnerable (National Parks and Wildlife Act 1972)
- Queensland: Endangered (Nature Conservation Act 1992)
- Northern Territory: Endangered (Territory Parks and Wildlife Conservation Act 2000)
