= Geology of Madeira =

Madeira began to form more than 100 million years ago in the Early Cretaceous, although most of the island has formed in the last 66 million years of the Cenozoic, particularly in the Miocene and Pliocene. The island is an example of hotspot volcanism, with mainly mafic volcanic and igneous rocks, together with smaller deposits of limestone, lignite and other sediments that record its long-running uplift.

Distribution of the islands of the archipelago (not including the Savage Islands)

== Stratigraphy, tectonics and geologic history ==
During the Early Cretaceous, massive sedimentation offshore of Africa built up enough stress on the crust to prompt fissuring and fracturing. Magma ascended to the surface and submarine eruptions began. By the Late Oligocene or Early Miocene, successive undersea eruptions throughout the early Cenozoic had built up enough material for the Madeira archipelago to appear above sea level. The rapid uplift of the island is recorded with offshore limestone deposits, leftover from coral reefs as well as onshore limestone up to 400 meters above sea level.

The high altitude limestones are associated with the Vindobonian Volcanic Complex, which includes trachyte, diabase and dolerite intrusions, along with pyroclastic flow sediments.

Basalt is the most common rock type on Madeira and geologists have found a variety of different types including alkali-basalt, basanite and hawaiite.

=== Miocene-Pliocene (23-2.5 million years ago) ===
Madeira alternated between slow lava flows and violent eruptions, as reefs formed around the edge of the island. Plants flourished on the island and plant fossils along with low-grade lignite coal formed in the Paul da Serra Beds, which are covered in basalt. The addition of this material in the Miocene stressed the crust, causing down buckling of the volcano. In the Pliocene, trachyte lava and tuff formed 600 meter thick sequences, while 400 meter thick basalt plateaus developed.

Breccia, agglomerate and conglomerate beneath the basalt suggest rapid deposition due to torrential downpours quickly eroding the slope of the volcano, while the lignite indicates poorly drained, swampy depressions. Eroded sediments in the Miocene and early part of the Pliocene formed laterite, soil enriched in iron and aluminum due to the leaching away of silicate material by rainfall.

=== Quaternary (2.5 million years ago-present) ===
During the Quaternary, small marine transgression episodes flooded flat coastal areas. Freshwater lakes formed in depressions. When they dried out, lake bed sediments were shifted around by wind. Biodetrital sand, leftover from shell debris, is found along the coast of Madeira, in places where the sea level subsequently retreated. In fact, uplift of the island combined with changes in sea level related to the end of the Pleistocene ice ages means that some Quaternary marine terraces are as much as 100 meters above sea level.

== Hydrogeology and soils ==
Groundwater on Madeira is held in fractured volcanic rock aquifers, with widely varying transmissivity and dissolved mineral content. Water is generally slightly acidic to slightly alkaline and cold, although there are small quantities of thermal water near fault zones. Much of the water on the island comes from high-discharge springs.

Leptosols, cambisols and andisols are the three main soil types on the island.

== Natural resource geology ==
Madeira has few natural resources and no mining, aside from small-scale extraction of sand and gravel for building material.

== See also ==
- Geology of the Canary Islands
- Geology of Cape Verde
