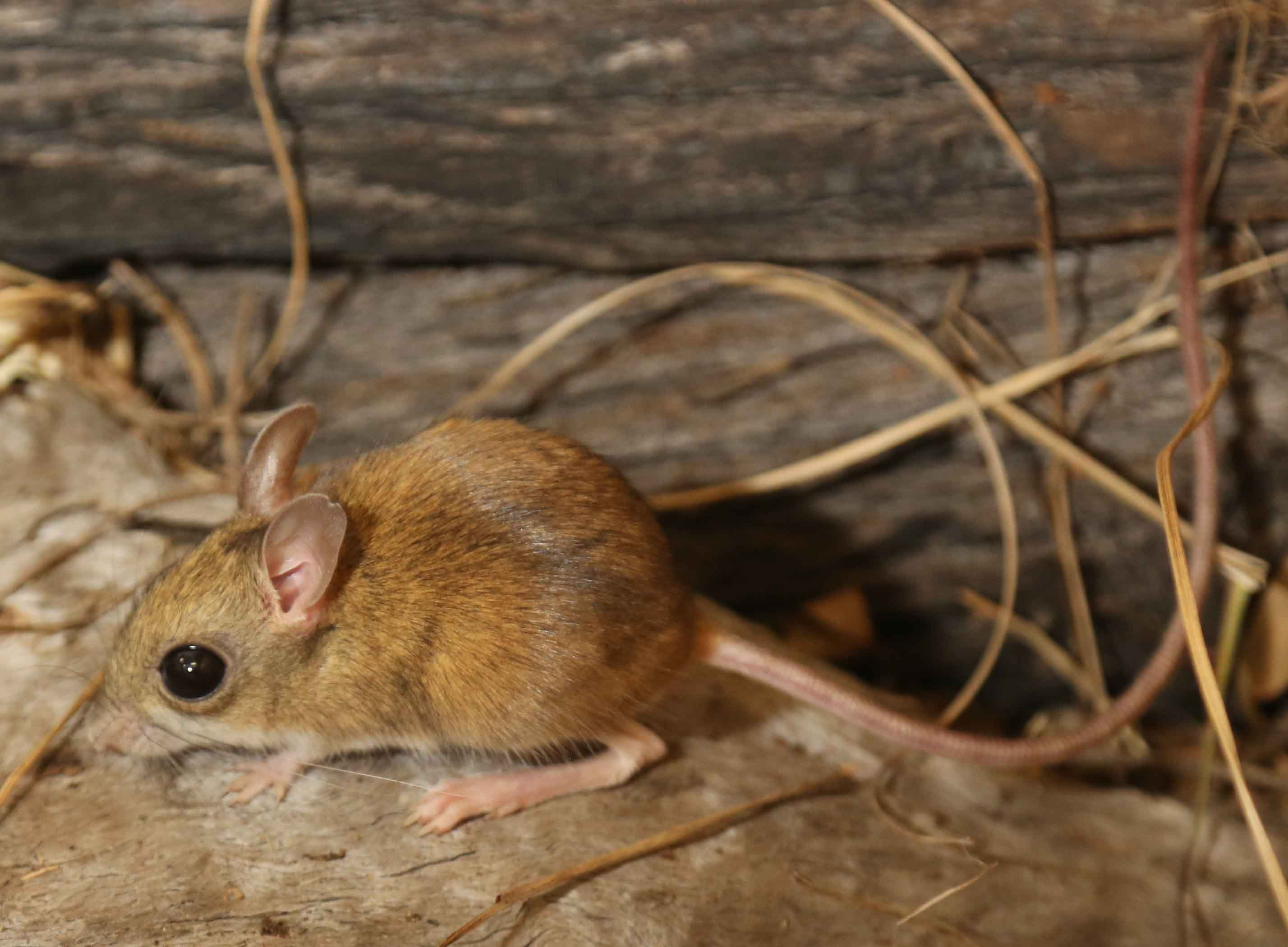
- N. aquilo at Wurruwarrkbadenumanja, Groote Eylandt

Conservation status
- Endangered (IUCN 3.1)

Scientific classification
- Kingdom: Animalia
- Phylum: Chordata
- Class: Mammalia
- Infraclass: Placentalia
- Order: Rodentia
- Family: Muridae
- Genus: Notomys
- Species: N. aquilo

Binomial name
- Notomys aquilo Thomas, 1921

= Northern hopping mouse =

Species of rodent

The northern hopping mouse (Notomys aquilo) is a species of rodent in the family Muridae. It is also known as woorrentinta, from Lardil, the language of Mornington Island.

It is found only in coastal northern Australia, from Arnhem Land to the Cobourg Peninsula in the Northern Territory of Australia. The only known population is in the Anindilyakwa Indigenous Protected Area on Groote Eylandt. There have two former sightings in inland central Arnhem Land and in Cape York in Queensland 120 years ago, both single recordings. Its population has not been yet been determined. It is classified as vulnerable.

The mouse weighs 25 to 50 grams and is brown above and white below. Its long tail measures 150% of its body length and it has long hind feet up to 4 centimeters long.

This species lives in sandy soils on heathlands and grasslands. It is nocturnal. It consumes seeds and sometimes other plant material and invertebrates.The mouse hops, leaving bipedal tracks. The females are known to construct elaborate communal burrow systems.

Threats to this species include habitat alteration, such as changes in the fire regime and the effects of livestock. Feral cats watch the burrows and may consume several individuals in a night.

A national recovery plan for the Northern Hopping-mouse was prepared in 2004. It is highly elusive and 'trap-shy'. Recent surveys have been undertaken using camera traps and radio-tracking.
