= Great hopping mouse =

Conservation status
- Extinct (EPBC Act)

Scientific classification
- Domain: Eukaryota
- Kingdom: Animalia
- Phylum: Chordata
- Class: Mammalia
- Order: Rodentia
- Family: Muridae
- Genus: Notomys
- Species: †N. robustus

Binomial name
- †Notomys robustus Mahoney, Smith and Medlin, 2008

Species of rodent

The great hopping mouse (Notomys robustus) is an extinct species of mammal native to Australia. It is known only from skulls found in owl pellets in the Flinders Ranges. Some pellets also include bones of the introduced house mouse—indicating that it survived into historic times, possibly the second half of the 19th century. From the skull, it appears to have been relatively large (perhaps the size of N. amplus or a little more) and to have escaped collection by early 19th century naturalists by chance. From the location of the deposits it is assumed that it preferred clay rather than sandy soils. It is also commonly known as the broad-cheeked hopping mouse.
