= Petrographic province =

Geological region

A petrographic province is a geological region within which the igneous rocks reveal a relationship (so-called consanguinity) in chemical composition, which may be referred to a community of origin. This relationship may be chemically a close one, but the rocks have widely varying mineralogical composition, or the kinship may be restricted to one or more of the chemical components in the rocks.

== Etymology ==
Petrography derives from petra (Greek: πέτρα), meaning 'rock', and graphein (Greek: γράφειν), 'to write'.
