= Hyperpredation =

Greater predation from new prey introduction

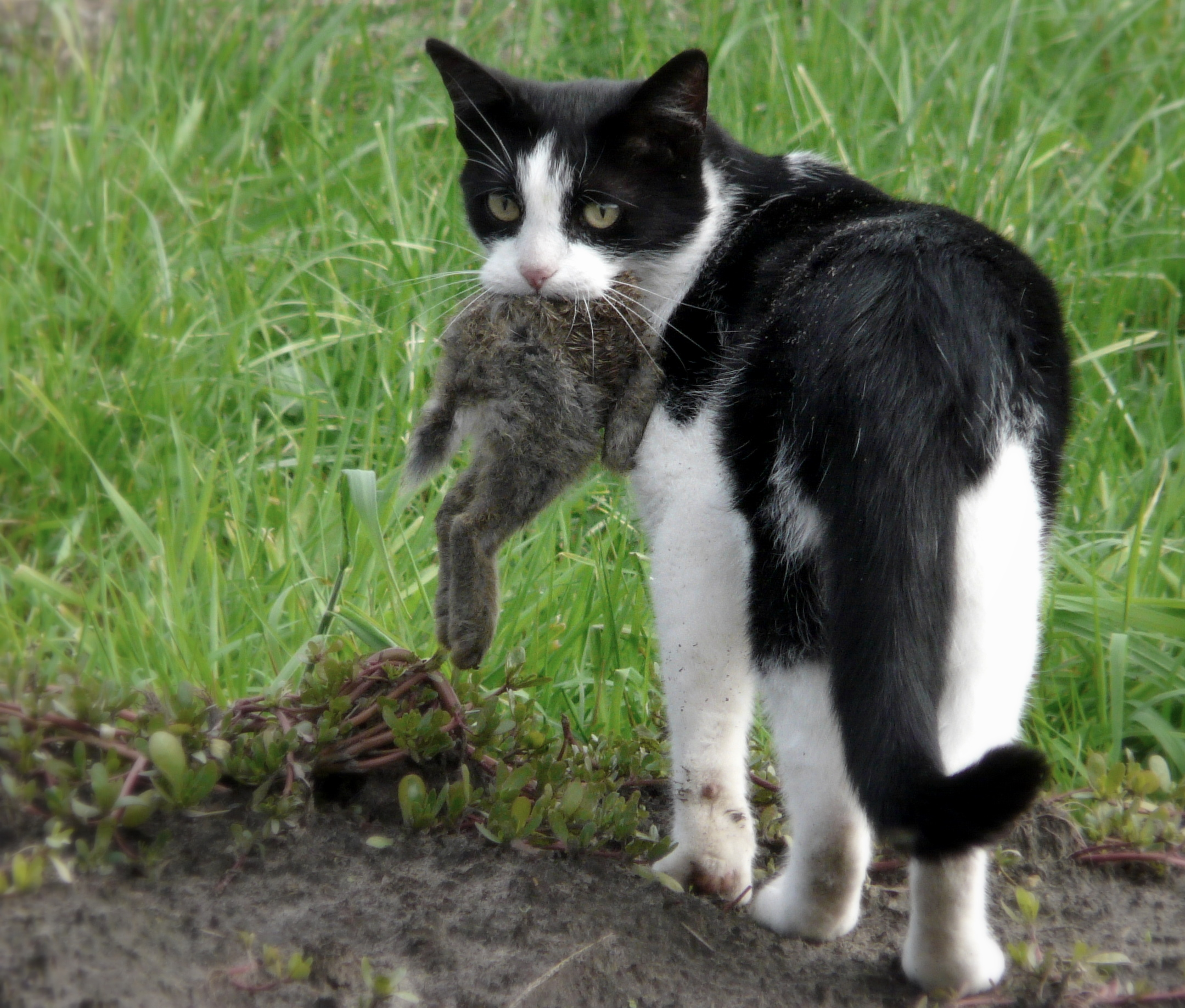
Hyperpredation has been recorded in an ecosystem involving a bird (native prey), a cat (alien predator), and a rabbit (alien prey)

Hyperpredation is a response to new prey by a generalist predator who increases its predation pressure. Predators that lost more energy hunting certain prey than what they gained through feeding have gone extinct in extreme cases. Introduced Eastern cottontails cause an apparent competition with the European hare, as a result this along with the red fox being their main predator causes hyperpredation.

== Examples ==
After the invasion of feral pigs, golden eagles began preying heavily on the alien species. Another prey on the islands, the Island fox, nearly went locally extinct due to the predation pressure from the golden eagles. These incidents happened in the California Channel Islands.

== See also ==
- Predator
- Carnivore
- Mesopredator
- Mutualism (biology)
- Interspecific competition
- Surplus killing
