= Spinifex hopping mouse =

Conservation status
- Least Concern (IUCN 3.1)

Scientific classification
- Kingdom: Animalia
- Phylum: Chordata
- Class: Mammalia
- Order: Rodentia
- Family: Muridae
- Genus: Notomys
- Species: N. alexis

Binomial name
- Notomys alexis Thomas, 1922

Species of rodent

The spinifex hopping mouse (Notomys alexis), also known as the tarkawara or tarrkawarra, occurs throughout the central and western Australian arid zones, occupying both spinifex-covered sand flats and stabilised sand dunes, and loamy mulga and melaleuca flats.

The population fluctuates greatly: in normal years it is sparsely distributed and probably confined to sandy country; after rain the population explodes and spreads to other types of habitat for a time.

They are mostly seen at night, bounding across open ground on their large hind feet, with tails extended and the body almost horizontal.

As semi-fossorial, burrowing surface foragers, the tiny hopping mice spend a great deal of energy not just foraging for food, but also transporting it back to their burrows. In fact, it was found that the total energy spent on transporting food in relation to energy investment on burrows far outweighed any other similar type of species.

== Appearance ==
The appearance is very similar to the northern hopping mouse: slightly larger than a common house mouse at 95 to 115 mm (3.7 to 4.5 in) head-body length and an average weight of 35 g (1.2 oz). As with all hopping mice, the hind legs are greatly elongated, the fore limbs small, and the brush-tipped tail very long—about 140 mm (5.5 in). The fur is chestnut or fawn above, pale below, with a grey wash about the muzzle and between the eye and ear, and longer, coarse black guard hairs on the back. The tail is sparsely furred and pink, darker above than below.

Spinifex hopping mice live in small family groups of up to 10 individuals in deep, humid burrow systems. Typically, there is a large nest chamber lined with small sticks and other plant material about a metre below the surface, from which several vertical shafts lead upwards. Shaft entrances do not have spoil heaps.

== Breeding ==
Breeding can be at any time of year depending on conditions, Pregnancy usually takes 38–41 days but can be prolonged significantly if the mother is still suckling the previous brood. Litters of three or four are typical, six being the maximum. The young remain in the nest while the female forages; if they wander both male and female adults retrieve them. They reach sexual maturity in about two and a half months. After mating, a copulatory plug is formed in the female's reproductive tract.

The spinifex hopping mouse is widespread and although the population fluctuates considerably, is not considered at risk.

== As pets ==
Previously, spinifex hopping mice could be kept as pets in Victoria (Australia), but a Basic Wildlife Licence was required. In 2013, Victorian regulations for the possession, use and trade of wildlife underwent a number of changes and as part of these reforms spinifex hopping mice were moved to Schedule 4B, which allows private ownership without a licence. Commercial breeding still requires a licence to prevent removal of mice from the wild. Pet owners should be aware of the potential parasite and disease risks, including mites and helminths, and in very rare cases even melanoma.

Captive populations of spinifex hopping mice are useful for small scale research, and can be used for developing management tools to assess the health status of those in captivity.
