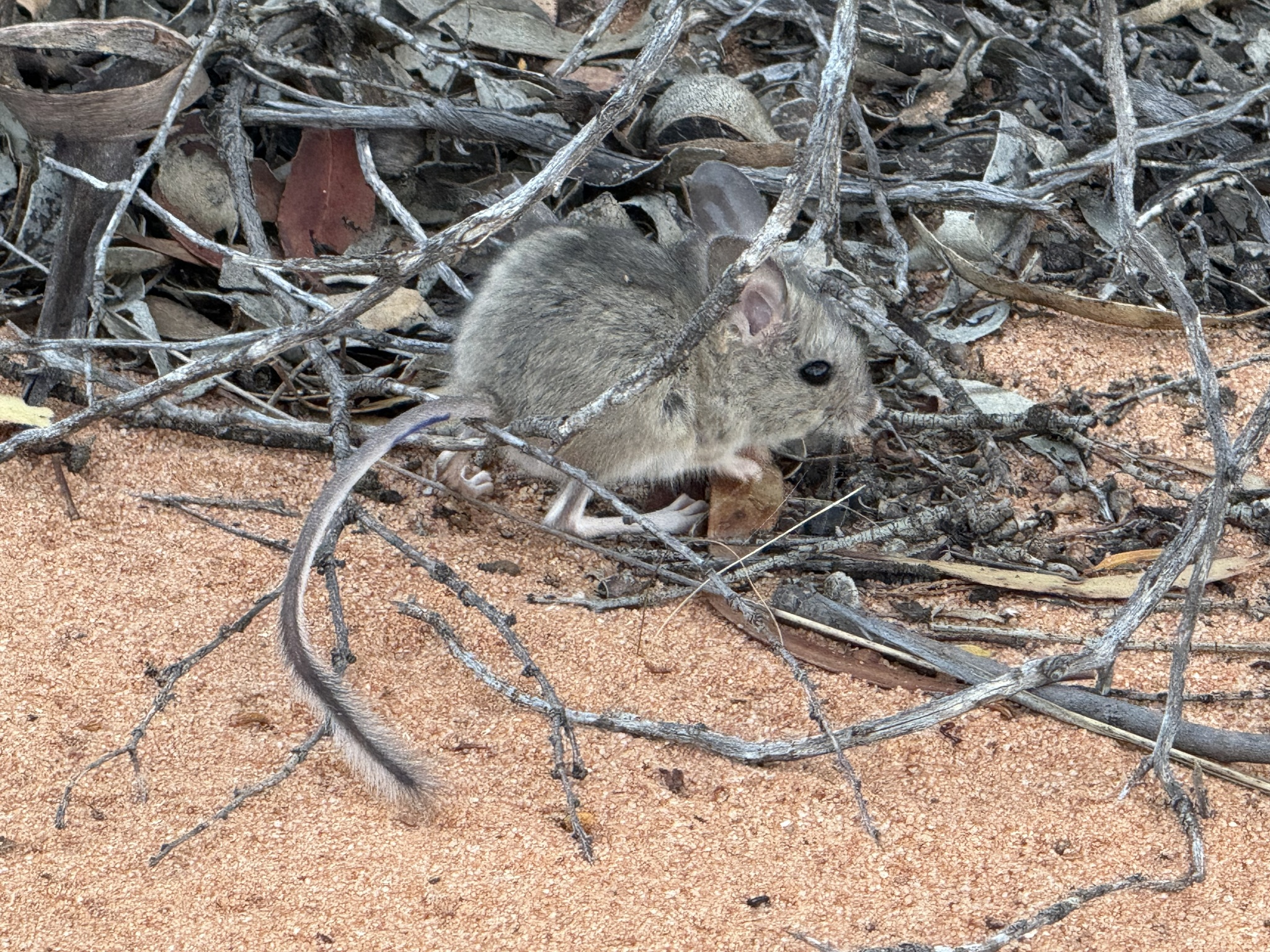

Conservation status
- Least Concern (IUCN 3.1)

Scientific classification
- Kingdom: Animalia
- Phylum: Chordata
- Class: Mammalia
- Order: Rodentia
- Family: Muridae
- Genus: Notomys
- Species: N. mitchellii

Binomial name
- Notomys mitchellii (Ogilby, 1838)

= Mitchell's hopping mouse =

Species of rodent

Mitchell's hopping mouse (Notomys mitchellii) also known as the pankot, is the largest extant member of the genus Notomys, weighing between 40 and 60 g (1.4 and 2.1 oz). N. mitchellii is a bipedal rodent with large back legs, similar to a jerboa or kangaroo rat. The species occurs throughout much of semi-arid Southern Australia, and appears to be particularly common on the Eyre Peninsula, South Australia. Typical habitat for N. mitchellii appears to be mallee shrublands on sandy dune systems. The species is currently considered to be unthreatened, but its range has been reduced through habitat disturbance and destruction associated with European settlement in Australia.

Individuals are a sandy grey colour, with white chest hairs and a paler underbelly. The tail of the species is long and has the characteristic hopping mouse brush at the tip. This tail morphology is thought to aid balance when travelling at speed. Being nocturnal, Notomys mitchellii shelters during the day in typical hopping mouse burrows; a small number of interconnected, vertical shafts, burrowing deep into the dune. Up to eight animals, different ages and sex, have been found in a single burrow.

Notomys mitchellii is known to have a lifespan of up to five years in the laboratory and this is thought to be a strategy evolved to combat the breeding-constraints of lengthy periods of drought. It has also been found that this species is less able to cope with water deprivation than other species of the genus. Notomys mitchellii produces concentrated urine to conserve water, but in a different way to more arid-dwelling rodents. The diet of N. mitchellii is also thought to consist of more roots and green matter than that of other species of the genus: animals captured in drought conditions had stomach contents consisting of some 85% roots, 11% green leaf and 4% seed.

== As a pet ==
A 2010 report by the Australian Government Rural Industries Research and Development Corporation into the feasibility of keeping Australian native mammals as pets concluded that "Mitchell's hopping mouse is a suitable species for widespread keeping as a pet." As of 2010, this would require changes to legislation or policy in most Australian states and territories. As of late 2013, Mitchell's hopping mice can be kept as pets without a licence in Victoria (Australia), however commercial breeding still requires a licence to prevent removal of mice from the wild.

Victorian Wildlife Regulations 2013 - Schedule 4B Species are commonly kept by large numbers of the general public. Husbandry techniques are simple and well established. A license is required to obtain and, sell these species for commercial purposes as a safe guard against take from the wild. A license is not required for private purposes.
