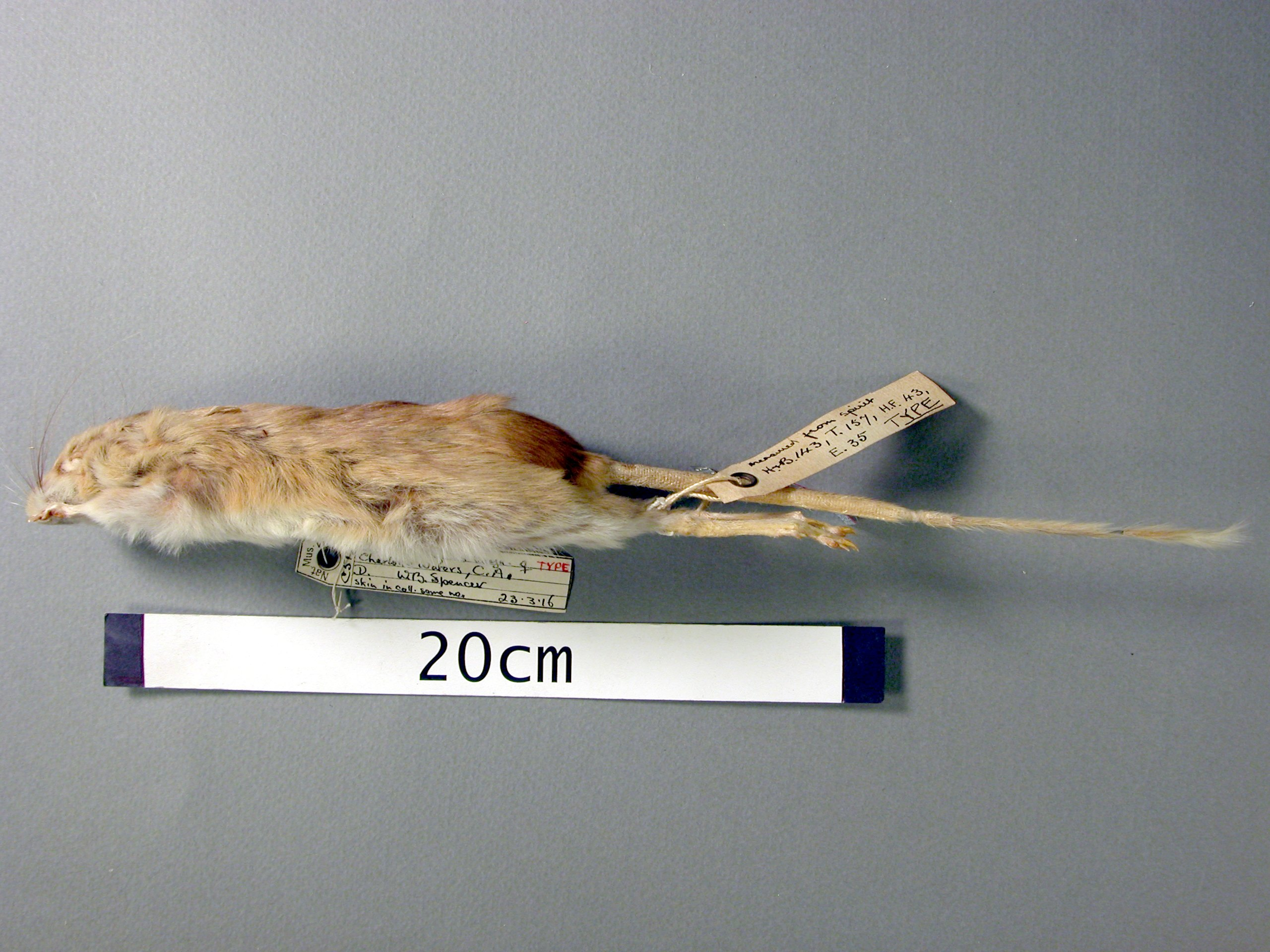

Conservation status
- Extinct (1896) (IUCN 3.1)

Scientific classification
- Kingdom: Animalia
- Phylum: Chordata
- Class: Mammalia
- Infraclass: Placentalia
- Order: Rodentia
- Family: Muridae
- Genus: Notomys
- Species: †N. amplus

Binomial name
- †Notomys amplus Brazenor, 1936

= Short-tailed hopping mouse =

Short-tailed Hopping Mouse

Extinct species of rodent

The short-tailed hopping mouse (Notomys amplus) is an extinct species of mouse in the family Muridae, endemic to the central and western arid zones of Australia. It inhabited open stony (gibber) plains with desert grasses, low shrubs and sand ridges in the area around Charlotte Waters, near Alice Springs in Central Australia. The last record is from June 1896. Only two complete specimens were collected, probably from Aboriginal Australians. It was among the largest Australian hopping mice, with an estimated body mass of around 80 grams, roughly twice that of extant species, although fossil evidence suggests the extinct great hopping mouse may have been of similar size. The short-tailed hopping mouse was predominantly brown in color, its tail probably being as long as its body. This species' decline was due to a number of factors, some of which were being hunted by predators such as foxes, cats and habitat alterations.

== Taxonomy ==
The short-tailed hopping mouse was first formally described in 1936 by William Brazenor based on two specimens collected during the Horn Scientific Expedition of 1896. It belongs to the genus Notomys, a group of Australian rodents adapted to arid environments and characterized by hopping on their hind legs. Recent phylogenetic studies suggest that N. amplus represent a "distinct evolutionary branch within the genus", diverging early in the Pleistocene.

== Physical Description ==
The short-tailed hopping mouse had elongated hind limbs adapted for hopping with shortened forelimbs for balance. Its tail was about equal in length as its head and body combined, yet shorter than that of other members of Notomys. Its fur was predominantly brown on the upper side of its body with a paler underside. N. amplus also possessed large ears and eyes, which were consistent with its nocturnal activity.

== Behavior ==
Though information is limited on the behavior of the short-tailed hopping mouse, it can be inferred from related species that it was nocturnal and fed mainly on seeds, with some plant material and invertebrates.

== Habitat ==
N. amplus inhabited the arid regions of central and western Australia. It particularly frequented open stony plains, sand dunes, and areas with sparse desert vegetation. These habitats were characterized by low rainfall and vegetation dominated by grasses and shrubs.

== Extinction ==
The short-tailed hopping mouse is believed to have become extinct in the late 19th century, with the last confirmed record dating back to 1896. Its extinction has been attributed primarily due to predation by introduced species such as the red fox (Vulpes vulpes) and feral cats (Felis catus), as well as habitat degradation from livestock grazing.

== External source ==
- Flannery, Tim & Schouten, Peter (2001). A Gap in Nature: Discovering the World's Extinct Animals. Atlantic Monthly Press, New York. ISBN 978-0-87113-797-5.
- Northern Territory Government, Chris Pavey

[May 2006] Threatened species of Northern Territory
