= List of mammals of Indonesia =

This is a list of mammals in Indonesia. It is derived from the IUCN Red List and includes those mammals that have been extinct since 1500. The following tags are used to highlight each species' conservation status:

EX	Extinct	No reasonable doubt that the last individual has died.
EW	Extinct in the wild	Known only to survive in captivity or as a naturalized populations well outside its previous range.
CR	Critically endangered	The species is in imminent risk of extinction in the wild.
EN	Endangered	The species is facing an extremely high risk of extinction in the wild.
VU	Vulnerable	The species is facing a high risk of extinction in the wild.
NT	Near threatened	The species does not meet any of the criteria that would categorise it as risking extinction but it is likely to do so in the future.
LC	Least concern	There are no current identifiable risks to the species.
DD	Data deficient	There is inadequate information to make an assessment of the risks to this species.

== Subclass: Yinotheria ==
=== Order: Monotremata (monotremes) ===
Monotremes are mammals that lay eggs instead of giving birth to live young. Momotremata comprises the platypus and echidnas.

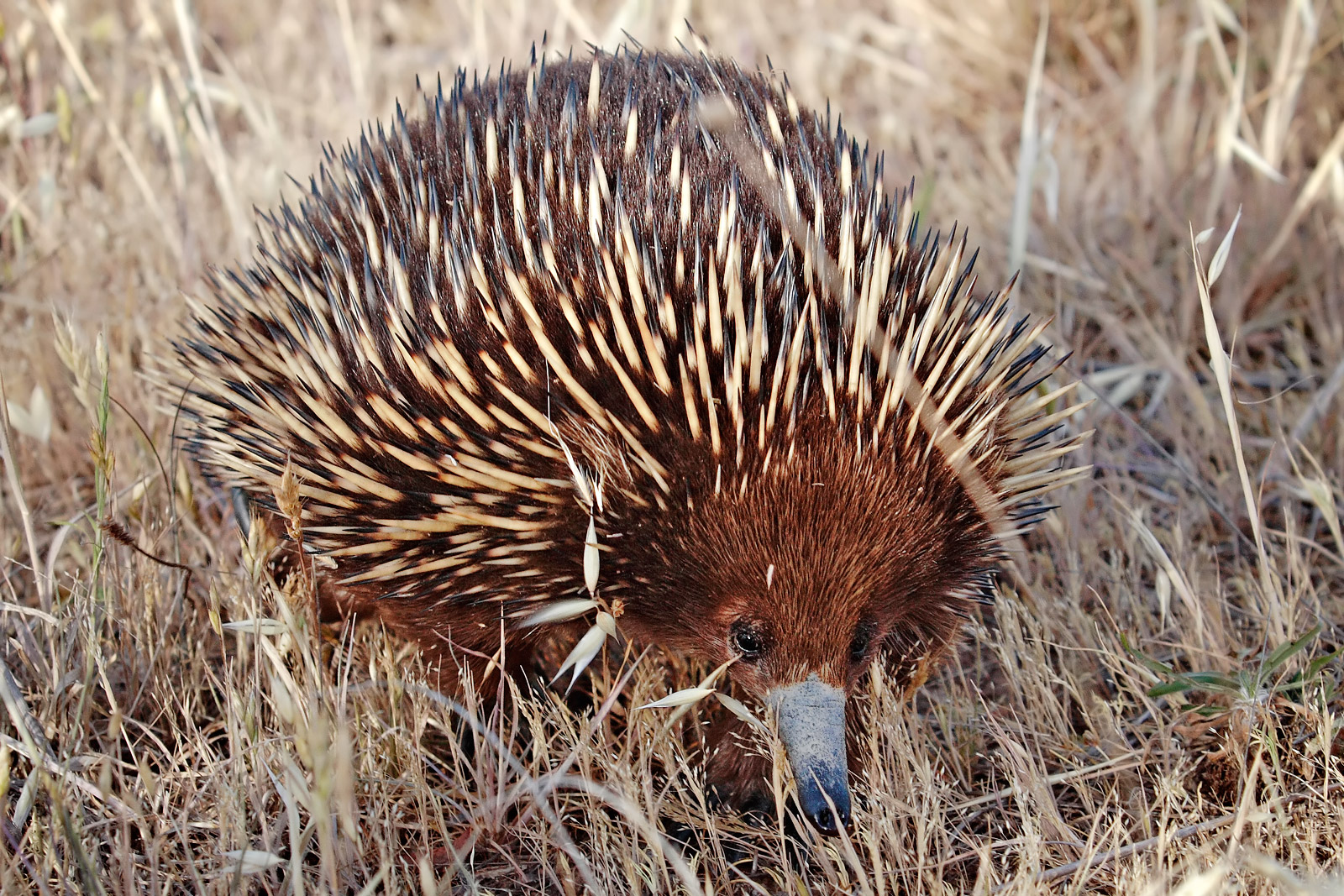
Short-beaked echidna

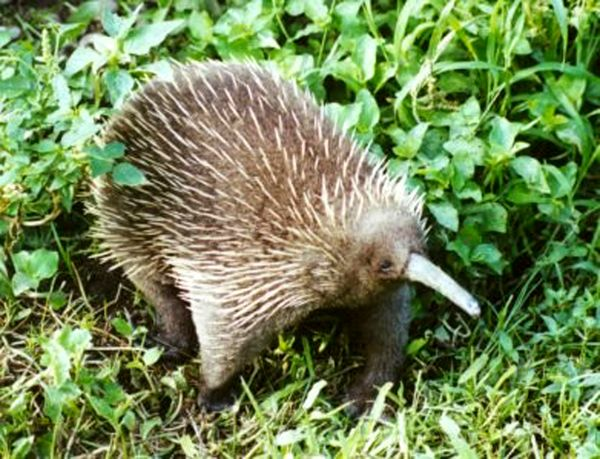
Long-beaked echidna

- Family: Tachyglossidae (echidnas)
  - Genus: Tachyglossus
    - Short-beaked echidna, T. aculeatus LC
  - Genus: Zaglossus
    - Sir David's long-beaked echidna, Z. attenboroughi CR
    - Eastern long-beaked echidna, Z. bartoni VU
    - Western long-beaked echidna, Z. bruijnii CR

== Subclass Metatheria ==
=== Order: Dasyuromorphia (carnivorous marsupials) ===
The order Dasyuromorphia comprises most of the carnivorous marsupials, including quolls, dunnarts, the numbat, the Tasmanian devil, and the recently extinct thylacine.

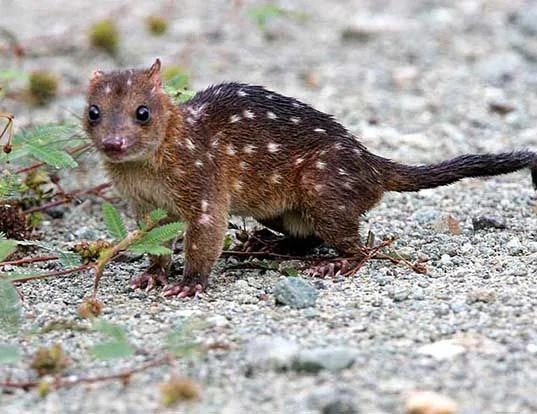
New Guinean quoll

- Family: Dasyuridae
  - Genus: Dasyurus
    - New Guinean quoll, D. albopunctatus NT
    - Bronze quoll, D. spartacus NT
  - Genus: Micromurexia
    - Habbema dasyure, Micromurexia habbema LC
  - Genus: Murexechinus
    - Black-tailed dasyure, Murexechinus melanurus LC
  - Genus: Murexia
    - Short-furred dasyure, Murexia longicaudata LC
  - Genus: Myoictis
    - Three-striped dasyure, Myoictis melas LC
    - Wallace's dasyure, Myoictis wallacii LC
    - Tate's three-striped dasyure, Myoictis wavicus DD
  - Genus: Neophascogale
    - Speckled dasyure, Neophascogale lorentzi LC
  - Genus: Phascolosorex
    - Red-bellied marsupial shrew, Phascolosorex doriae LC
    - Narrow-striped marsupial shrew, Phascolosorex dorsalis LC
  - Genus: Phascomurexia
    - Long-nosed dasyure, Phascomurexia naso LC
  - Genus: Planigale
    - New Guinean planigale, Planigale novaeguineae LC
  - Genus: Sminthopsis
    - Chestnut dunnart, Sminthopsis archeri DD
    - Carpentarian dunnart, Sminthopsis butleri VU
    - Red-cheeked dunnart, Sminthopsis virginiae LC

=== Order: Peramelemorphia (bandicoots and bilbies) ===
Peramelemorphia includes the bandicoots and bilbies: it equates approximately to the mainstream of marsupial omnivores. All members of the order are endemic to the twin land masses of Australia-New Guinea and most have the characteristic bandicoot shape: a plump, arch-backed body with a long, delicately tapering snout, very large upright ears, relatively long, thin legs, and a thin tail.

- Family: Peramelidae (bandicoots)
  - Genus: Echymipera
    - Clara's echymipera, E. clara LC
    - Common echymipera, E. kalubu LC
    - Long-nosed echymipera, E. rufescens LC
  - Genus: Isoodon
    - Northern brown bandicoot, I. macrourus LC
  - Genus: Microperoryctes
    - Arfak pygmy bandicoot, M. aplini VU
    - Striped bandicoot, M. longicauda LC
    - Mouse bandicoot, M. murina VU
  - Genus: Peroryctes
    - Raffray's bandicoot, P. raffrayana LC
  - Genus: Rhynchomeles
    - Seram bandicoot, R. prattorum EN

=== Order: Diprotodontia (kangaroos, wallabies, wombats and allies) ===
Diprotodontia is a large order of about 120 marsupial mammals including the kangaroos, wallabies, possums, koala, wombats, and many others. They are restricted to Australasia.

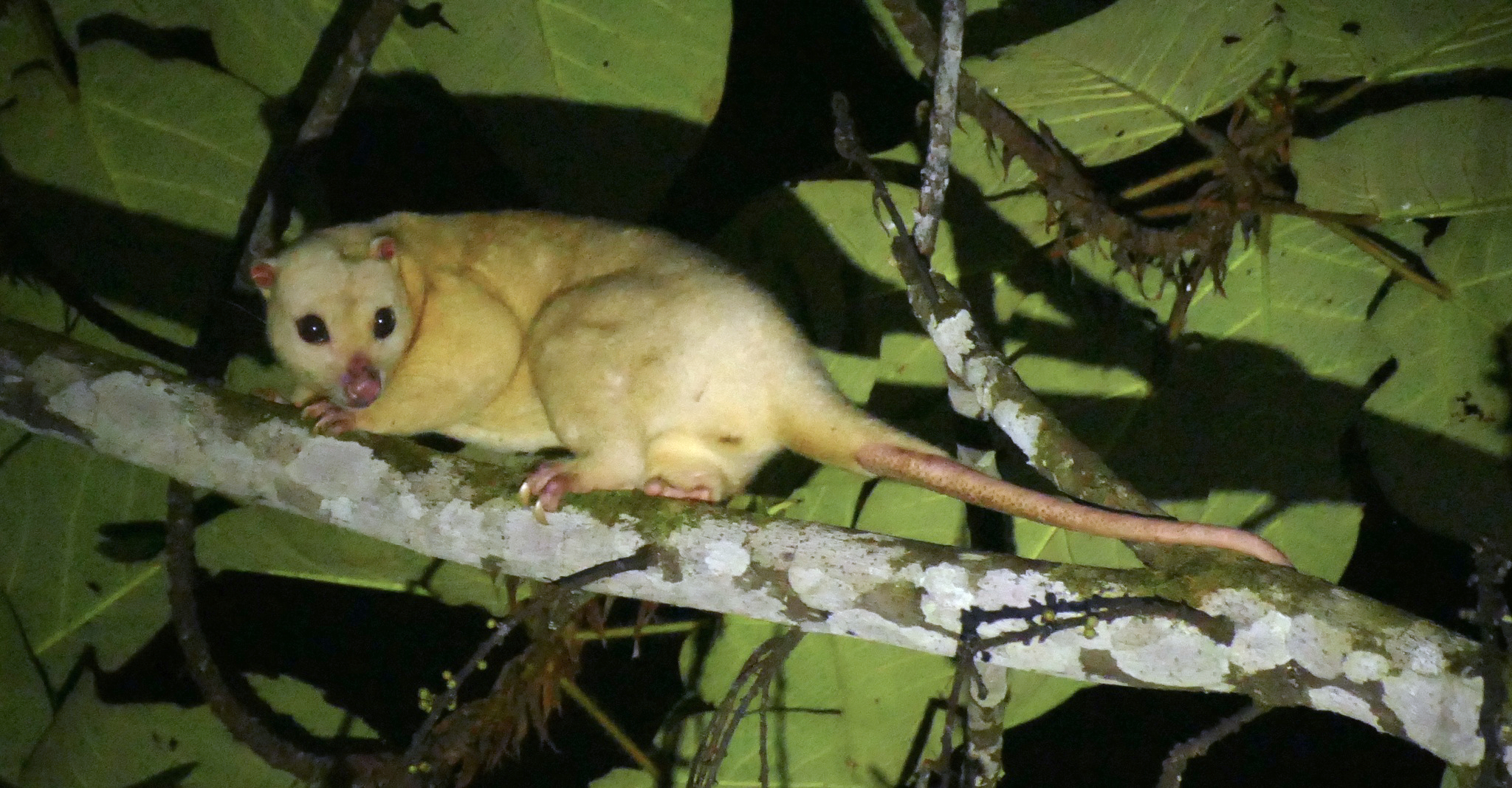
Northern common cuscus

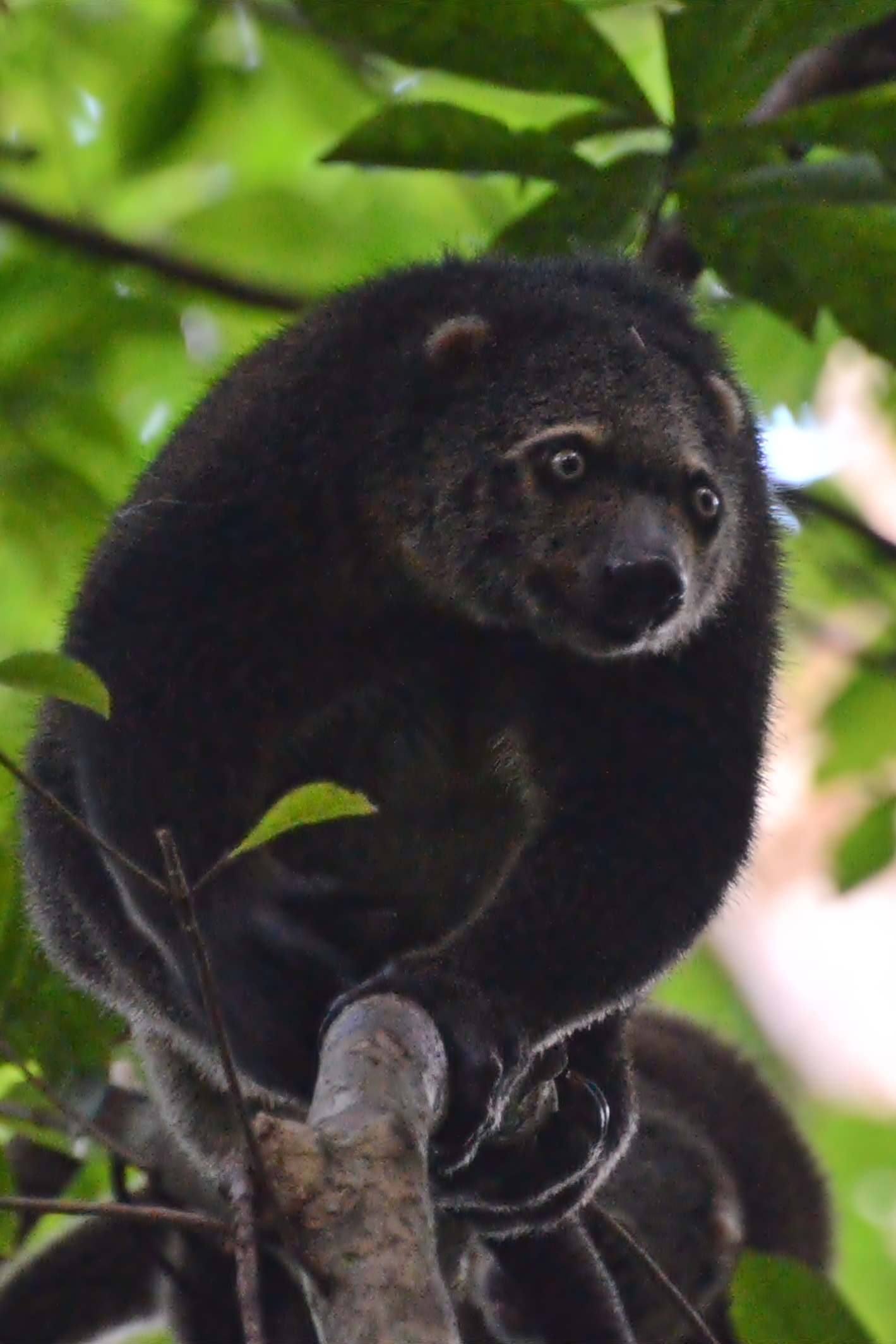
Sulawesi bear cuscus

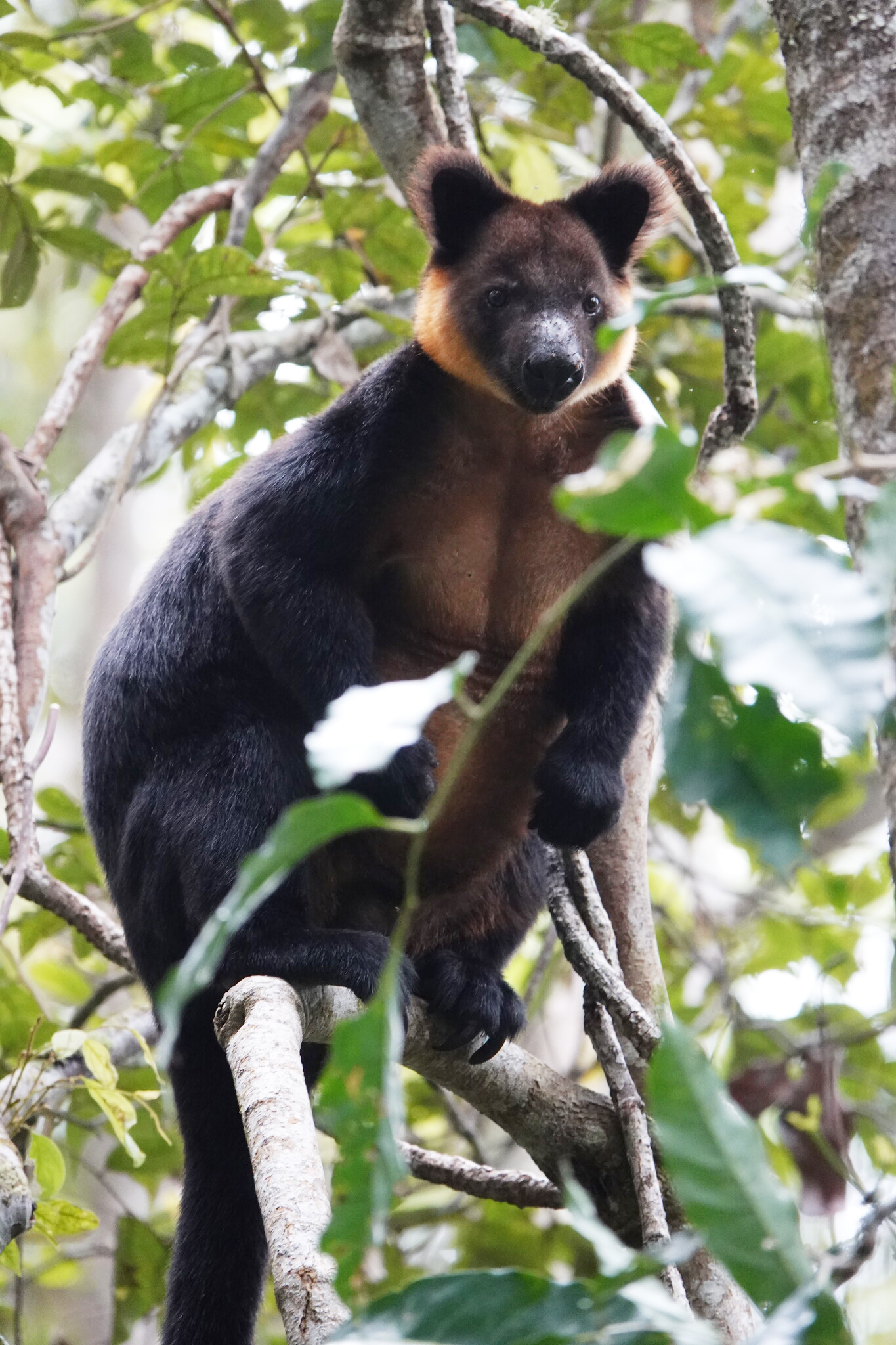
Ursine tree-kangaroo

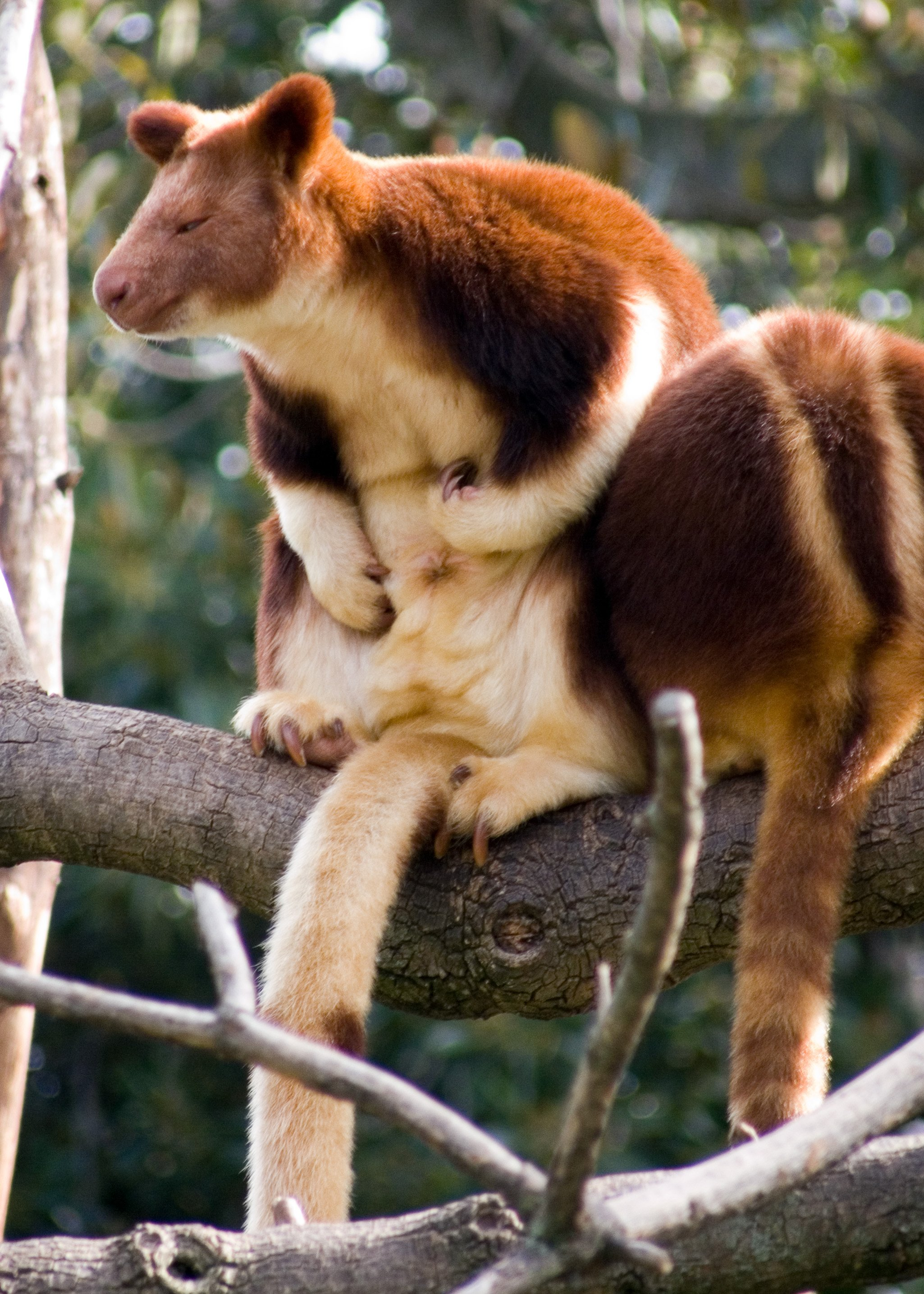
Goodfellow's tree-kangaroo

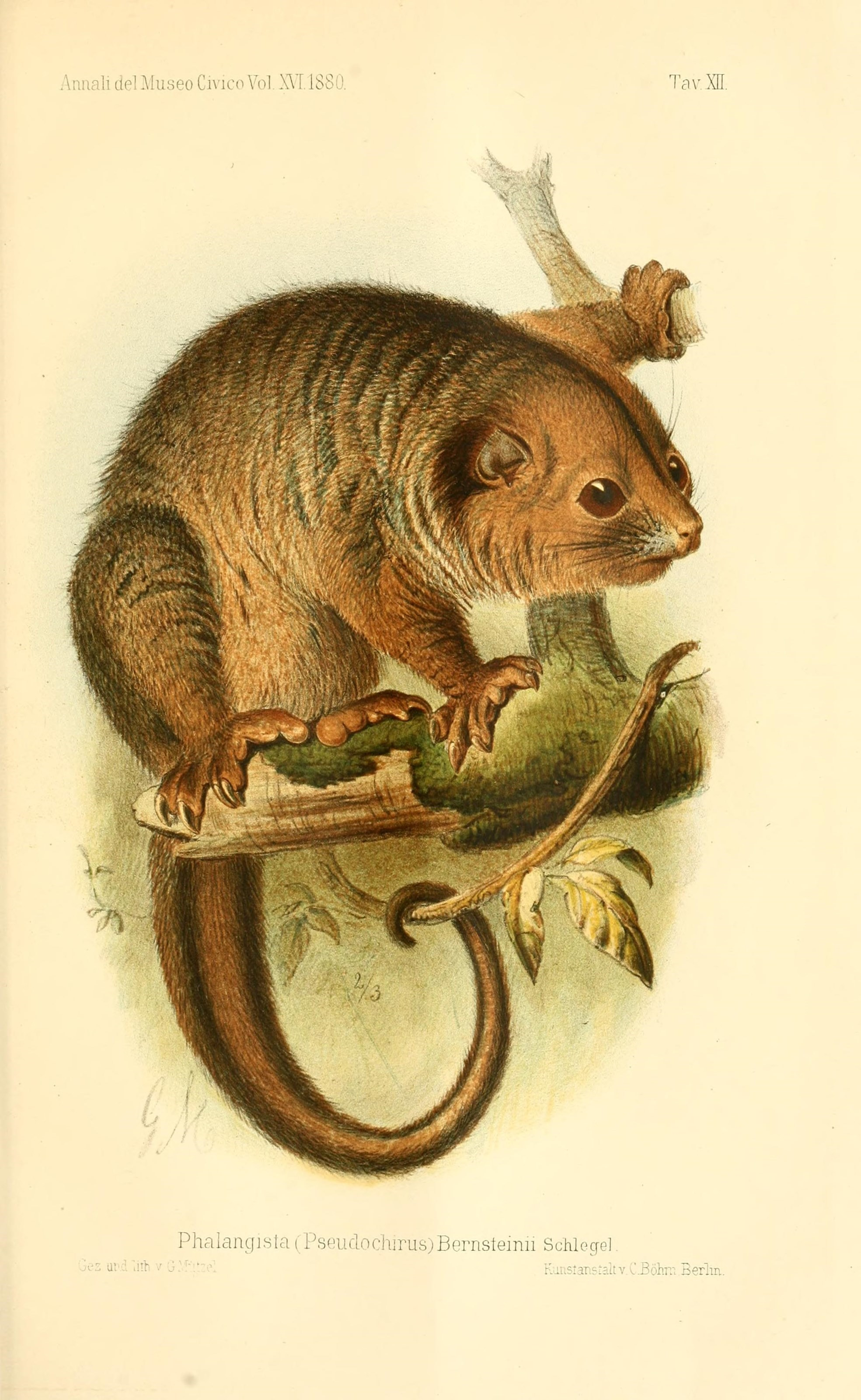
Lowland ringtail possum

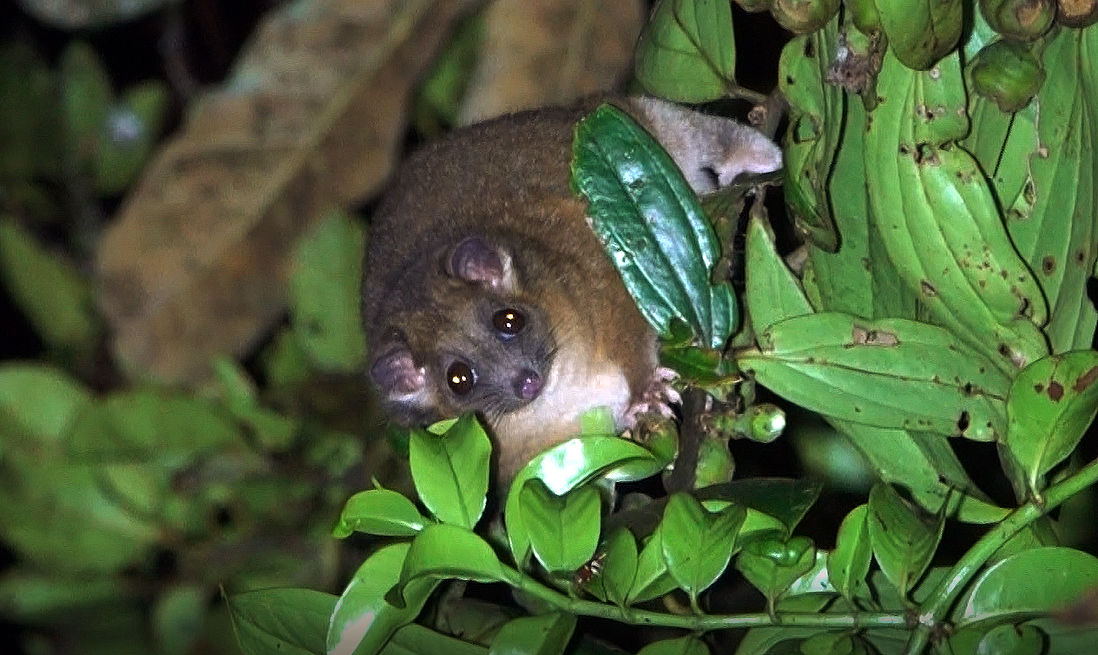
Pygmy ringtail possum

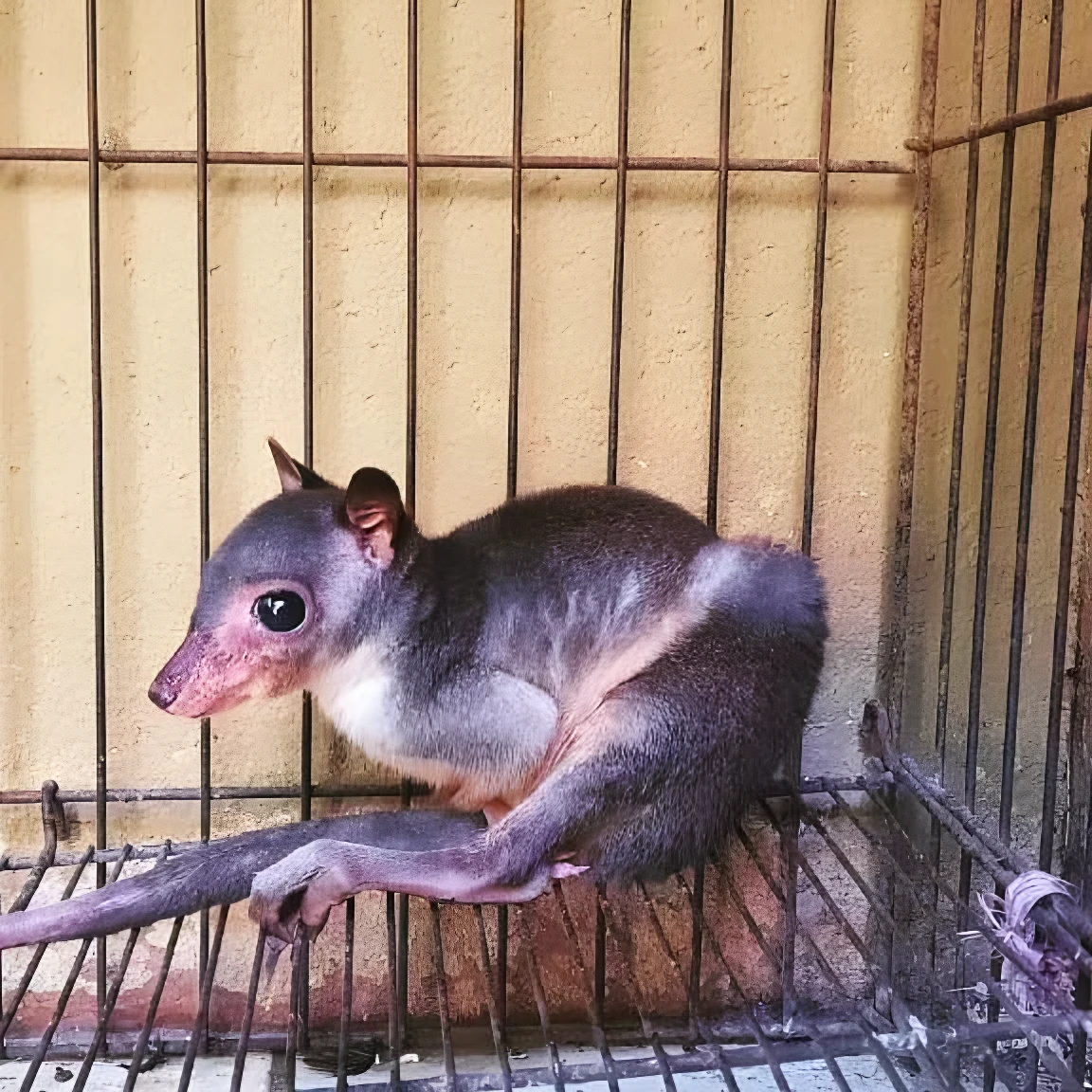
Brown dorcopsis

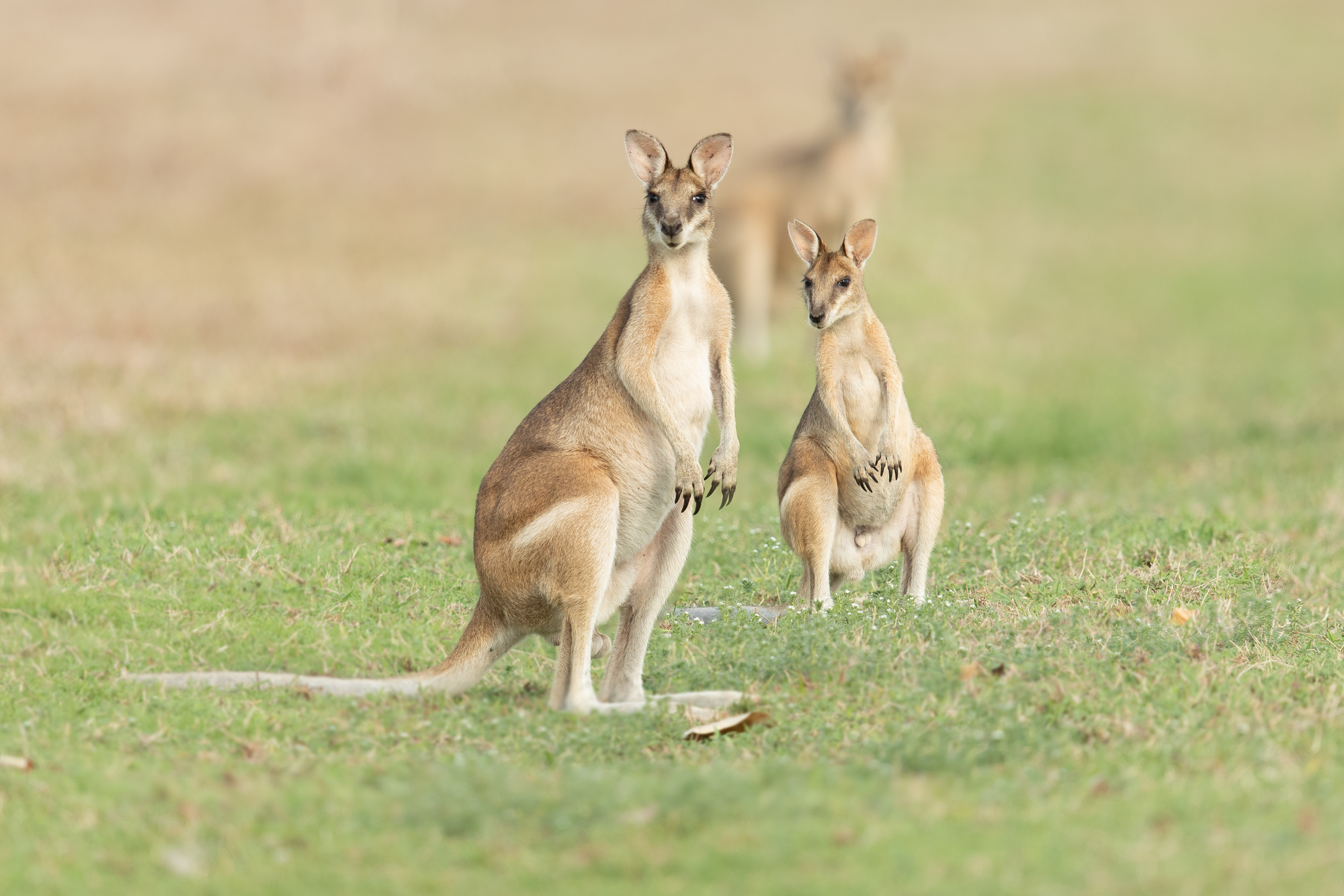
Agile wallaby

- Family Burramyidae (pygmy possums)
  - Genus: Cercartetus
    - Long-tailed pygmy possum, Cercartetus caudatus LC
- Family Phalangeridae
  - Genus: Ailurops
    - Talaud bear cuscus, Ailurops melanotis CR
    - Sulawesi bear cuscus, Ailurops ursinus VU
  - Genus: Phalanger
    - Gebe cuscus, Phalanger alexandrae EN
    - Mountain cuscus, Phalanger carmelitae LC
    - Ground cuscus, Phalanger gymnotis LC
    - Blue-eyed cuscus, Phalanger matabiru VU
    - Southern common cuscus, Phalanger mimicus LC
    - Northern common cuscus, Phalanger orientalis LC
    - Ornate cuscus, Phalanger ornatus LC
    - Rothschild's cuscus, Phalanger rothschildi LC
    - Silky cuscus, Phalanger sericeus LC
    - Stein's cuscus, Phalanger vestitus LC
  - Genus: Spilocuscus
    - Common spotted cuscus, Spilocuscus maculatus LC
    - Waigeou cuscus, Spilocuscus papuensis VU
    - Black-spotted cuscus, Spilocuscus rufoniger CR
    - Blue-eyed spotted cuscus, Spilocuscus wilsoni CR
  - Genus: Strigocuscus
    - Sulawesi dwarf cuscus, Strigocuscus celebensis NT
    - Banggai cuscus, Strigocuscus pelengensis LC
- Family: Petauridae
  - Genus: Dactylopsila
    - Great-tailed triok, Dactylopsila megalura LC
    - Long-fingered triok, Dactylopsila palpator LC
    - Striped possum, Dactylopsila trivirgata LC
  - Genus: Petaurus
    - Biak glider, Petaurus biacensis LC
    - Krefft's glider, Petaurus notatus
- Family: Pseudocheiridae
  - Genus: Pseudochirops
    - D'Albertis' ringtail possum, Pseudochirops albertisii NT
    - Plush-coated ringtail possum, Pseudochirops corinnae NT
    - Reclusive ringtail possum, Pseudochirops coronatus VU
    - Coppery ringtail possum, Pseudochirops cupreus LC
  - Genus: Pseudochirulus
    - Lowland ringtail possum, Pseudochirulus canescens LC
    - Weyland ringtail possum, Pseudochirulus caroli LC
    - Masked ringtail possum, Pseudochirulus larvatus LC
    - Pygmy ringtail possum, Pseudochirulus mayeri LC
    - Vogelkop ringtail possum, Pseudochirulus schlegeli VU
- Family: Acrobatidae
  - Genus: Distoechurus
    - Feather-tailed possum, Distoechurus pennatus LC
- Family: Macropodidae
  - Genus: Dendrolagus
    - Goodfellow's tree-kangaroo, Dendrolagus goodfellowi EN
    - Grizzled tree-kangaroo, Dendrolagus inustus VU
    - Dingiso, Dendrolagus mbaiso EN
    - Golden-mantled tree-kangaroo, Dendrolagus pulcherrimus CR
    - Seri's tree-kangaroo, Dendrolagus stellarum VU
    - Ursine tree-kangaroo, Dendrolagus ursinus VU
  - Genus: Dorcopsis
    - White-striped dorcopsis, Dorcopsis hageni LC
    - Gray dorcopsis, Dorcopsis luctuosa VU
    - Brown dorcopsis, Dorcopsis muelleri LC
  - Genus: Dorcopsulus
    - Small dorcopsis, Dorcopsulus vanheurni NT
  - Genus: Macropus
    - Agile wallaby, Macropus agilis LC
  - Genus: Thylogale
    - Brown's pademelon, Thylogale browni VU
    - Dusky pademelon, Thylogale brunii VU
    - Red-legged pademelon, Thylogale stigmatica LC

== Subclass Eutheria ==
=== Order: Proboscidea (elephants) ===
The elephants comprise three living species and are the largest living land animals.

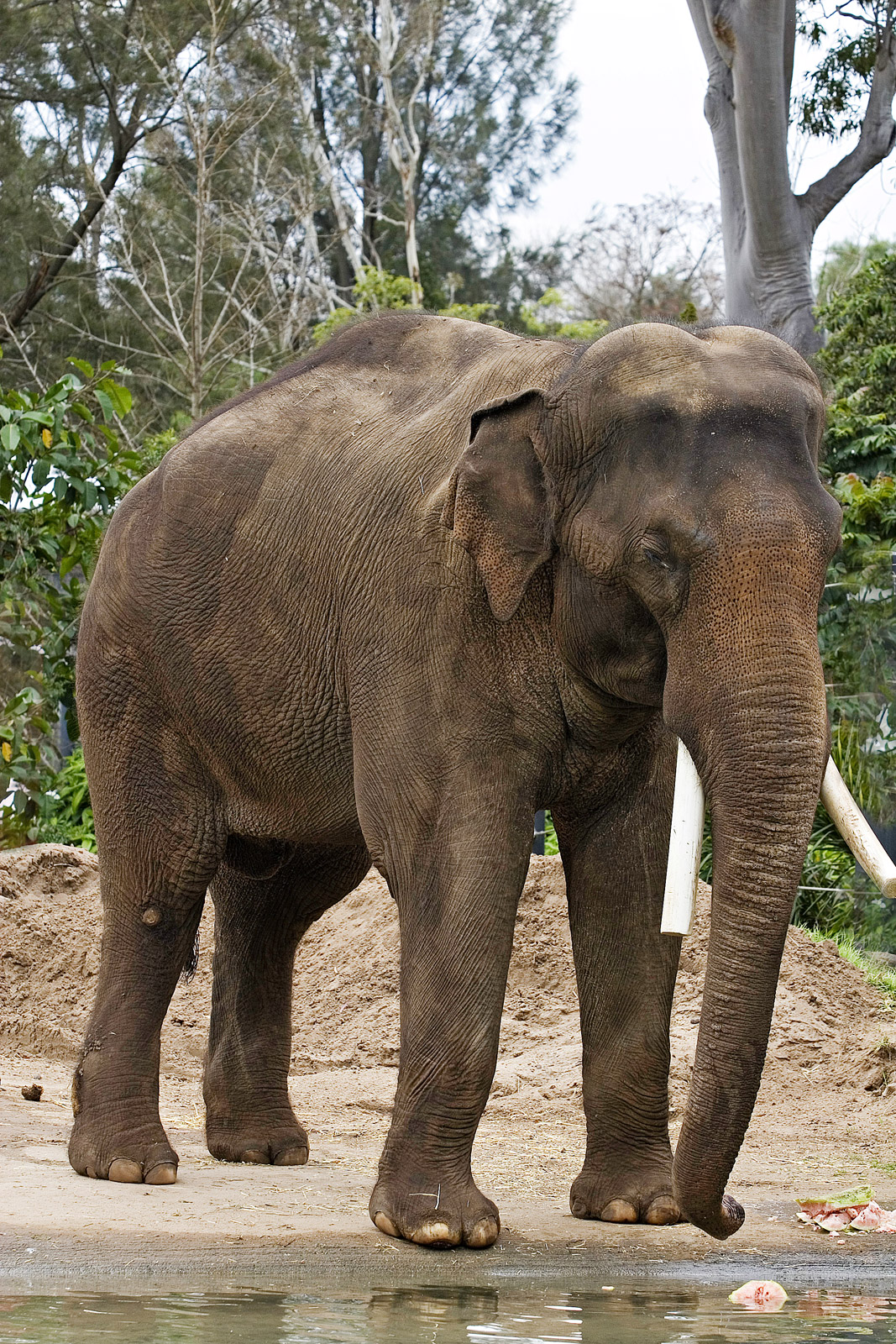
Asian elephant

- Family: Elephantidae
  - Genus: Elephas
    - Asian elephant, E. maximus EN

=== Order: Sirenia (manatees and dugongs) ===
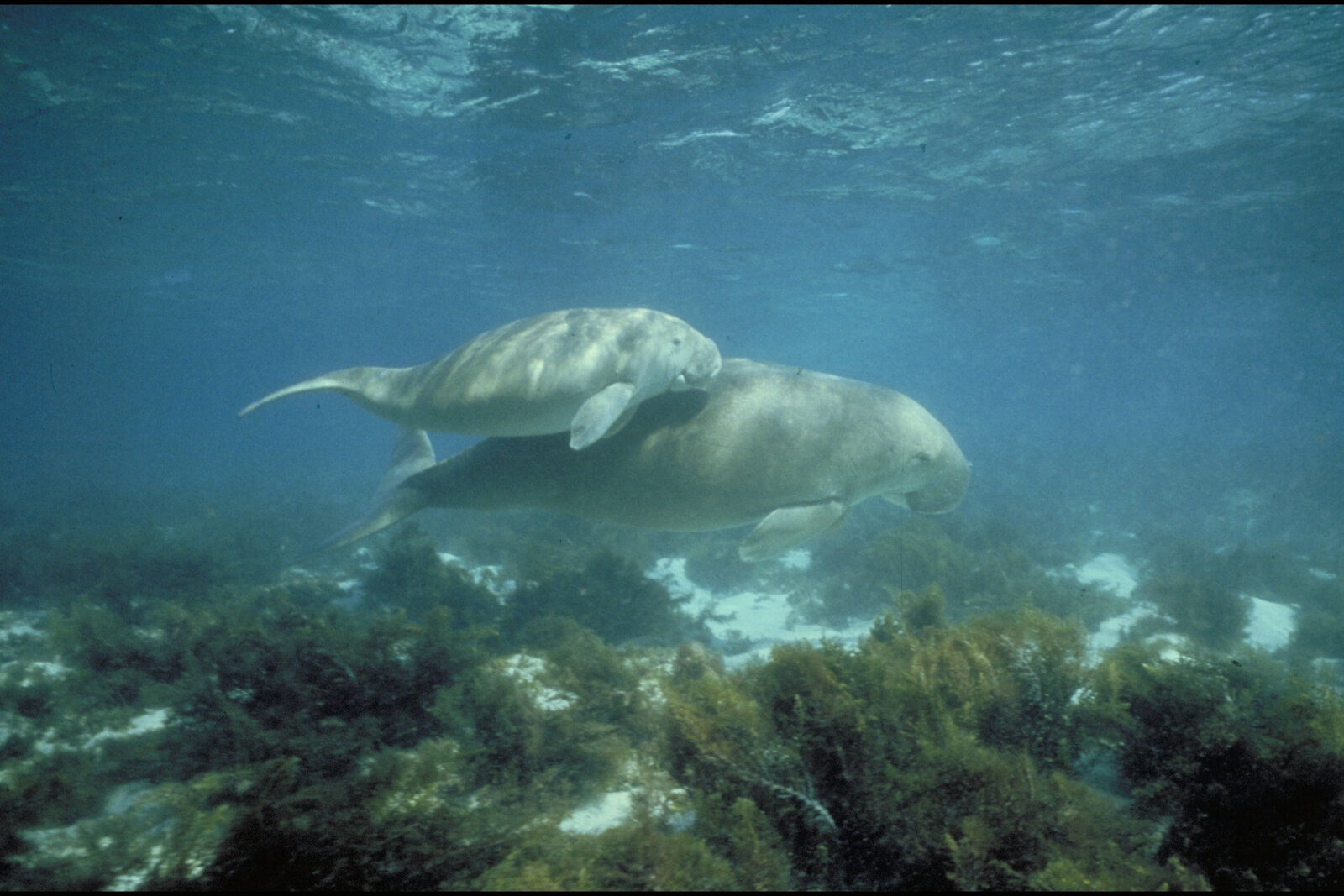
Dugong

Sirenia is an order of fully aquatic, herbivorous mammals that inhabit rivers, estuaries, coastal marine waters, swamps, and marine wetlands. All four species are endangered.

- Family Dugongidae
  - Genus: Dugong
    - Dugong, D. dugon VU

=== Order: Scandentia (treeshrews) ===
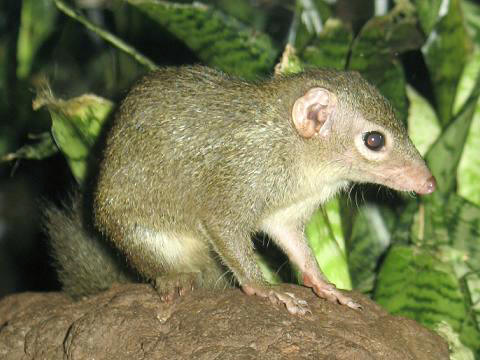
Common treeshew

The treeshrews are small mammals native to the tropical forests of Southeast Asia. Although called treeshrews, they are not true shrews and are not all arboreal.

- Family Tupaiidae
  - Genus: Dendrogale
    - Bornean smooth-tailed treeshrew, D. melanura DD
  - Genus: Tupaia
    - Golden-bellied treeshrew, T. chrysogaster VU
    - Striped treeshrew, T. dorsalis DD
    - Common treeshrew, T. glis LC
    - Slender treeshrew, T. gracilis LC
    - Horsfield's treeshrew, T. javanica LC
    - Long-footed treeshrew, T. longipes LC
    - Pygmy treeshrew, T. minor LC
    - Painted treeshrew, T. picta LC
    - Ruddy treeshrew, T. splendidula LC
    - Large treeshrew, T. tana LC
- Family Ptilocercidae
  - Genus: Ptilocercus
    - Pen-tailed treeshrew, P. lowii LC

=== Order: Dermoptera (colugos) ===
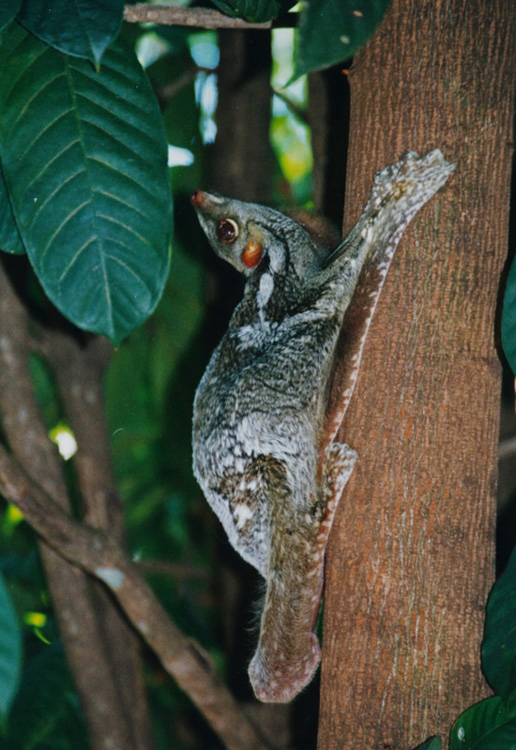
Sunda flying lemur

The two species of colugos make up the order Dermoptera. They are arboreal gliding mammals found in Southeast Asia.

- Family Cynocephalidae
  - Genus: Galeopterus
    - Sunda flying lemur, G. variegatus LC

=== Order: Primates ===
The order Primates contains humans and their closest relatives: lemurs, lorisoids, monkeys, and apes.

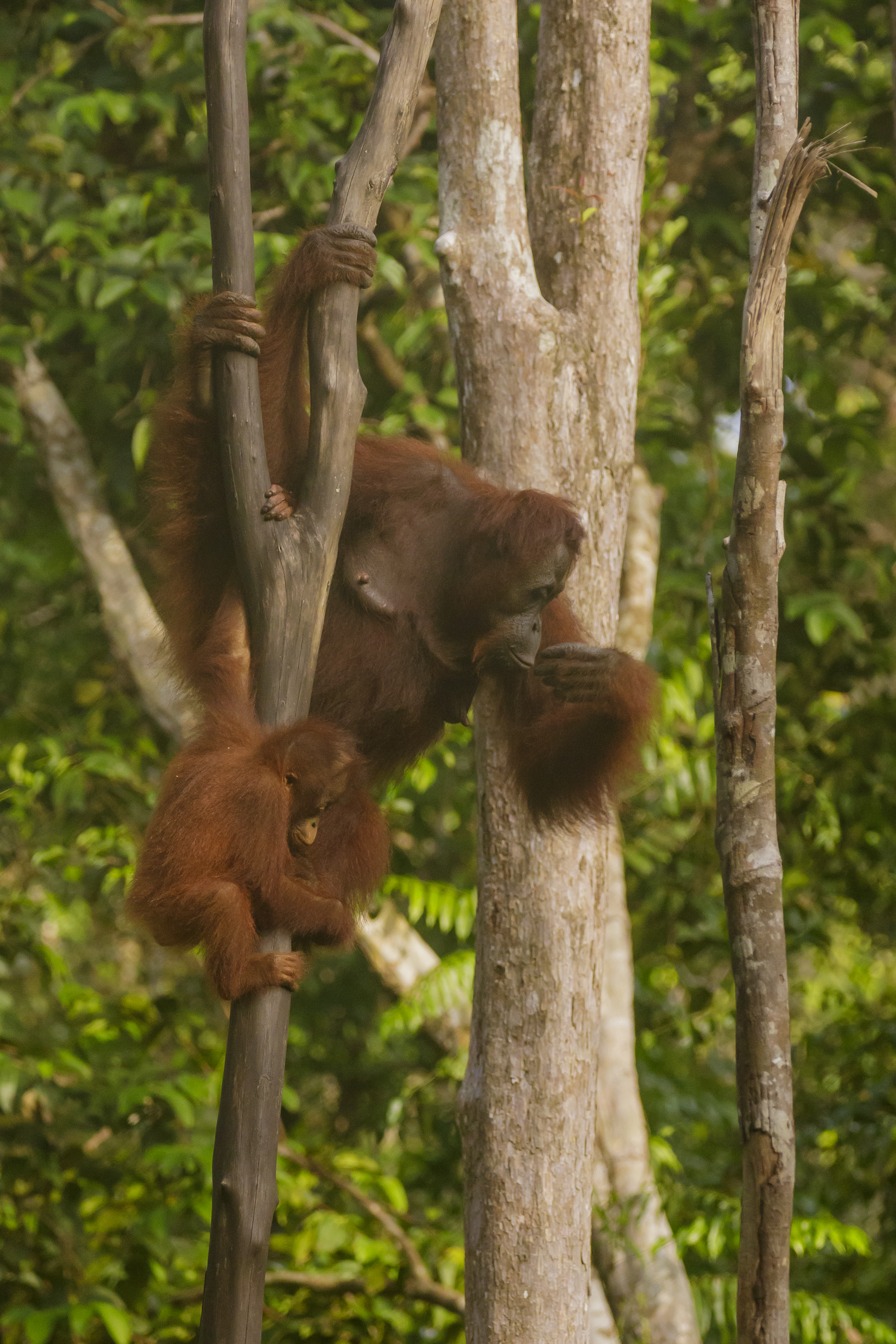
Bornean orangutan

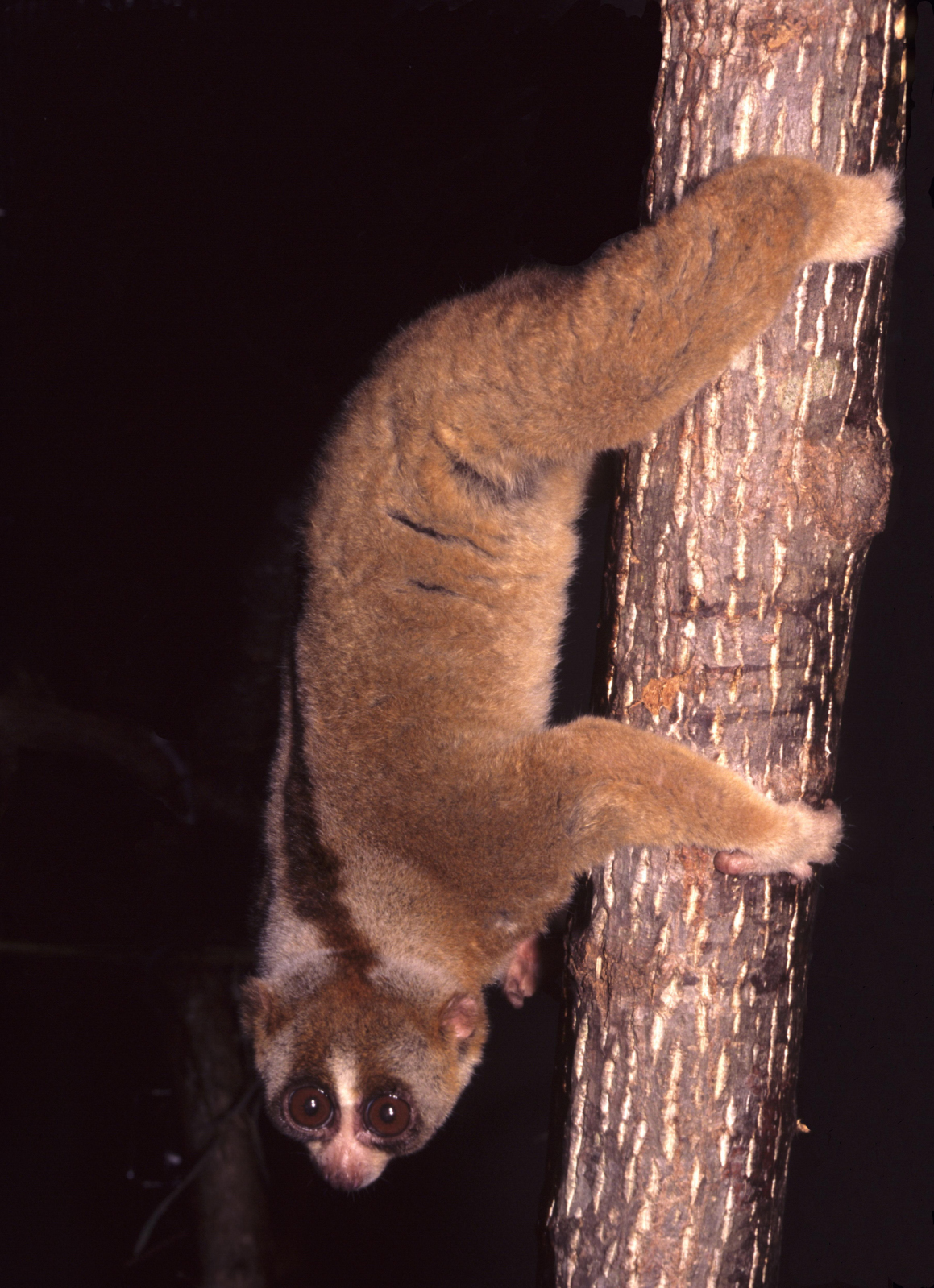
Sunda slow loris

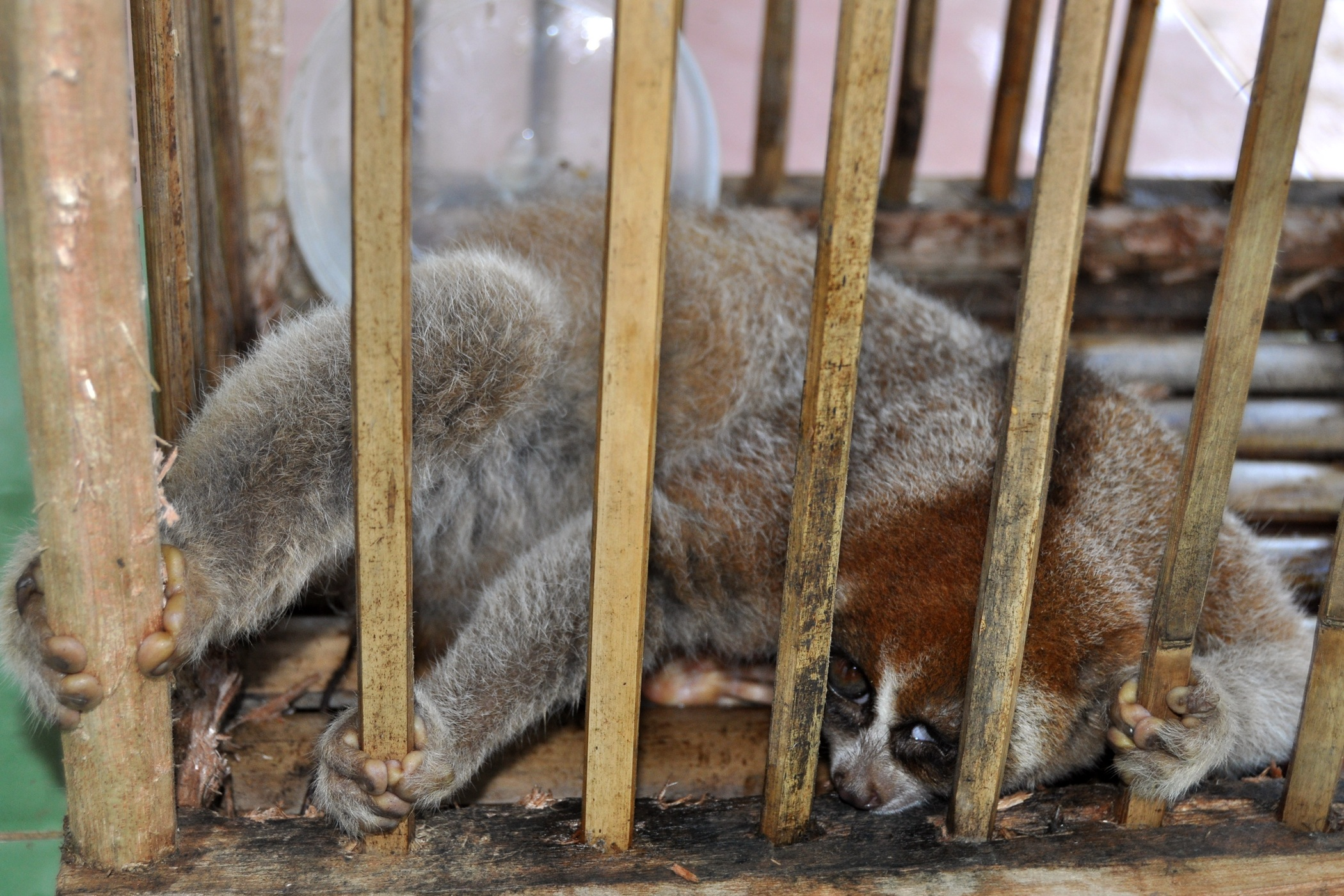
Bornean slow loris

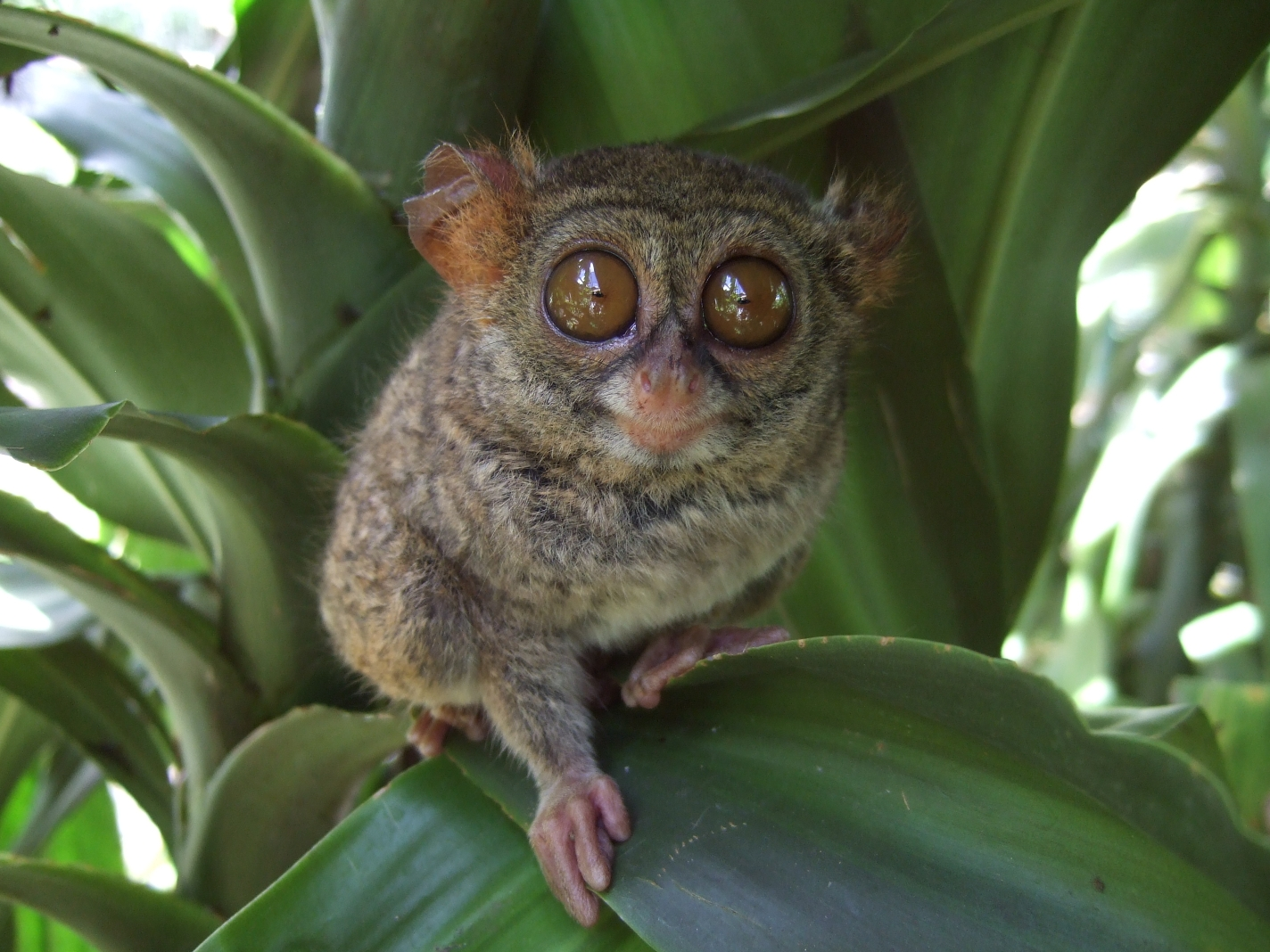
Spectral tarsier

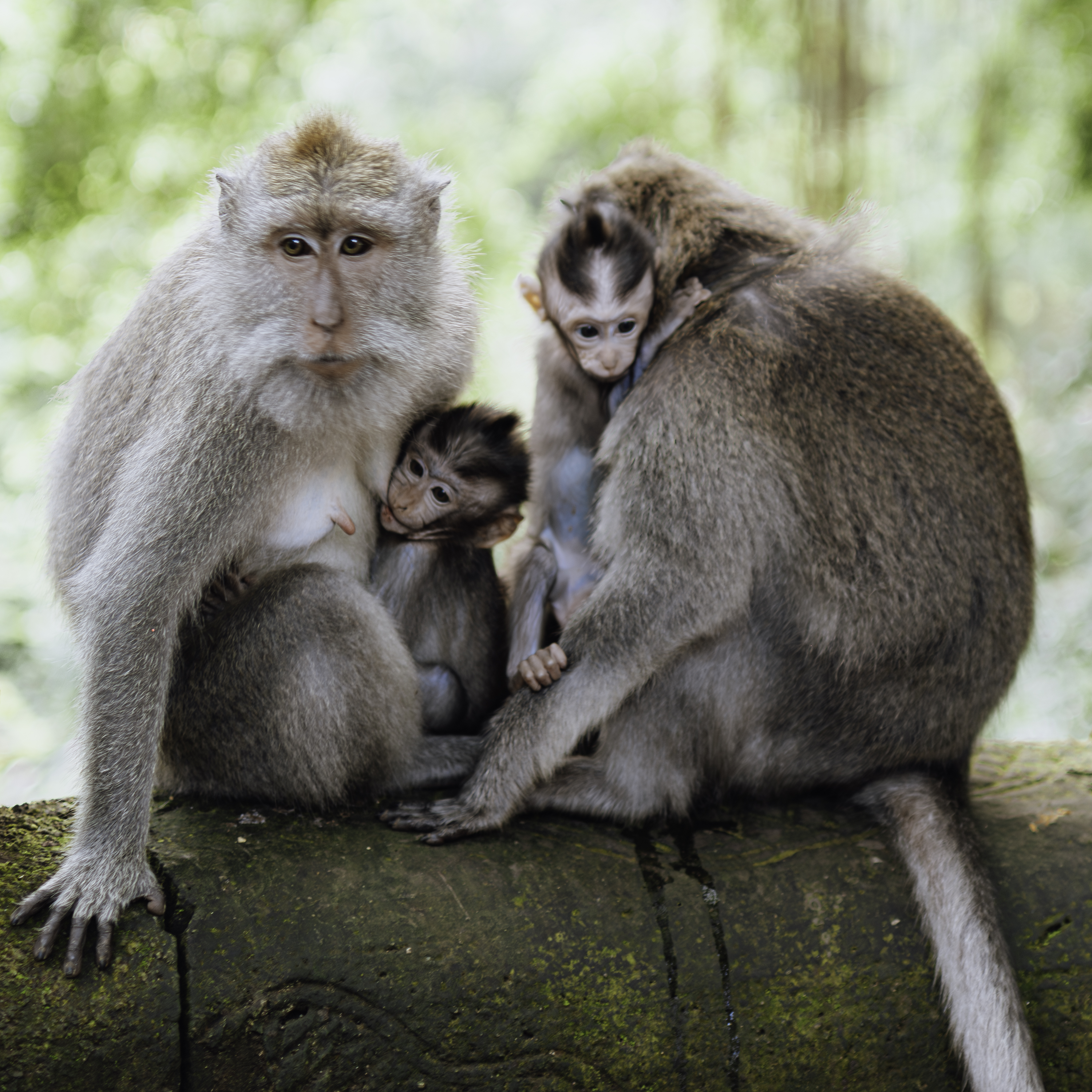
Crab-eating macaque

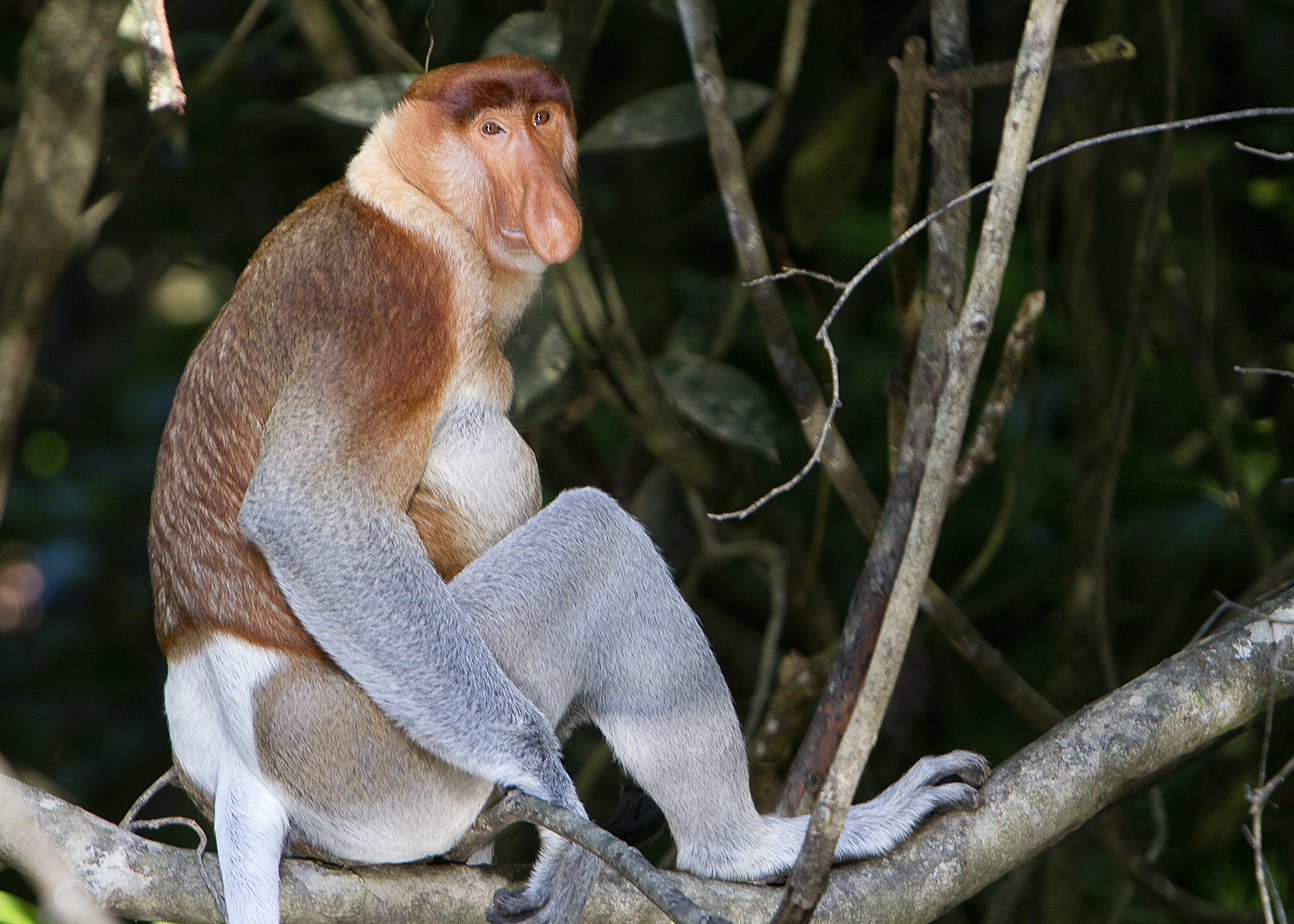
Proboscis monkey

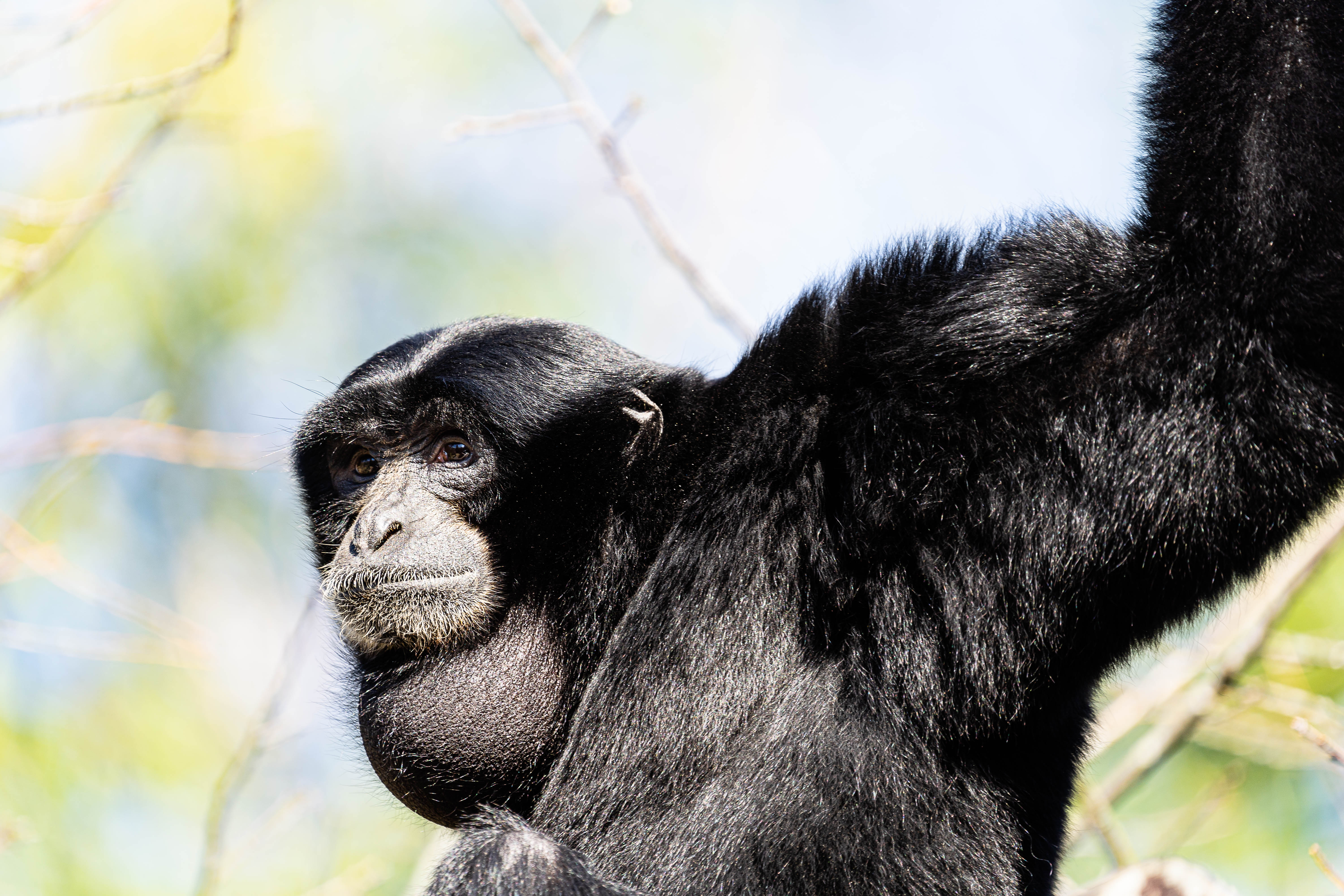
Siamang

- Family Lorisidae
  - Genus: Nycticebus
    - Bangka slow loris, N. bancanus CR
    - Bornean slow loris, N. borneanus VU
    - Sunda slow loris, N. coucang EN
    - Javan slow loris, N. javanicus CR
    - Kayan River slow loris, N. kayan
    - Philippine slow loris, N. menagensis VU
- Family Tarsiidae
  - Genus: Cephalopachus
    - Horsfield's tarsier, C. bancanus VU
  - Genus: Tarsius
    - Dian's tarsier, T. dentatus VU
    - Lariang tarsier, T. lariang DD
    - Peleng tarsier, T. pelengensis EN
    - Pygmy tarsier, T. pumilus EN
    - Sangihe tarsier, T. sangirensis EN
    - Spectral tarsier, T. tarsier VU
- Family Cercopithecidae (Old World monkeys)
  - Genus: Macaca
    - Crab-eating macaque, M. fascicularis EN
    - Heck's macaque, M. hecki VU
    - Moor macaque, M. maura EN
    - Southern pig-tailed macaque, M. nemestrina EN
    - Celebes crested macaque, M. nigra CR
    - Gorontalo macaque, M. nigrescens VU
    - Booted macaque, M. ochreata VU
    - Pagai Island macaque, M. pagensis CR
    - Siberut macaque, M. siberu EN
    - Tonkean macaque, M. tonkeana VU
  - Genus: Nasalis
    - Proboscis monkey, N. larvatus EN
  - Genus: Presbytis
    - Black-and-white langur, P. bicolor DD
    - Sarawak surili, P. chrysomelas CR
    - Javan surili, P. comata VU
    - Miller's langur, P. canicrus EN
    - White-fronted surili, P. frontata VU
    - Hose's langur, P. hosei VU
    - Black-crested Sumatran langur, P. melalophos EN
    - Mitered langur, P. mitrata EN
    - Natuna Island surili, P. natunae VU
    - East Sumatran banded langur, P. percura CR
    - Mentawai langur, P. potenziani CR
    - Maroon leaf monkey, P. rubicunda VU
    - Saban grizzled langur, P. sabana EN
    - White-thighed surili, P. siamensis NT
    - Siberut langur, P. siberu EN
    - Black Sumatran langur, P. sumatrana EN
    - Thomas's langur, P. thomasi VU
  - Genus: Simias
    - Pig-tailed langur, S. concolor CR
  - Genus: Trachypithecus
    - East Javan langur, T. auratus VU
    - Silvery lutung, T. cristatus VU
    - West Javan langur, T. mauritius VU
- Family Hylobatidae (gibbons)
  - Genus: Hylobates
    - Agile gibbon, H. agilis EN
    - Bornean white-bearded gibbon, H. albibarbis EN
    - Kloss's gibbon, H. klossii EN
    - Lar gibbon, H. lar EN
    - Silvery gibbon, H. moloch EN
    - Müller's gibbon, H. muelleri EN
  - Genus: Symphalangus
    - Siamang, S. syndactylus EN
- Family Hominidae
  - Genus: Pongo
    - Sumatran orangutan, P. abelii CR
    - Bornean orangutan, P. pygmaeus CR
    - Tapanuli orangutan, P. tapanuliensis CR

=== Order: Rodentia (rodents) ===
Rodents make up the largest order of mammals, with over 40% of mammalian species. They have two incisors in the upper and lower jaw which grow continually and must be kept short by gnawing. Most rodents are small though the capybara can weigh up to 45 kg (99 lb).

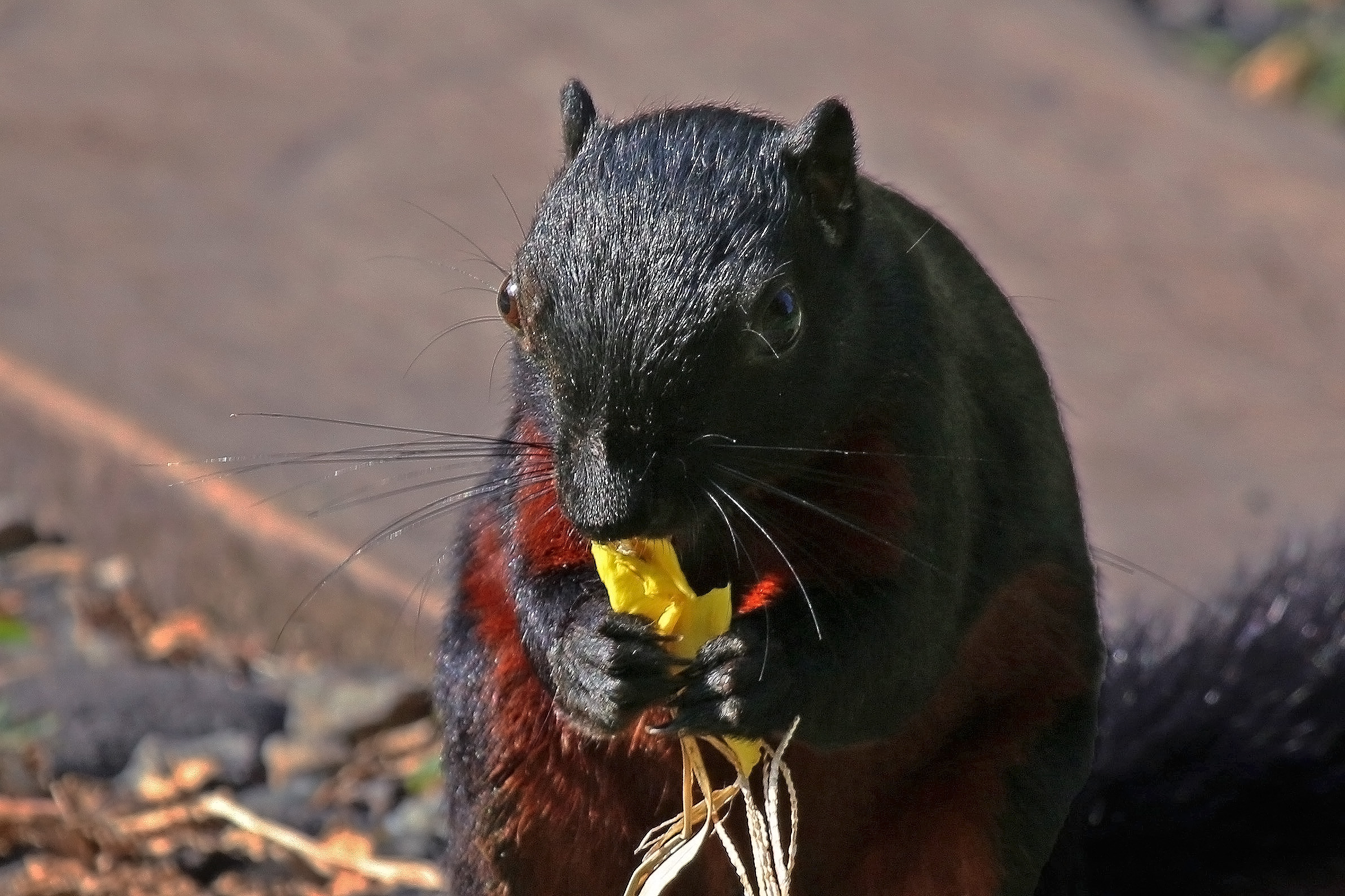
Prevost's squirrel

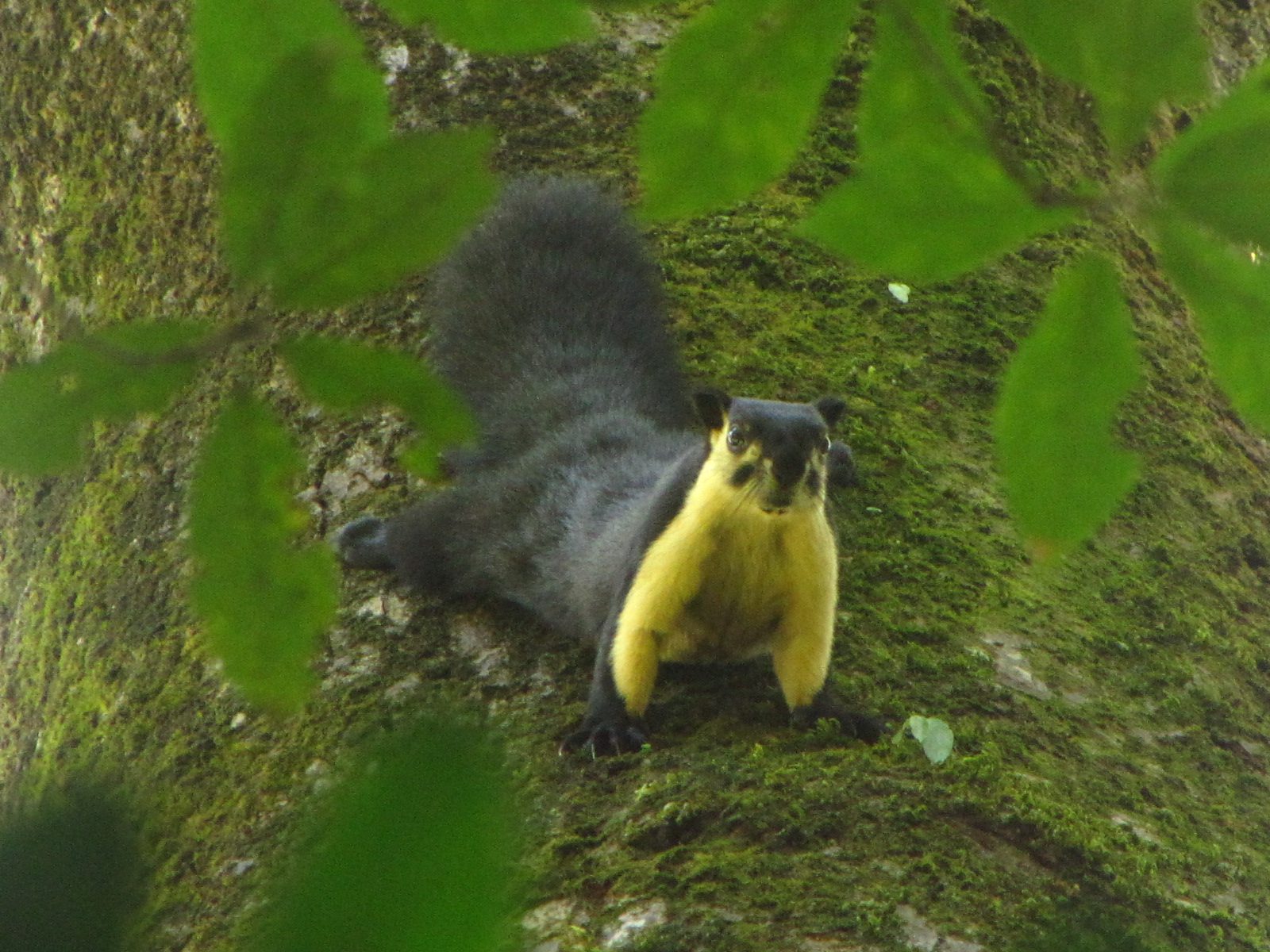
Black giant squirrel

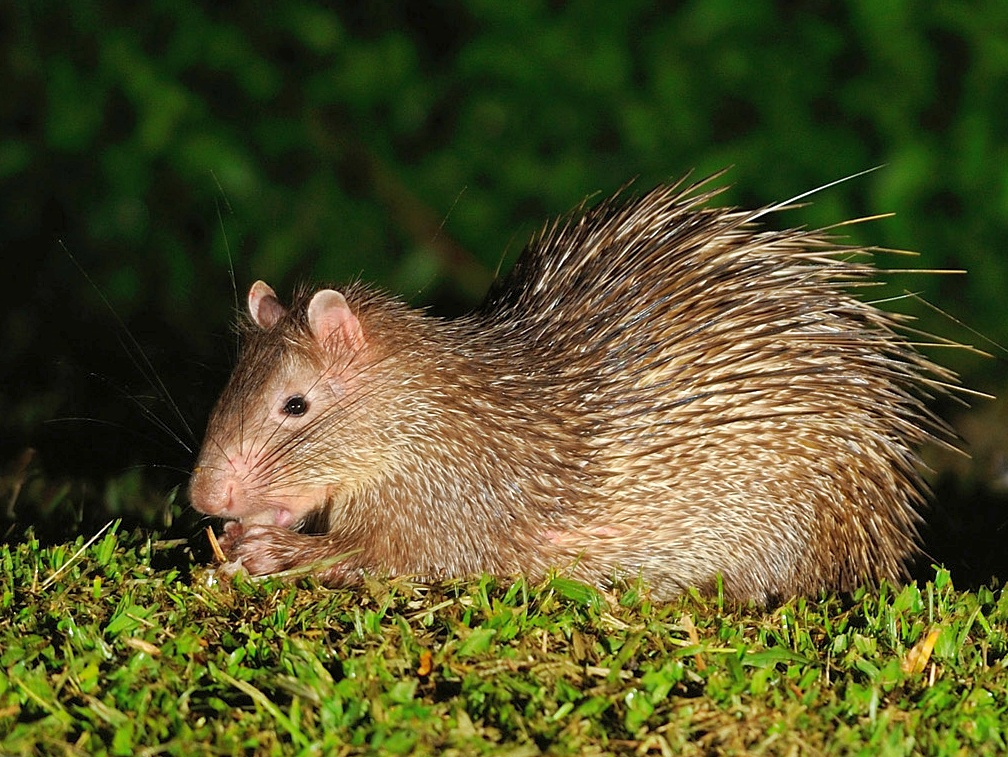
Asiatic brush-tailed porcupine

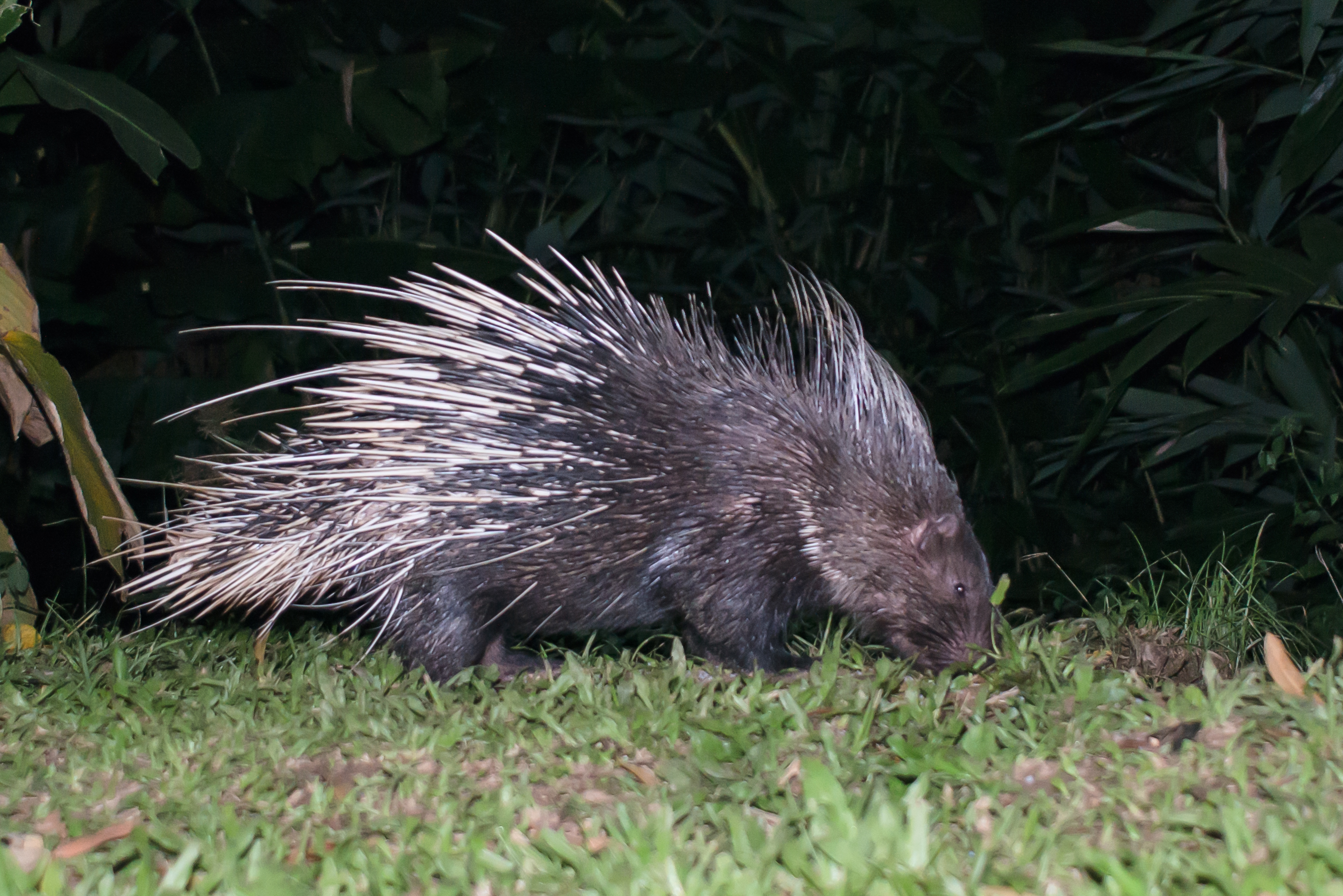
Malayan porcupine

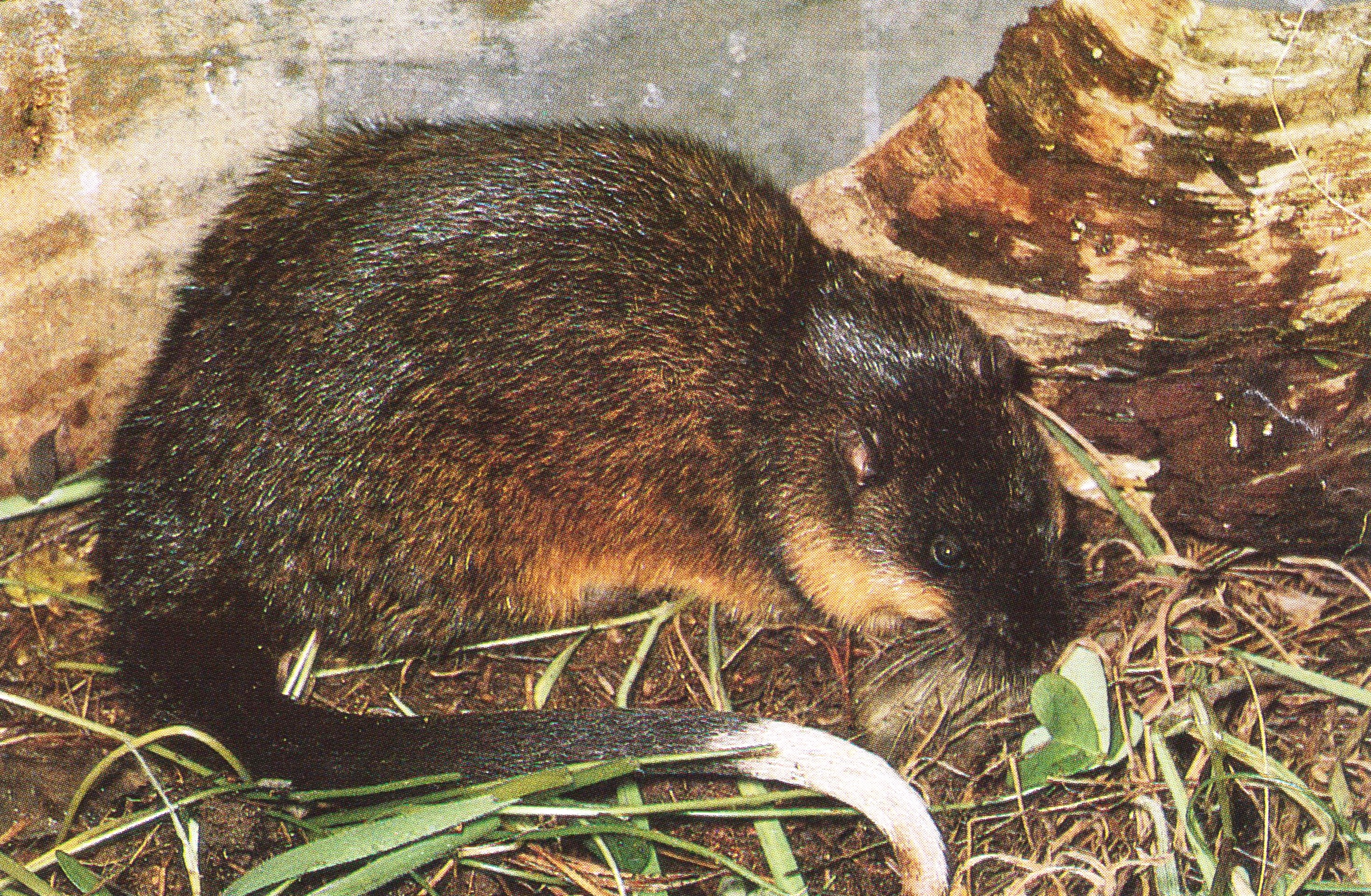
Rakali

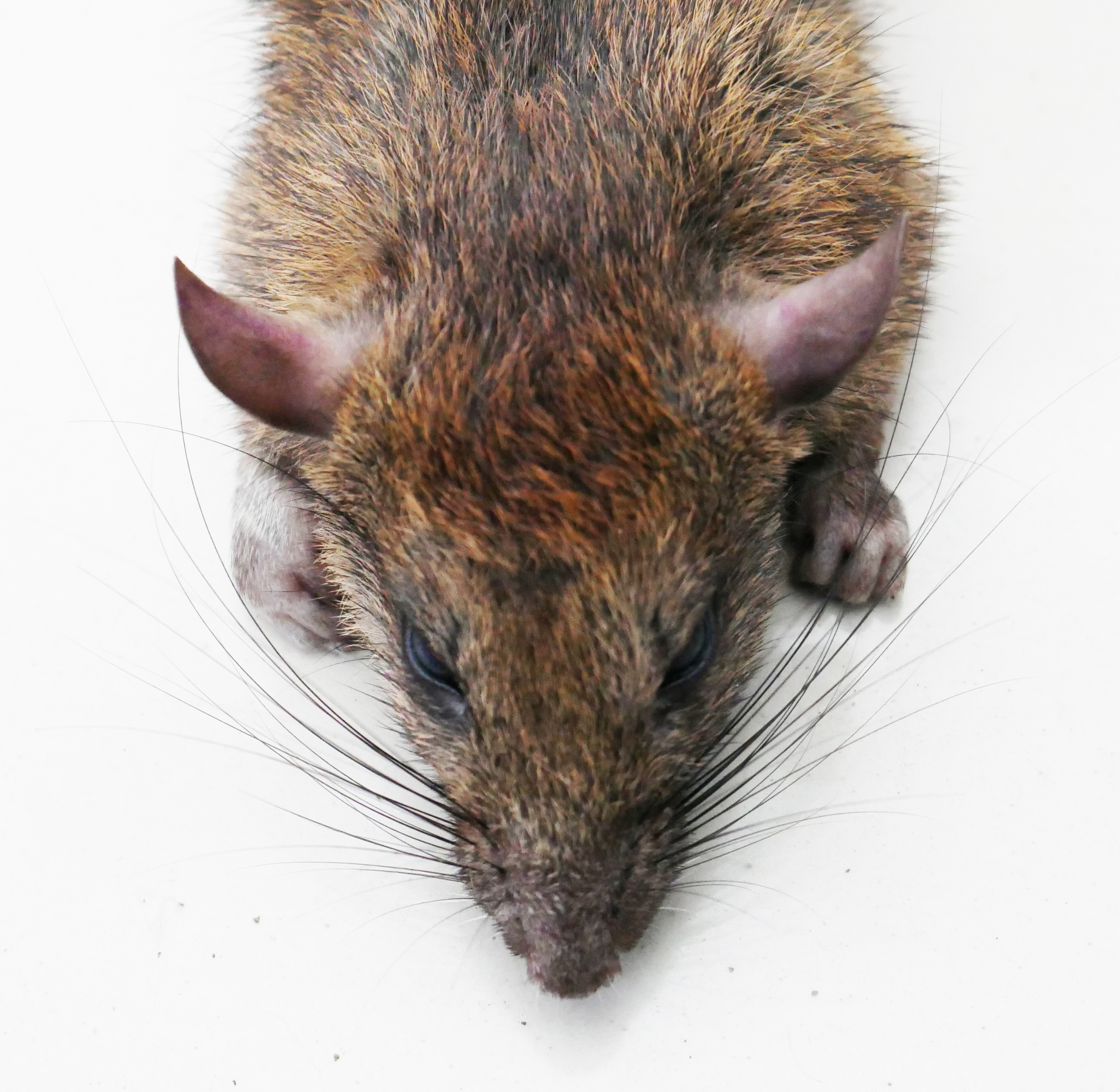
Tanezumi rat

- Family Hystricidae (Old World porcupines)
  - Genus: Atherurus
    - Asiatic brush-tailed porcupine, Atherurus macrourus LC
  - Genus: Hystrix
    - Malayan porcupine, H. brachyura LC
    - Thick-spined porcupine, Hystrix crassispinis LC
    - Sunda porcupine, Hystrix javanica LC
    - Sumatran porcupine, Hystrix sumatrae LC
  - Genus: Trichys
    - Long-tailed porcupine, Trichys fasciculata LC
- Family Sciuridae (squirrels)
  - Genus: Aeromys
    - Black flying squirrel, Aeromys tephromelas DD
    - Thomas's flying squirrel, Aeromys thomasi LC
  - Genus: Callosciurus
    - Kloss's squirrel, Callosciurus albescens DD
    - Mentawai squirrel, Callosciurus melanogaster VU
    - Black-striped squirrel, Callosciurus nigrovittatus LC
    - Plantain squirrel, Callosciurus notatus LC
    - Borneo black-banded squirrel, Callosciurus orestes LC
    - Prevost's squirrel, Callosciurus prevostii LC
  - Genus: Dremomys
    - Bornean mountain ground squirrel, Dremomys everetti LC
  - Genus: Exilisciurus
    - Least pygmy squirrel, Exilisciurus exilis DD
    - Tufted pygmy squirrel, Exilisciurus whiteheadi LC
  - Genus: Hylopetes
    - Bartel's flying squirrel, Hylopetes bartelsi DD
    - Gray-cheeked flying squirrel, Hylopetes lepidus DD
    - Jentink's flying squirrel, Hylopetes platyurus DD
    - Sipora flying squirrel, Hylopetes sipora EN
    - Red-cheeked flying squirrel, Hylopetes spadiceus LC
    - Sumatran flying squirrel, Hylopetes winstoni DD
  - Genus: Hyosciurus
    - Montane long-nosed squirrel, Hyosciurus heinrichi LC
    - Lowland long-nosed squirrel, Hyosciurus ileile VU
  - Genus: Iomys
    - Javanese flying squirrel, Iomys horsfieldii LC
    - Mentawi flying squirrel, Iomys sipora EN
  - Genus: Lariscus
    - Three-striped ground squirrel, Lariscus insignis LC
    - Niobe ground squirrel, Lariscus niobe DD
    - Mentawai three-striped squirrel, Lariscus obscurus NT
  - Genus: Petaurista
    - Spotted giant flying squirrel, Petaurista elegans LC
  - Genus: Petinomys
    - Whiskered flying squirrel, Petinomys genibarbis VU
    - Hagen's flying squirrel, Petinomys hageni DD
    - Siberut flying squirrel, Petinomys lugens VU
    - Arrow flying squirrel, Petinomys sagitta DD
    - Temminck's flying squirrel, Petinomys setosus VU
    - Vordermann's flying squirrel, Petinomys vordermanni VU
  - Genus: Prosciurillus
    - Secretive dwarf squirrel, Prosciurillus abstrusus DD
    - Whitish dwarf squirrel, Prosciurillus leucomus LC
    - Celebes dwarf squirrel, Prosciurillus murinus LC
    - Sanghir squirrel, Prosciurillus rosenbergii LC
    - Weber's dwarf squirrel, Prosciurillus weberi EN
  - Genus: Pteromyscus
    - Smoky flying squirrel, Pteromyscus pulverulentus EN
  - Genus: Ratufa
    - Cream-coloured giant squirrel, Ratufa affinis NT
    - Black giant squirrel, Ratufa bicolor NT
  - Genus: Rheithrosciurus
    - Tufted ground squirrel, Rheithrosciurus macrotis VU
  - Genus: Rhinosciurus
    - Shrew-faced squirrel, Rhinosciurus laticaudatus NT
  - Genus: Rubrisciurus
    - Red-bellied squirrel, Rubrisciurus rubriventer VU
  - Genus: Sundasciurus
    - Brooke's squirrel, Sundasciurus brookei LC
    - Fraternal squirrel, Sundasciurus fraterculus VU
    - Horse-tailed squirrel, Sundasciurus hippurus NT
    - Jentink's squirrel, Sundasciurus jentinki LC
    - Low's squirrel, Sundasciurus lowii LC
    - Slender squirrel, Sundasciurus tenuis LC
- Family Spalacidae
  - Genus: Rhizomys
    - Large bamboo rat, Rhizomys sumatrensis LC
- Family Muridae
  - Genus: Anisomys
    - Squirrel-toothed rat, Anisomys imitator LC
  - Genus: Baiyankamys
    - Mountain water rat, Baiyankamys habbema DD
  - Genus: Bandicota
    - Lesser bandicoot rat, Bandicota bengalensis LC
    - Greater bandicoot rat, Bandicota indica LC
  - Genus: Berylmys
    - Bower's white-toothed rat, Berylmys bowersi LC
  - Genus: Bunomys
    - Andrew's hill rat, Bunomys andrewsi LC
    - Yellow-haired hill rat, Bunomys chrysocomus LC
    - Heavenly hill rat, Bunomys coelestis EN
    - Fraternal hill rat, Bunomys fratrorum VU
    - Inland hill rat, Bunomys penitus LC
    - Long-headed hill rat, Bunomys prolatus EN
  - Genus: Chiropodomys
    - Indomalayan pencil-tailed tree mouse, Chiropodomys gliroides LC
    - Koopman's pencil-tailed tree mouse, Chiropodomys karlkoopmani VU
    - Gray-bellied pencil-tailed tree mouse, Chiropodomys muroides DD
    - Small pencil-tailed tree mouse, Chiropodomys pusillus DD
  - Genus: Coccymys
    - White-toothed brush mouse, Coccymys albidens DD
    - Rümmler's brush mouse, Coccymys ruemmleri LC
  - Genus: Coryphomys
    - Buhler's coryphomys, Coryphomys buehleri EX
  - Genus: Echiothrix
    - Central Sulawesi echiothrix, Echiothrix centrosa NT
    - Northern Sulawesi echiothrix, Echiothrix leucura EN
  - Genus: Eropeplus
    - Sulawesi soft-furred rat, Eropeplus canus VU
  - Genus: Haeromys
    - Ranee mouse, Haeromys margarettae DD
    - Minahassa ranee mouse, Haeromys minahassae NT
    - Lesser ranee mouse, Haeromys pusillus VU
  - Genus: Hydromys
    - Rakali, Hydromys chrysogaster LC
    - Western water rat, Hydromys hussoni DD
  - Genus: Hyomys
    - Western white-eared giant rat, Hyomys dammermani DD
  - Genus: Kadarsanomys
    - Sody's tree rat, Kadarsanomys sodyi EN
  - Genus: Komodomys
    - Komodo rat, Komodomys rintjanus VU
  - Genus: Lenomys
    - Trefoil-toothed giant rat, Lenomys meyeri LC
  - Genus: Lenothrix
    - Gray tree rat, Lenothrix canus LC
  - Genus: Leopoldamys
    - Sundaic mountain leopoldamys, Leopoldamys ciliatus LC
    - Diwangkara's long-tailed giant rat, Leopoldamys diwangkarai DD
    - Long-tailed giant rat, Leopoldamys sabanus LC
    - Mentawai long-tailed giant rat, Leopoldamys siporanus VU
  - Genus: Lorentzimys
    - New Guinean jumping mouse, Lorentzimys nouhuysi LC
  - Genus: Mallomys
    - De Vis's woolly rat, Mallomys aroaensis LC
    - Alpine woolly rat, Mallomys gunung EN
    - Subalpine woolly rat, Mallomys istapantap LC
    - Rothschild's woolly rat, Mallomys rothschildi LC
  - Genus: Mammelomys
    - Large-scaled mosaic-tailed rat, Mammelomys lanosus LC
    - Large mosaic-tailed rat, Mammelomys rattoides LC
  - Genus: Margaretamys
    - Beccari's margareta rat, Margaretamys beccarii DD
    - Elegant margareta rat, Margaretamys elegans NT
    - Little margareta rat, Margaretamys parvus DD
    - Christine's margareta rat, Margaretamys christinae
  - Genus: Maxomys
    - Bartels's spiny rat, Maxomys bartelsii LC
    - Dollman's spiny rat, Maxomys dollmani DD
    - Hellwald's spiny rat, Maxomys hellwaldii LC
    - Sumatran spiny rat, Maxomys hylomyoides DD
    - Musschenbroek's spiny rat, Maxomys musschenbroekii LC
    - Fat-nosed spiny rat, Maxomys inflatus VU
    - Chestnut-bellied spiny rat, Maxomys ochraceiventer DD
    - Pagai spiny rat, Maxomys pagensis VU
    - Rajah spiny rat, Maxomys rajah VU
    - Red spiny rat, Maxomys surifer LC
    - Watts's spiny rat, Maxomys wattsi EN
    - Whitehead's spiny rat, Maxomys whiteheadi VU
  - Genus: Melasmothrix
    - Sulawesian shrew rat, Melasmothrix naso DD
  - Genus: Melomys
    - Dusky mosaic-tailed rat, Melomys aerosus EN
    - Bannister's rat, Melomys bannisteri EN
    - Yamdena mosaic-tailed rat, Melomys cooperae DD
    - Manusela mosaic-tailed rat, Melomys fraterculus EN
    - Snow Mountains grassland mosaic-tailed rat, Melomys frigicola LC
    - Seram long-tailed mosaic-tailed rat, Melomys fulgens DD
    - Riama mosaic-tailed rat, Melomys howi DD
    - White-bellied mosaic-tailed rat, Melomys leucogaster LC
    - Papua grassland mosaic-tailed rat, Melomys lutillus LC
    - Obi mosaic-tailed rat, Melomys obiensis LC
    - Pavel's Seram mosaic-tailed rat, Melomys paveli DD
    - Black-tailed mosaic-tailed rat, Melomys rufescens LC
    - Short-tailed Talaud mosaic-tailed rat, Melomys caurinus EN
    - Long-tailed Talaud mosaic-tailed rat, Melomys talaudium EN
  - Genus: Microhydromys
    - Northern groove-toothed shrew mouse, Microhydromys richardsoni DD
  - Genus: Mus
    - Ryukyu mouse, Mus caroli LC
    - Fawn-colored mouse, Mus cervicolor LC
    - Sumatran shrewlike mouse, Mus crociduroides DD
    - House mouse, M. musculus LC
    - Earth-colored mouse, Mus terricolor LC
    - Volcano mouse, Mus vulcani LC
  - Genus: Nesoromys
    - Ceram rat, Nesoromys ceramicus EN
  - Genus: Niviventer
    - Dark-tailed tree rat, Niviventer cremoriventer LC
    - Montane Sumatran white-bellied rat, Niviventer fraternus LC
    - Chestnut white-bellied rat, Niviventer fulvescens LC
    - Narrow-tailed white-bellied rat, Niviventer lepturus LC
    - Long-tailed mountain rat, Niviventer rapit LC
  - Genus: Papagomys
    - Flores giant rat, Papagomys armandvillei NT
    - Verhoeven's giant tree rat, Papagomys theodorverhoeveni EX
  - Genus: Parahydromys
    - New Guinea waterside rat, Parahydromys asper LC
  - Genus: Paraleptomys,
    - Northern water rat, Paraleptomys rufilatus EN
    - Short-haired water rat, Paraleptomys wilhelmina DD
  - Genus: Paramelomys
    - Lorentz's mosaic-tailed rat, Paramelomys lorentzii LC
    - Thomas's mosaic-tailed rat, Paramelomys mollis LC
    - Long-nosed paramelomys, Paramelomys naso LC
    - Lowland mosaic-tailed rat, Paramelomys platyops LC
    - Mountain mosaic-tailed rat, Paramelomys rubex LC
    - Stein's paramelomys, Paramelomys steini DD
  - Genus: Paruromys
    - Sulawesi giant rat, Paruromys dominator LC
  - Genus: Paulamys
    - Flores long-nosed rat, Paulamys naso EN
  - Genus: Pithecheir
    - Red tree rat, Pithecheir melanurus VU
  - Genus: Pithecheirops
    - Bornean pithecheirops, Pithecheirops otion DD
  - Genus: Pogonomelomys
    - Grey pogonomelomys, Pogonomelomys brassi LC
    - Lowland brush mouse, Pogonomelomys bruijni LC
    - Shaw Mayer's brush mouse, Pogonomelomys mayeri LC
  - Genus: Pogonomys
    - Large tree mouse, Pogonomys loriae LC
    - Chestnut tree mouse, Pogonomys macrourus LC
    - Gray-bellied tree mouse, Pogonomys sylvestris LC
  - Genus: Pseudohydromys
    - One-toothed shrew mouse, Pseudohydromys ellermani LC
    - Western shrew mouse, Pseudohydromys occidentalis DD
  - Genus: Rattus
    - Sunburned rat, Rattus adustus DD
    - Annandale's rat, Rattus annandalei LC
    - Vogelkop mountain rat, Rattus arfakiensis DD
    - Ricefield rat, Rattus argentiventer LC
    - Western New Guinea mountain rat, Rattus arrogans LC
    - Aceh rat, Rattus blangorum DD
    - Bonthain rat, Rattus bontanus DD
    - Sula rat, Rattus elaphinus NT
    - Enggano rat, Rattus enganus DD
    - Polynesian rat, Rattus exulans LC
    - Spiny Ceram rat, Rattus feliceus NT
    - Hainald's rat, Rattus hainaldi EN
    - Hoffmann's rat, Rattus hoffmanni LC
    - Hoogerwerf's rat, Rattus hoogerwerfi VU
    - Japen rat, Rattus jobiensis LC
    - Koopman's rat, Rattus koopmani DD
    - Korinch's rat, Rattus korinchi DD
    - Mentawai rat, Rattus lugens VU
    - Opossum rat, Rattus marmosurus LC
    - Little soft-furred rat, Rattus mollicomulus LC
    - Molaccan prehensile-tailed rat, Rattus morotaiensis LC
    - Himalayan field rat, Rattus nitidus LC
    - Brown rat, R. norvegicus LC introduced
    - Arianus's rat, Rattus omichlodes DD
    - Peleng rat, Rattus pelurus DD
    - Large New Guinea spiny rat, Rattus praetor LC
    - Black rat, Rattus rattus LC
    - Glacier rat, Rattus richardsoni VU
    - Southeastern xanthurus rat, Rattus salocco DD
    - Simalur rat, Rattus simalurensis EN
    - Stein's rat, Rattus steini LC
    - Tanezumi rat, Rattus tanezumi LC
    - Timor rat, Rattus timorensis DD
    - Malayan field rat, Rattus tiomanicus LC
    - Slender rat, Rattus verecundus LC
    - Yellow-tailed rat, Rattus xanthurus NT
  - Genus: Sommeromys
    - Sommer's Sulawesi rat, Sommeromys macrorhinos DD
  - Genus: Spelaeomys
    - Flores cave rat, Spelaeomys florensis EX
  - Genus: Sundamys
    - Mountain giant Sunda rat, Sundamys infraluteus LC
    - Bartels's rat, Sundamys maxi VU
    - Müller's giant Sunda rat, Sundamys muelleri LC
  - Genus: Taeromys
    - Salokko rat, Taeromys arcuatus LC
    - Lovely-haired rat, Taeromys callitrichus DD
    - Celebes rat, Taeromys celebensis LC
    - Sulawesi montane rat, Taeromys hamatus DD
    - Small-eared rat, Taeromys microbullatus DD
    - Sulawesi forest rat, Taeromys punicans DD
    - Tondano rat, Taeromys taerae VU
  - Genus: Tateomys
    - Long-tailed shrew rat, Tateomys macrocercus DD
    - Tate's shrew rat, Tateomys rhinogradoides DD
  - Genus: Uromys
    - Giant naked-tailed rat, Uromys anak LC
    - Biak giant rat, Uromys boeadii CR
    - Giant white-tailed rat, Uromys caudimaculatus LC
    - Emma's giant rat, Uromys emmae CR
    - Great Key Island giant rat, Uromys siebersi DD
  - Genus: Xenuromys
    - Mimic tree rat, Xenuromys barbatus LC

=== Order: Lagomorpha (lagomorphs) ===
The lagomorphs comprise two families, Leporidae (hares and rabbits), and Ochotonidae (pikas). Though they can resemble rodents, and were classified as a superfamily in that order until the early 20th century, they have since been considered a separate order. They differ from rodents in a number of physical characteristics, such as having four incisors in the upper jaw rather than two.

- Family Leporidae
  - Genus: Lepus
    - Indian hare, L. nigricollis LC possibly introduced
  - Genus: Nesolagus
    - Sumatran striped rabbit, Nesolagus netscheri DD

=== Order Eulipotyphla (shrews, moles, and hedgehogs) ===
The "shrew-forms" are insectivorous mammals. The shrews and solenodons closely resemble mice while the moles are stout-bodied burrowers. The hedgehogs are easily recognised by their spines while gymnures look more like large rats.

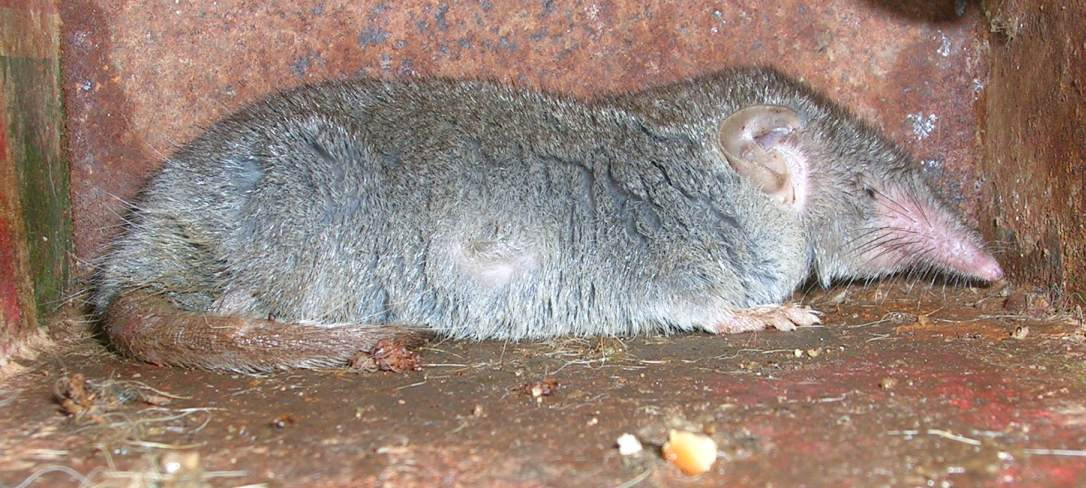
Asian house shrew

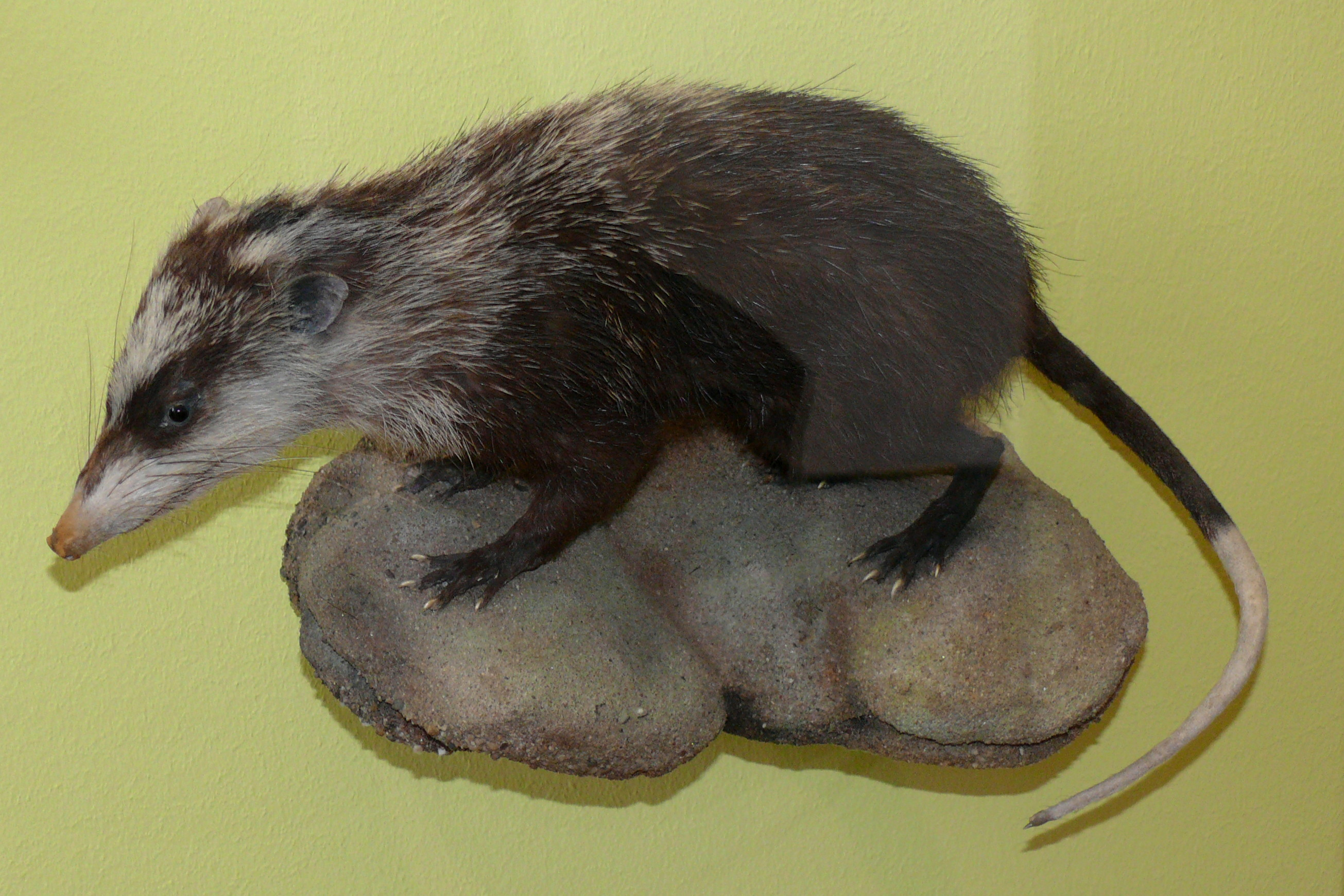
Moonrat

- Family: Erinaceidae
  - Genus: Echinosorex
    - Moonrat, Echinosorex gymnura LC
  - Genus: Hylomys
    - Dwarf gymnure, Hylomys parvus VU
    - Bornean short-tailed gymnure, Hylomys dorsalis
    - Max's short-tailed gymnure, Hylomys maxi
    - Javan short-tailed gymnure, Hylomys suillus LC
    - Leuser gymnure, Hylomys vorax
- Family: Soricidae (shrews)
  - Genus: Chimarrogale
    - Bornean water shrew, Chimarrogale phaeura EN
    - Sumatran water shrew, Chimarrogale sumatrana DD
  - Genus: Crocidura
    - Kinabalu shrew, Crocidura baluensis LC
    - Batak shrew, Crocidura batakorum
    - Beccari's shrew, Crocidura beccarii LC
    - Thick-tailed shrew, Crocidura brunnea LC
    - Elongated shrew, Crocidura elongata LC
    - Bornean shrew, Crocidura foetida LC
    - Hill's shrew, Crocidura hilliana DD
    - Hutan shrew, Crocidura hutanis LC
    - Jenkins' shrew, Crocidura jenkinsi CR
    - Sulawesi shrew, Crocidura lea LC
    - Sumatran giant shrew, Crocidura lepidura LC
    - Sulawesi tiny shrew, Crocidura levicula LC
    - Malayan shrew, Crocidura malayana LC
    - Javanese shrew, Crocidura maxi LC
    - Sunda shrew, Crocidura monticola LC
    - Mossy forest shrew, Crocidura musseri DD
    - Peninsular shrew, Crocidura negligens LC
    - Black-footed shrew, Crocidura nigripes LC
    - Oriental shrew, Crocidura orientalis LC
    - Sumatran long-tailed shrew, Crocidura paradoxura LC
    - Sulawesi white-handed shrew, Crocidura rhoditis LC
    - Timor shrew, Crocidura tenuis DD
    - Banka shrew, Crocidura vosmaeri DD
  - Genus: Suncus
    - Flores shrew, Suncus mertensi EN
    - Asian house shrew, S. murinus LC

=== Order: Chiroptera (bats) ===
The bats' most distinguishing feature is that their forelimbs are developed as wings, making them the only mammals capable of flight. Bat species account for about 20% of all mammals.

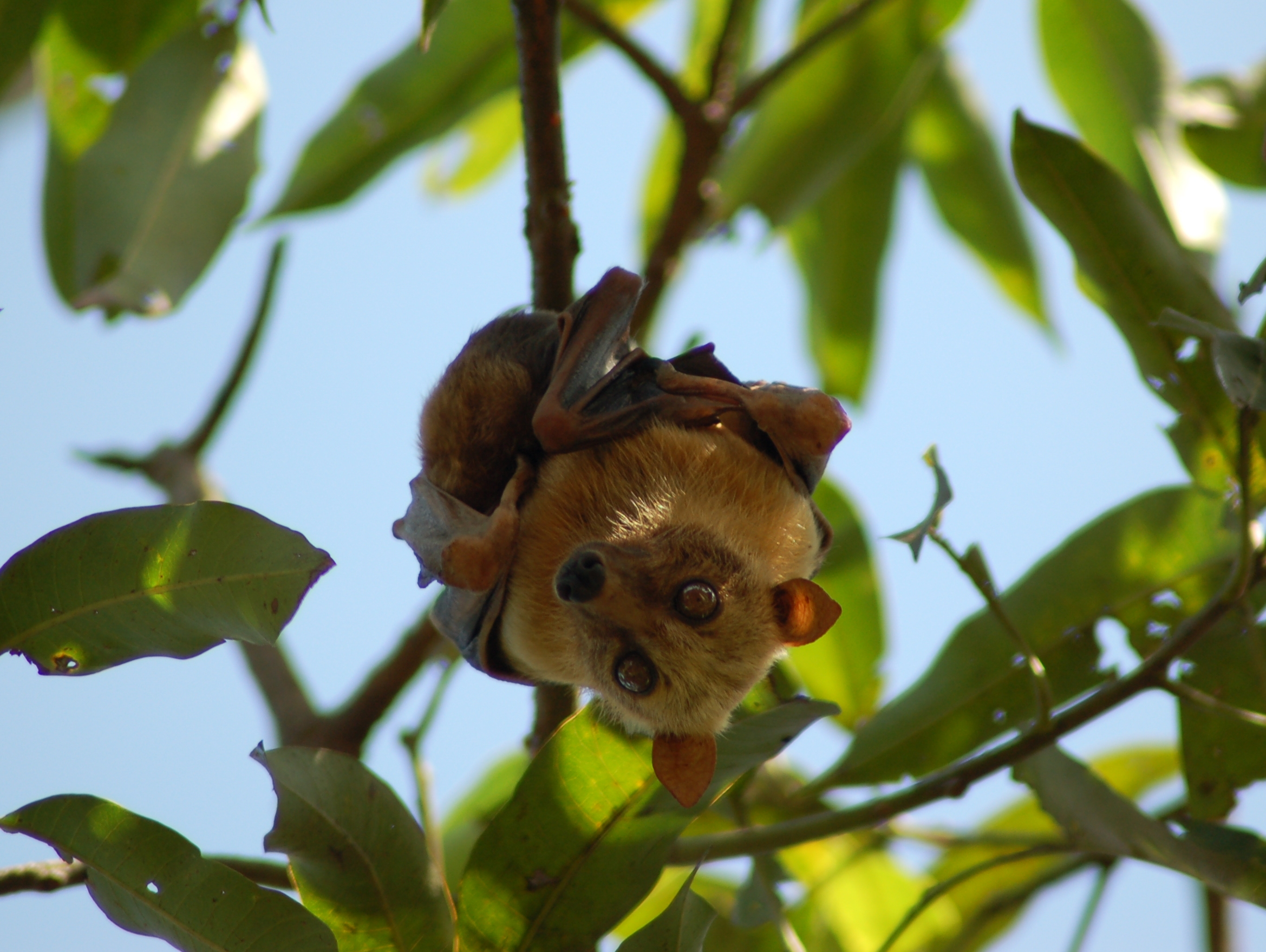
Sulawesi flying fox

- Family: Pteropodidae (megabats)
  - Genus: Acerodon
    - Sulawesi flying fox, Acerodon celebensis VU
    - Talaud flying fox, Acerodon humilis EN
    - Sunda flying fox, Acerodon mackloti VU
  - Genus: Aethalops
    - Borneo fruit bat, Aethalops aequalis LC
    - Pygmy fruit bat, Aethalops alecto LC
  - Genus: Aproteles
    - Bulmer's fruit bat, Aproteles bulmerae CR
  - Genus: Balionycteris
    - Spotted-winged fruit bat, Balionycteris maculata LC
  - Genus: Chironax
    - Black-capped fruit bat, Chironax melanocephalus LC
  - Genus: Cynopterus
    - Lesser short-nosed fruit bat, C. brachyotis LC
    - Horsfield's fruit bat, Cynopterus horsfieldi LC
    - Peters's fruit bat, Cynopterus luzoniensis LC
    - Minute fruit bat, Cynopterus minutus LC
    - Nusatenggara short-nosed fruit bat, Cynopterus nusatenggara LC
    - Greater short-nosed fruit bat, Cynopterus sphinx LC
    - Indonesian short-nosed fruit bat, Cynopterus titthaecheileus LC
  - Genus: Dobsonia
    - Beaufort's naked-backed fruit bat, Dobsonia beauforti LC
    - Halmahera naked-backed fruit bat, Dobsonia crenulata LC
    - Biak naked-backed fruit bat, Dobsonia emersa VU
    - Sulawesi naked-backed fruit bat, Dobsonia exoleta LC
    - Lesser naked-backed fruit bat, Dobsonia minor LC
    - Moluccan naked-backed fruit bat, Dobsonia moluccensis LC
    - Western naked-backed fruit bat, Dobsonia peronii LC
    - Greenish naked-backed fruit bat, Dobsonia viridis LC
  - Genus: Dyacopterus
    - Brooks's dyak fruit bat, Dyacopterus brooksi VU
    - Dayak fruit bat, Dyacopterus spadiceus NT
  - Genus: Eonycteris
    - Greater nectar bat, Eonycteris major NT
    - Cave nectar bat, Eonycteris spelaea LC
  - Genus: Harpyionycteris
    - Sulawesi harpy fruit bat, Harpyionycteris celebensis NT
  - Genus: Macroglossus
    - Long-tongued nectar bat, Macroglossus minimus LC
    - Long-tongued fruit bat, Macroglossus sobrinus LC
  - Genus: Megaerops
    - Tailless fruit bat, Megaerops ecaudatus LC
    - Javan tailless fruit bat, Megaerops kusnotoi VU
    - White-collared fruit bat, Megaerops wetmorei VU
  - Genus: Neopteryx
    - Small-toothed fruit bat, Neopteryx frosti EN
  - Genus: Nyctimene
    - Broad-striped tube-nosed fruit bat, Nyctimene aello LC
    - Common tube-nosed fruit bat, Nyctimene albiventer LC
    - Pallas's tube-nosed bat, Nyctimene cephalotes LC
    - Mountain tube-nosed fruit bat, Nyctimene certans LC
    - Round-eared tube-nosed fruit bat, Nyctimene cyclotis DD
    - Dragon tube-nosed fruit bat, Nyctimene draconilla DD
    - Keast's tube-nosed fruit bat, Nyctimene keasti NT
    - Lesser tube-nosed bat, Nyctimene minutus VU
  - Genus: Paranyctimene
    - Lesser tube-nosed fruit bat, Paranyctimene raptor LC
    - Steadfast tube-nosed fruit bat, Paranyctimene tenax LC
  - Genus: Penthetor
    - Dusky fruit bat, Penthetor lucasi LC
  - Genus: Pteropus
    - Black flying fox, Pteropus alecto LC
    - Aru flying fox, Pteropus aruensis CR
    - Ashy-headed flying fox, Pteropus caniceps VU
    - Moluccan flying fox, Pteropus chrysoproctus VU
    - Spectacled flying fox, Pteropus conspicillatus EN
    - Gray flying fox, Pteropus griseus VU
    - Small flying fox, Pteropus hypomelanus NT
    - Kei flying fox, Pteropus keyensis DD
    - Lombok flying fox, Pteropus lombocensis DD
    - Big-eared flying fox, Pteropus macrotis LC
    - Black-bearded flying fox, Pteropus melanopogon EN
    - Black-eared flying fox, Pteropus melanotus VU
    - Great flying fox, Pteropus neohibernicus LC
    - Ceram fruit bat, Pteropus ocularis VU
    - Masked flying fox, Pteropus personatus LC
    - Geelvink Bay flying fox, Pteropus pohlei VU
    - Philippine gray flying fox, Pteropus speciosus DD
    - Temminck's flying fox, Pteropus temmincki DD
    - Large flying fox, Pteropus vampyrus EN
  - Genus: Rousettus
    - Geoffroy's rousette, Rousettus amplexicaudatus LC
    - Manado fruit bat, Rousettus bidens VU
    - Sulawesi rousette, Rousettus celebensis LC
    - Leschenault's rousette, Rousettus leschenaulti NT
    - Linduan rousette, Rousettus linduensis DD
    - Bare-backed rousette, Rousettus spinalatus VU
  - Genus: Styloctenium
    - Sulawesi stripe-faced fruit batStyloctenium wallacei NT
  - Genus: Syconycteris
    - Common blossom bat, Syconycteris australis LC
    - Halmahera blossom bat, Syconycteris carolinae NT
    - Moss-forest blossom bat, Syconycteris hobbit LC
  - Genus: Thoopterus
    - Swift fruit bat, Thoopterus nigrescens LC
- Family Rhinopomatidae
  - Genus: Rhinopoma
    - Greater mouse-tailed bat, Rhinopoma microphyllum
- Family Megadermatidae (false vampire bats)
  - Genus: Megaderma
    - Lesser false vampire bat, Megaderma spasma
- Family Rhinolophidae (horseshoe bats)
  - Genus: Rhinolophus
    - Acuminate horseshoe bat, Rhinolophus acuminatus
    - Intermediate horseshoe bat, Rhinolophus affinis
    - Arcuate horseshoe bat, Rhinolophus arcuatus
    - Bornean horseshoe bat, Rhinolophus borneensis
    - Canut's horseshoe bat, Rhinolophus canuti
    - Sulawesi horseshoe bat, Rhinolophus celebensis
    - Creagh's horseshoe bat, Rhinolophus creaghi
    - Broad-eared horseshoe bat, Rhinolophus euryotis
    - Insular horseshoe bat, Rhinolophus keyensis
    - Blyth's horseshoe bat, Rhinolophus lepidus
    - Woolly horseshoe bat, Rhinolophus luctus
    - Big-eared horseshoe bat, Rhinolophus macrotis
    - Madura horseshoe bat, Rhinolophus madurensis
    - Smaller horseshoe bat, Rhinolophus megaphyllus
    - Neriad horseshoe bat, Rhinolophus nereis NT
    - Large-eared horseshoe bat, Rhinolophus philippinensis NT
    - Least horseshoe bat, Rhinolophus pusillus LC
    - Lesser woolly horseshoe bat, Rhinolophus sedulus
    - Lesser brown horseshoe bat, Rhinolophus stheno LC
    - Trefoil horseshoe bat, Rhinolophus trifoliatus LC
- Family Hipposideridae
  - Genus: Aselliscus
    - Temminck's trident bat, Aselliscus tricuspidatus LC
  - Genus: Coelops
    - East Asian tailless leaf-nosed bat, Coelops frithii LC
    - Malayan tailless leaf-nosed bat, Coelops robinsoni VU
  - Genus: Hipposideros
    - Dusky roundleaf bat, Hipposideros ater LC
    - Bicolored roundleaf bat, Hipposideros bicolor LC
    - Short-headed roundleaf bat, Hipposideros breviceps VU
    - Spurred roundleaf bat, Hipposideros calcaratus LC
    - Fawn leaf-nosed bat, Hipposideros cervinus LC
    - Ashy roundleaf bat, Hipposideros cineraceus LC
    - Telefomin roundleaf bat, Hipposideros corynophyllus VU
    - Timor roundleaf bat, Hipposideros crumeniferus DD
    - Diadem leaf-nosed bat, Hipposideros diadema LC
    - Borneo roundleaf bat, Hipposideros doriae NT
    - Dayak roundleaf bat, Hipposideros dyacorum LC
    - Cantor's roundleaf bat, Hipposideros galeritus LC
    - Crested roundleaf bat, Hipposideros inexpectatus
    - Intermediate roundleaf bat, Hipposideros larvatus LC
    - Big-eared roundleaf bat, Hipposideros macrobullatus
    - Maduran leaf-nosed bat, Hipposideros madurae
    - Maggie Taylor's roundleaf bat, Hipposideros maggietaylorae
    - Fly River roundleaf bat, Hipposideros muscinus
    - Orbiculus leaf-nosed bat, Hipposideros orbiculus
    - Biak roundleaf bat, Hipposideros papua
    - Peleng leaf-nosed bat, Hipposideros pelingensis
    - Sorensen's leaf-nosed bat, Hipposideros sorenseni
    - Sumba roundleaf bat, Hipposideros sumbae
    - Wollaston's roundleaf bat, Hipposideros wollastoni
- Family Emballonuridae (sac-winged bats)
  - Genus: Emballonura
    - Small Asian sheath-tailed bat, Emballonura alecto
    - Beccari's sheath-tailed bat, Emballonura beccarii
    - Greater sheath-tailed bat, Emballonura furax
    - Lesser sheath-tailed bat, Emballonura monticola
    - Raffray's sheath-tailed bat, Emballonura raffrayana
  - Genus: Mosia
    - Dark sheath-tailed bat, Mosia nigrescens
  - Genus: Saccolaimus
    - Naked-rumped pouched bat, Saccolaimus saccolaimus
  - Genus: Taphozous
    - Indonesian tomb bat, Taphozous achates
    - Long-winged tomb bat, Taphozous longimanus
    - Black-bearded tomb bat, Taphozous melanopogon
    - Theobald's tomb bat, Taphozous theobaldi
- Family: Nycteridae (slit-faced bats)
  - Genus: Nycteris
    - Javan slit-faced bat, Nycteris javanica
    - Malayan slit-faced bat, Nycteris tragata
- Family: Molossidae (free-tailed bats)
  - Genus: Chaerephon
    - Northern freetail bat, Chaerephon jobensis
    - Northern free-tailed bat, Chaerephon johorensis
  - Genus: Cheiromeles
    - Lesser naked bat, Cheiromeles parvidens
    - Hairless bat, Cheiromeles torquatus
  - Genus: Mops
    - Malayan free-tailed bat, Mops mops
    - Sulawesi free-tailed bat, Mops sarasinorum
  - Genus: Mormopterus
    - Beccari's free-tailed bat, Mormopterus beccarii
    - Sumatran mastiff bat, Mormopterus doriae
  - Genus: Otomops
    - Javan mastiff bat, Otomops formosus
    - Johnstone's mastiff bat, Otomops johnstonei
- Family Vespertilionidae (vesper bats)
  - Genus: Arielulus
    - Black-gilded pipistrelle, Arielulus circumdatus
    - Coppery pipistrelle, Arielulus cuprosus
  - Genus: Falsistrellus
    - Pungent pipistrelle, Falsistrellus mordax
    - Peters's pipistrelle, Falsistrellus petersi
  - Genus: Glischropus
    - Javan thick-thumbed bat, Glischropus javanus
    - Common thick-thumbed bat, Glischropus tylopus
  - Genus: Harpiocephalus
    - Lesser hairy-winged bat, Harpiocephalus harpia
    - Greater hairy-winged bat, Harpiocephalus mordax
  - Genus: Hesperoptenus
    - Blanford's bat, Hesperoptenus blanfordi
    - False serotine bat, Hesperoptenus doriae
    - Gaskell's false serotine, Hesperoptenus gaskelli
    - Large false serotine, Hesperoptenus tomesi
  - Genus: Hypsugo
    - Brown pipistrelle, Hypsugo imbricatus
    - Red-brown pipistrelle, Hypsugo kitcheneri
    - Big-eared pipistrelle, Hypsugo macrotis
    - Vordermann's pipistrelle, Hypsugo vordermanni
  - Genus: Kerivoula
    - Flores woolly bat, Kerivoula flora
    - Hardwicke's woolly bat, Kerivoula hardwickii
    - Small woolly bat, Kerivoula intermedia
    - Papillose woolly bat, Kerivoula papillosa
    - Clear-winged woolly bat, Kerivoula pellucida
    - Painted bat, Kerivoula picta
    - Whitehead's woolly bat, Kerivoula whiteheadi
  - Genus: Miniopterus
    - Little bent-wing bat, Miniopterus australis
    - Miniopterus macrocneme
    - Western bent-winged bat, Miniopterus magnater
    - Intermediate long-fingered bat, Miniopterus medius
    - Philippine long-fingered bat, Miniopterus paululus
    - Small bent-winged bat, Miniopterus pusillus
    - Common bent-wing bat, M. schreibersii VU
    - Shortridges's long-fingered bat, Miniopterus shortridgei
    - Great bent-winged bat, Miniopterus tristis
  - Genus: Murina
    - Bronze tube-nosed bat, Murina aenea
    - Round-eared tube-nosed bat, Murina cyclotis
    - Flute-nosed bat, Murina florium
    - Gilded tube-nosed bat, Murina rozendaali
    - Brown tube-nosed bat, Murina suilla
  - Genus: Myotis
    - Large-footed bat, Myotis adversus
    - Peters's myotis, Myotis ater
    - Hodgson's bat, M. formosus LC
    - Lesser large-footed bat, Myotis hasseltii
    - Herman's myotis, Myotis hermani
    - Horsfield's bat, Myotis horsfieldii
    - Pallid large-footed myotis, Myotis macrotarsus
    - Maluku myotis, Myotis moluccarum
    - Burmese whiskered bat, Myotis montivagus
    - Wall-roosting mouse-eared bat, Myotis muricola
    - Ridley's bat, Myotis ridleyi
    - Himalayan whiskered bat, Myotis siligorensis
    - Kei myotis, Myotis stalkeri
  - Genus: Nyctophilus
    - Sunda long-eared bat, Nyctophilus heran
    - Greater long-eared bat, Nyctophilus timoriensis
  - Genus: Philetor
    - Rohu's bat, Philetor brachypterus
  - Genus: Phoniscus
    - Groove-toothed bat, Phoniscus atrox
    - Peters's trumpet-eared bat, Phoniscus jagorii
    - Golden-tipped bat, Phoniscus papuensis
  - Genus: Pipistrellus
    - Angulate pipistrelle, Pipistrellus angulatus
    - Kelaart's pipistrelle, Pipistrellus ceylonicus
    - Java pipistrelle, Pipistrellus javanicus
    - Minahassa pipistrelle, Pipistrellus minahassae
    - Lesser Papuan pipistrelle, Pipistrellus papuanus
    - Narrow-winged pipistrelle, Pipistrellus stenopterus
    - Least pipistrelle, Pipistrellus tenuis
  - Genus: Scotophilus
    - Sulawesi yellow bat, Scotophilus celebensis
    - Sody's yellow house bat, Scotophilus collinus
    - Lesser Asiatic yellow bat, Scotophilus kuhlii
  - Genus: Scotorepens
    - Northern broad-nosed bat, Scotorepens sanborni
  - Genus: Tylonycteris
    - Lesser bamboo bat, Tylonycteris pachypus
    - Greater bamboo bat, Tylonycteris robustula

=== Order Pholidota (pangolins) ===
The order Pholidota comprises the eight species of pangolin. Pangolins are anteaters and have the powerful claws, elongated snout and long tongue seen in the other unrelated anteater species.

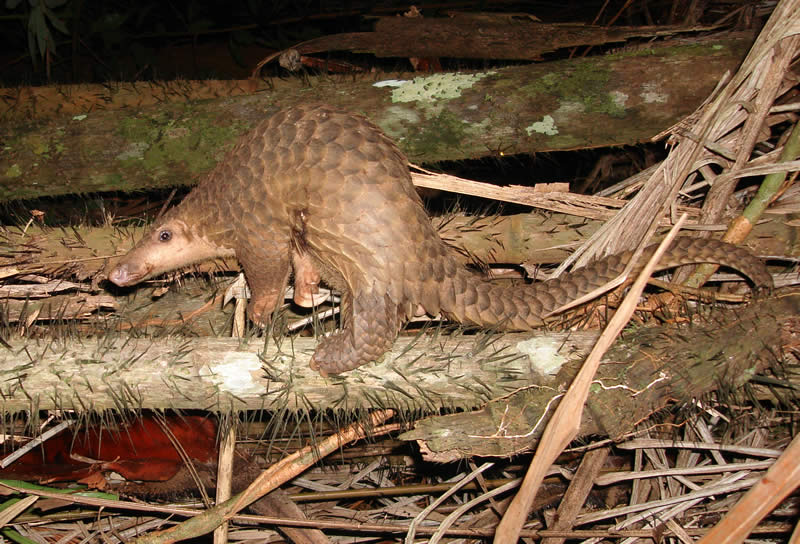
Sunda pangolin

- Family Manidae
  - Genus: Manis
    - Sunda pangolin, M. javanica CR

=== Order: Cetacea (whales) ===
The order Cetacea includes whales, dolphins and porpoises. They are the mammals most fully adapted to aquatic life with a spindle-shaped nearly hairless body, protected by a thick layer of blubber, and forelimbs and tail modified to provide propulsion underwater.

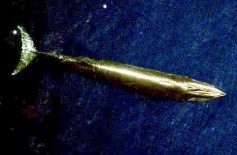
Bryde's whale

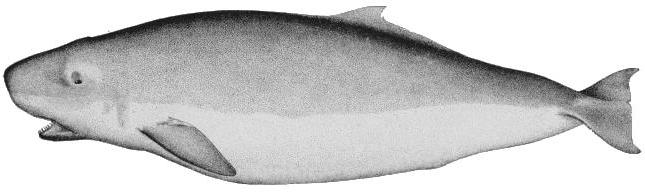
Pygmy sperm whale

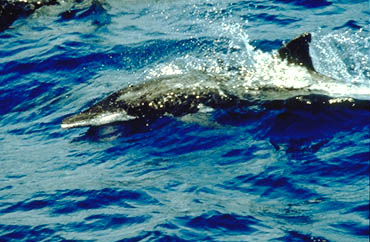
Rough-toothed dolphin

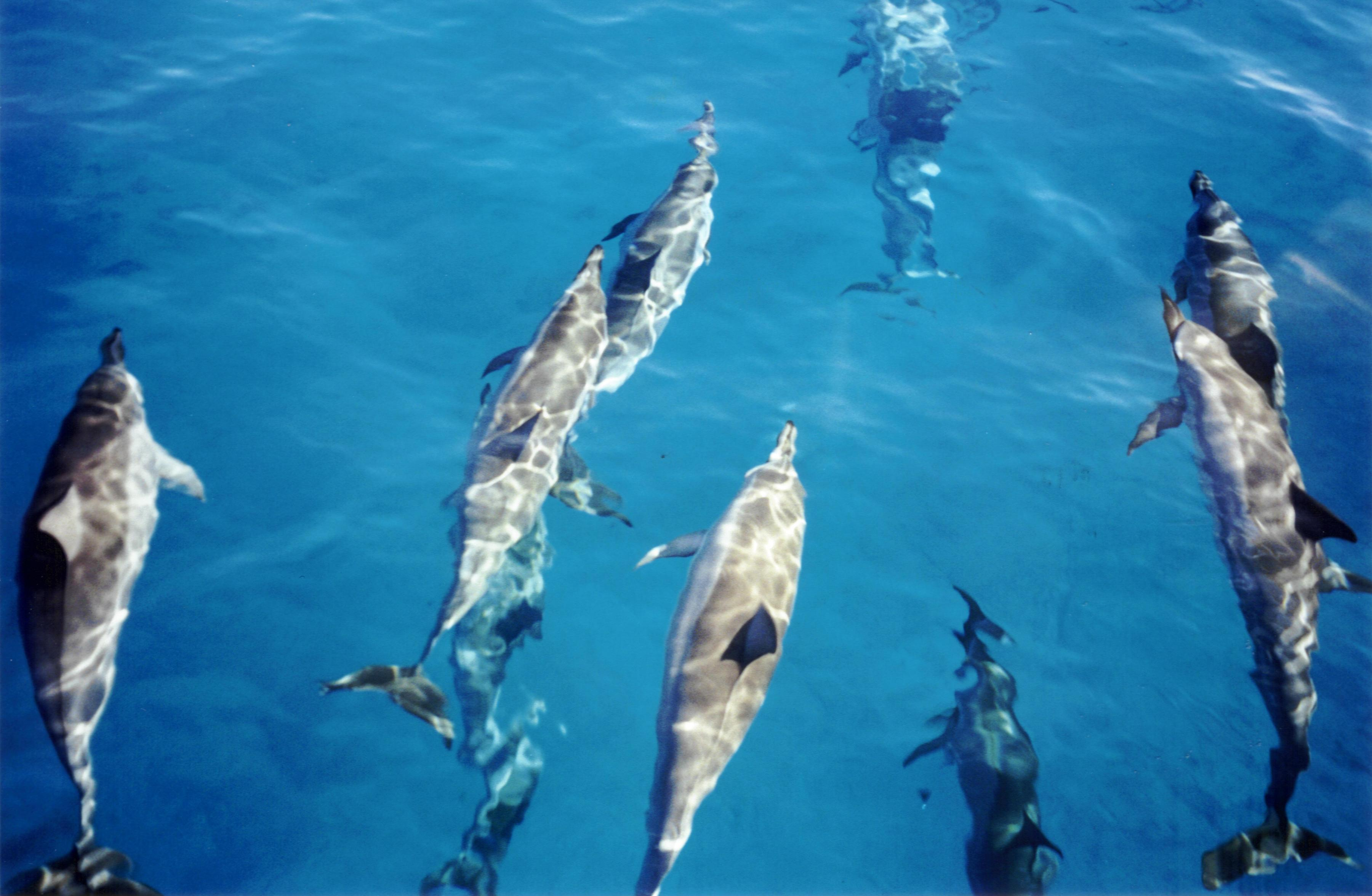
Spinner dolphin

- Family: Balaenopteridae (rorquals)
  - Genus: Balaenoptera
    - Common minke whale, Balaenoptera acutorostrata LC
    - Antarctic minke whale, Balaenoptera bonaerensis NT
    - Sei whale, Balaenoptera borealis EN
    - Bryde's whale, Balaenoptera brydei LC
    - Blue whale, Balaenoptera musculus EN
    - Fin whale, Balaenoptera physalus VU
    - Omura's whale, Balaenoptera omurai DD
  - Genus: Megaptera
    - Humpback whale, Megaptera novaeangliae LC
- Family Physeteridae (sperm whales)
  - Genus: Physeter
    - Sperm whale, Physeter macrocephalus VU
- Family: Kogiidae (small sperm whales)
  - Genus: Kogia
    - Pygmy sperm whale, K. breviceps LC
    - Dwarf sperm whale, Kogia sima LC
- Family: Phocoenidae (porpoises)
  - Genus: Neophocaena
    - Indo-Pacific finless porpoise, Neophocaena phocaenoides VU
- Family Ziphiidae (beaked whales)
  - Genus: Mesoplodon
    - Blainville's beaked whale, Mesoplodon densirostris LC
    - Ginkgo-toothed beaked whale, Mesoplodon ginkgodens DD
  - Genus: Ziphius
    - Cuvier's beaked whaleZiphius cavirostris LC
- Family: Delphinidae (oceanic dolphins)
  - Genus: Delphinus
    - Common dolphin, Delphinus delphis LC
  - Genus: Feresa
    - Pygmy killer whale, Feresa attenuata LC
  - Genus: Globicephala
    - Short-finned pilot whale, Globicephala macrorhynchus LC
  - Genus: Grampus
    - Risso's dolphin, Grampus griseus LC
  - Genus: Lagenodelphis
    - Fraser's dolphin, Lagenodelphis hosei LC
  - Genus: Orcaella
    - Irrawaddy dolphin, O. brevirostris EN
    - Australian snubfin dolphin, Orcaella heinsohni VU
  - Genus: Orcinus
    - Orca, O. orca DD
  - Genus: Peponocephala
    - Melon-headed whale, Peponocephala electra LC
  - Genus: Pseudorca
    - False killer whale, Pseudorca crassidens NT
  - Genus: Sousa
    - Indo-Pacific humpback dolphin, Sousa chinensis VU
  - Genus: Stenella
    - Pantropical spotted dolphin, Stenella attenuata LC
    - Striped dolphin, Stenella coeruleoalba LC
    - Spinner dolphin, Stenella longirostris LC
  - Genus: Steno
    - Rough-toothed dolphin, Steno bredanensis LC
  - Genus: Tursiops
    - Indo-Pacific bottlenose dolphin, Tursiops aduncus NT
    - Common bottlenose dolphin, Tursiops truncatus LC

=== Order: Carnivora (carnivorans) ===
There are over 260 species of carnivorans, the majority of which feed primarily on meat. They have a characteristic skull shape and dentition.

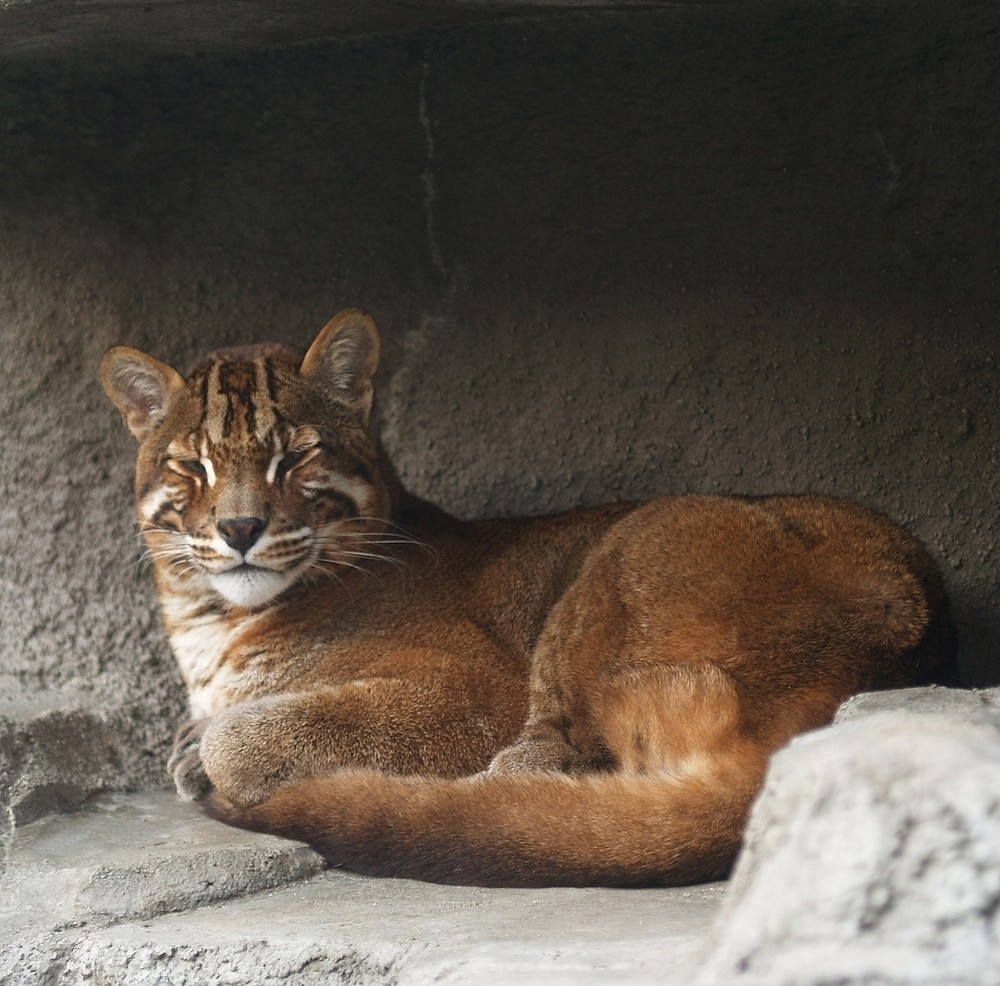
Asian golden cat

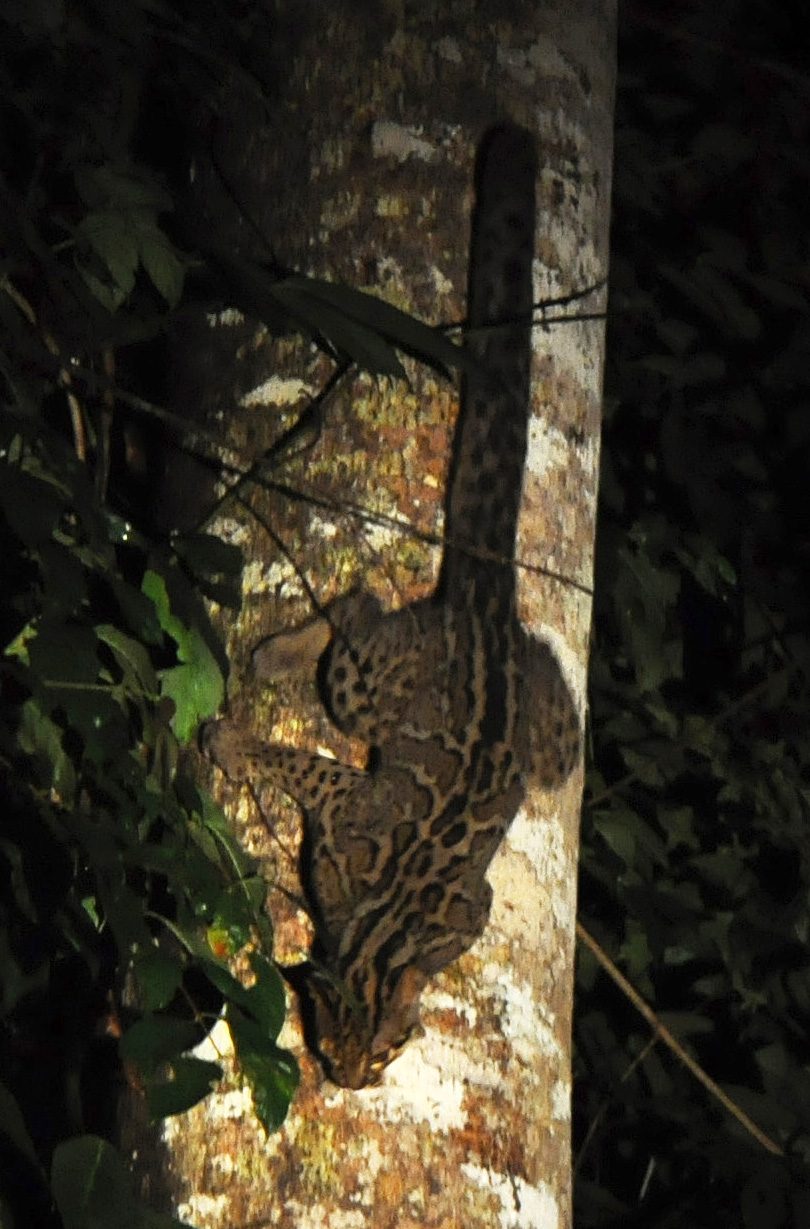
Marbled cat

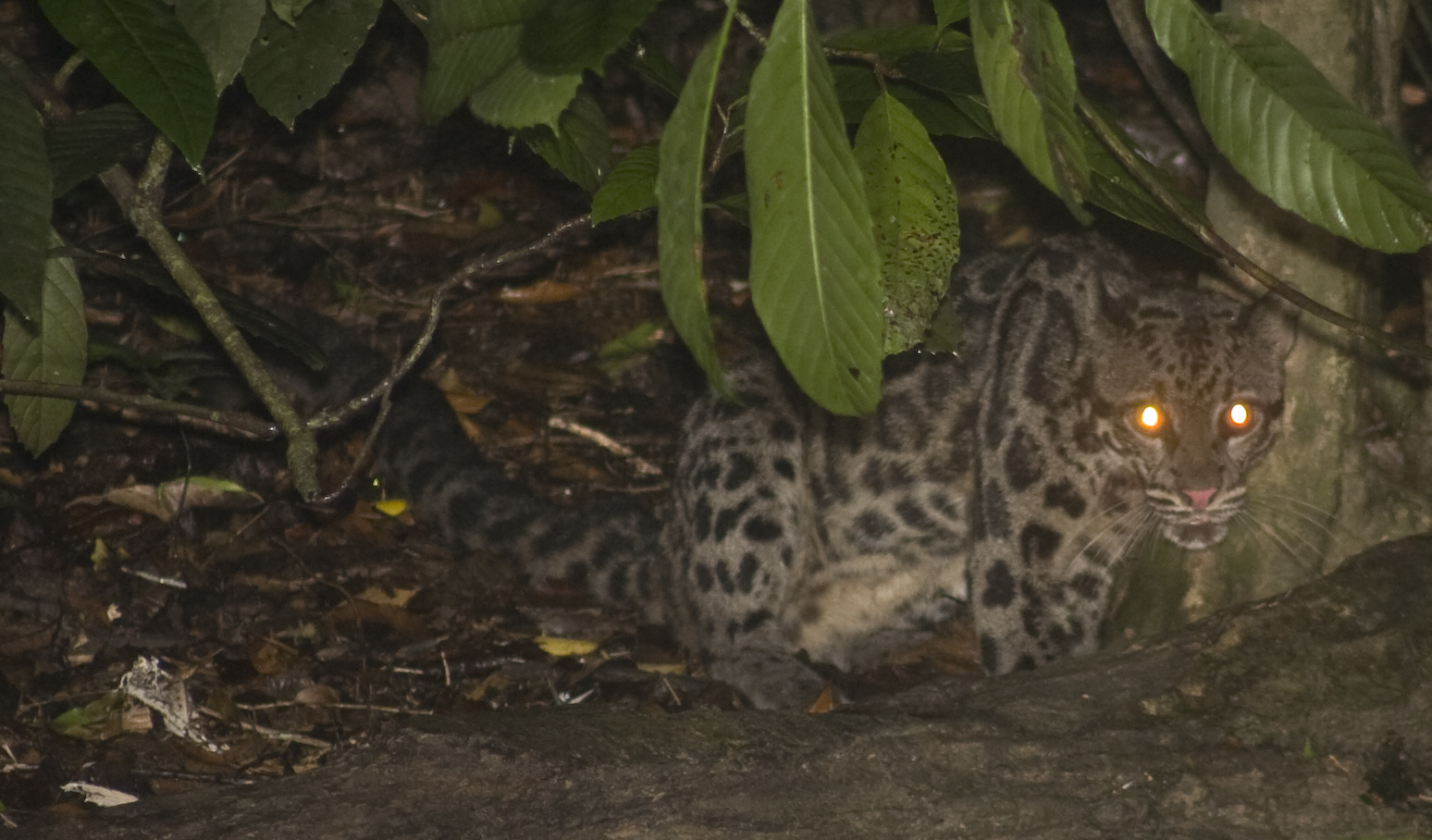
Sunda clouded leopard

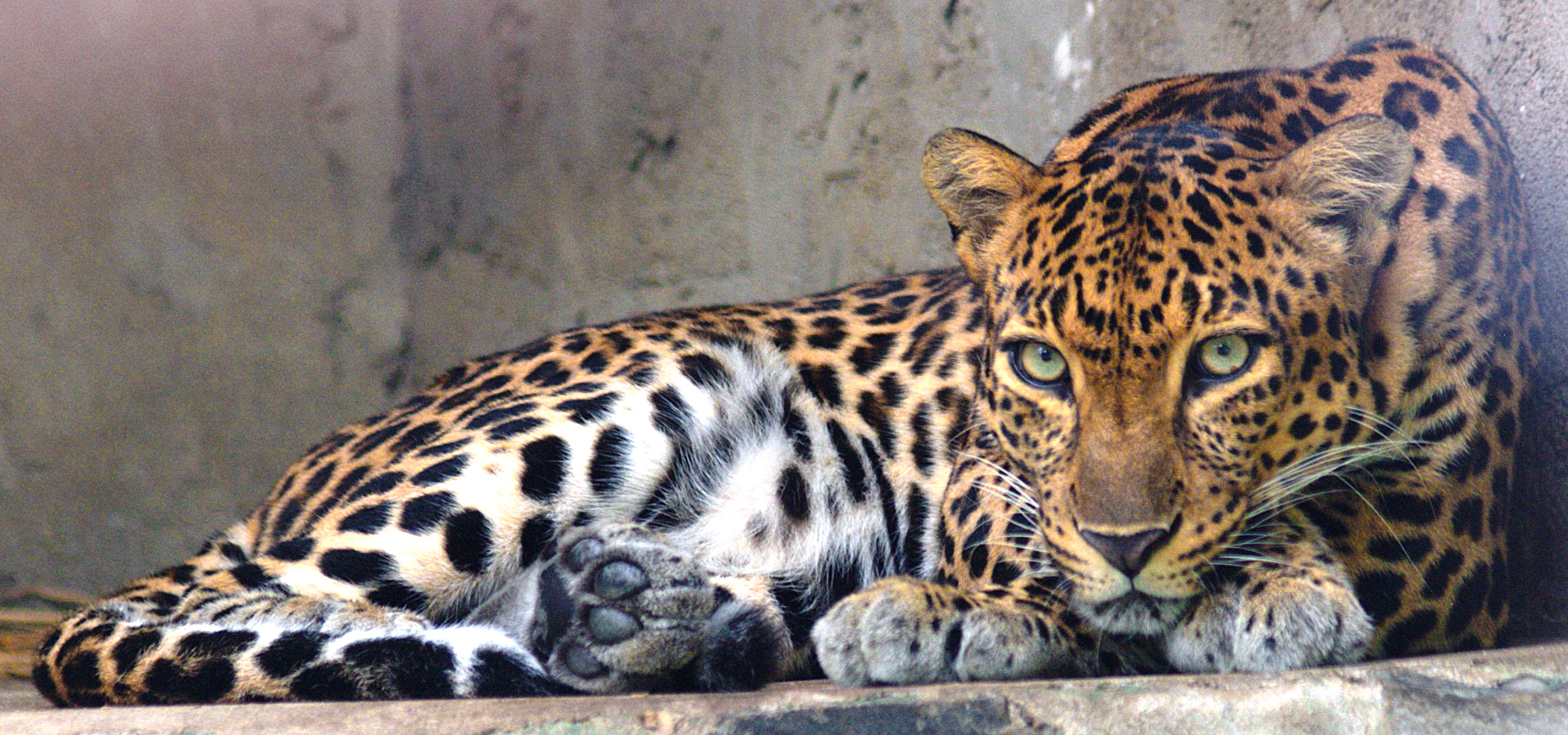
Leopard

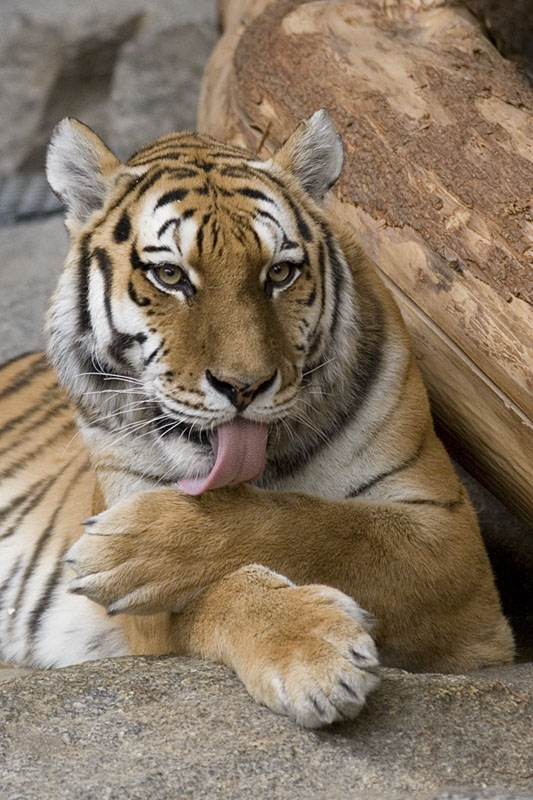
Tiger

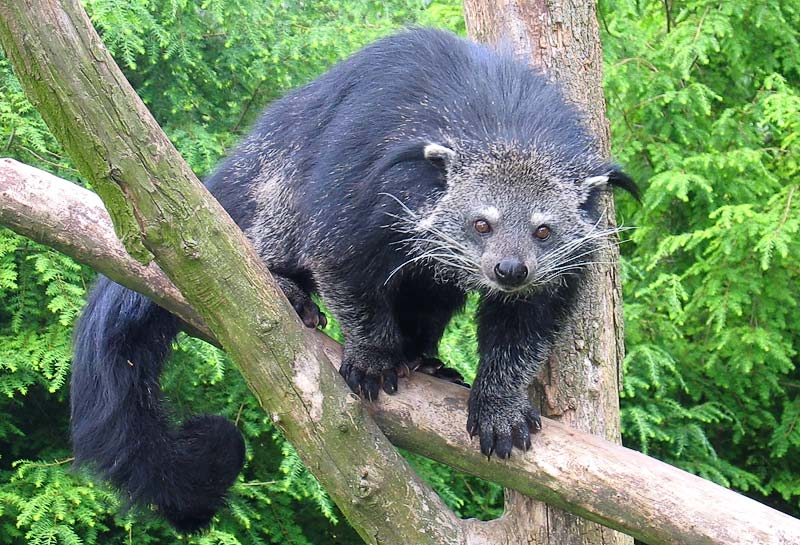
Binturong

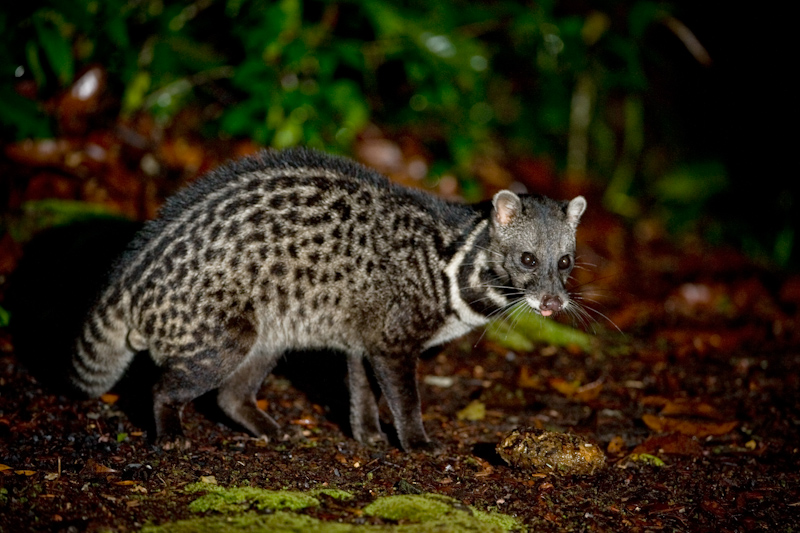
Malay civet

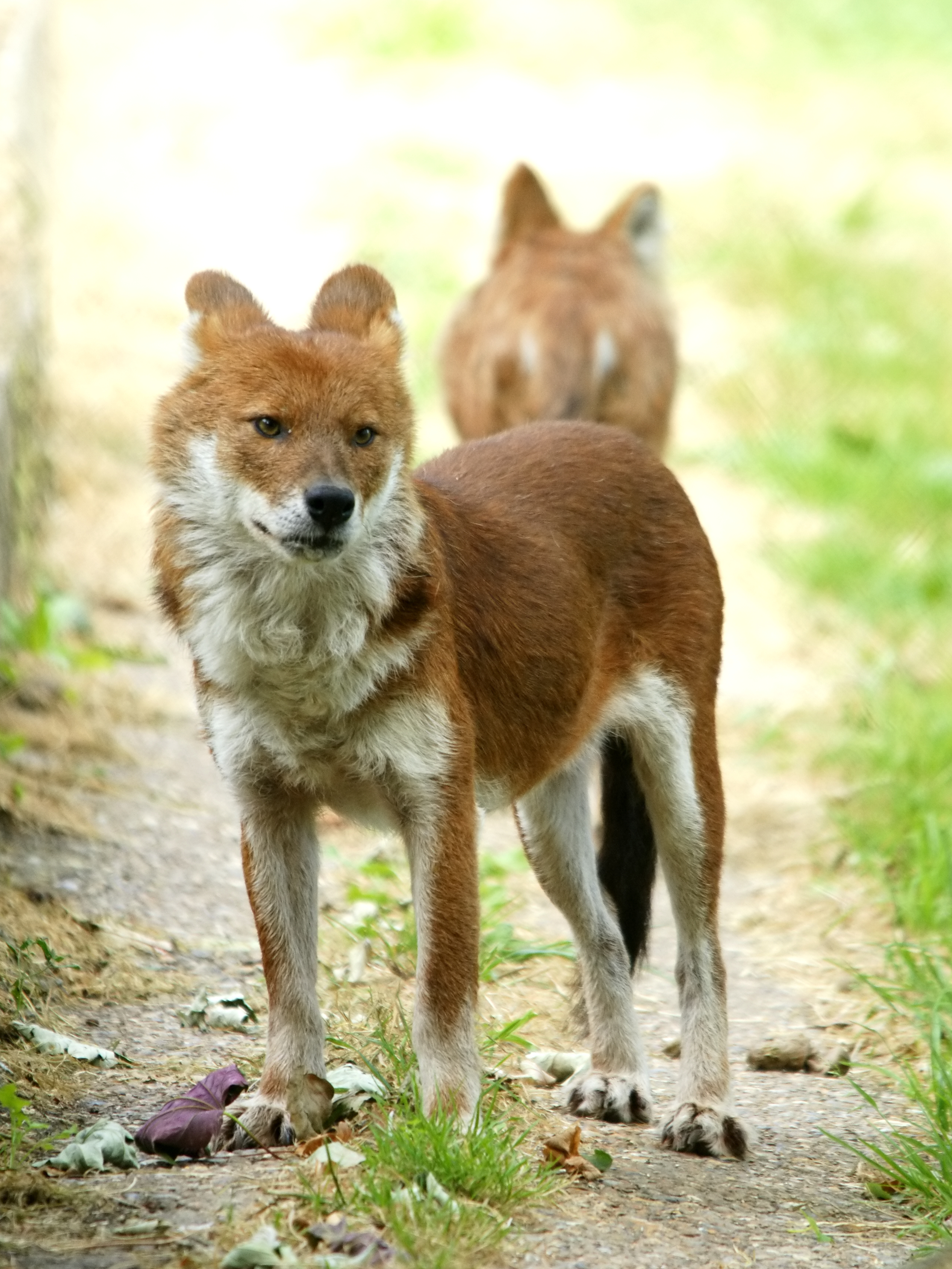
Dhole

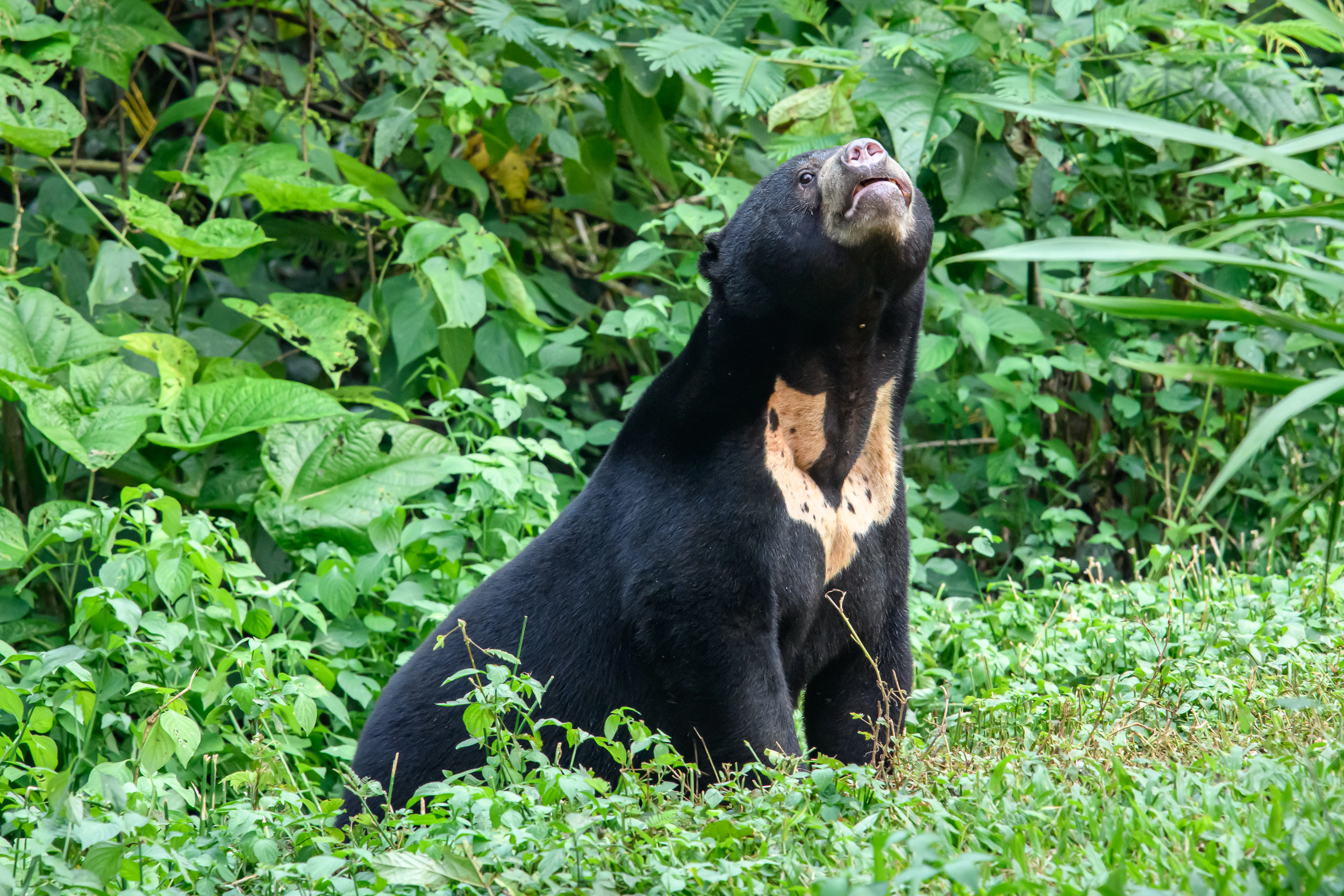
Sun bear

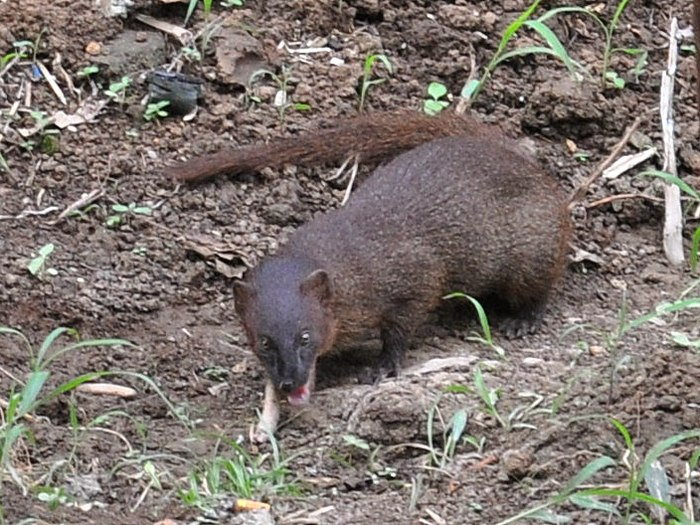
Javan mongoose

- Family Felidae (cats)
  - Genus: Catopuma
    - Bay cat, C. badia EN
    - Asian golden cat, C. temminckii NT
  - Genus: Neofelis
    - Sunda clouded leopard, N. diardi VU
  - Genus: Panthera
    - Leopard, P. pardus VU
      - Javan leopard, P. p. melas EN
    - Tiger, P. tigris EN
      - Bali tiger, P. t. sondaica EX
      - Javan tiger, P. t. sondaica EX
      - Sumatran tiger, P. t. sondaica CR
  - Genus: Pardofelis
    - Marbled cat, P. marmorata NT
  - Genus: Prionailurus
    - Sunda leopard cat, P. javanensis
    - Flat-headed cat, P. planiceps EN
    - Fishing cat, P. viverrinus VU presence uncertain
- Family Viverridae (civets)
  - Genus: Arctictis
    - Binturong, A. binturong VU
  - Genus: Arctogalidia
    - Small-toothed palm civet, A. trivirgata LC
  - Genus: Cynogale
    - Otter civet, C. bennettii EN
  - Genus: Hemigalus
    - Banded palm civet, H. derbyanus NT
  - Genus: Macrogalidia
    - Sulawesi palm civet, M. musschenbroekii VU
  - Genus: Paguma
    - Masked palm civet, P. larvata LC
  - Genus: Paradoxurus
    - Asian palm civet, P. hermaphroditus LC
  - Genus: Viverra
    - Malayan civet, V. tangalunga LC
  - Genus: Viverricula
    - Small Indian civet, V. indica LC
- Family Prionodontidae (linsangs)
  - Genus: Prionodon
    - Banded linsang, P. linsang LC
- Family Herpestidae (mongooses)
  - Genus: Urva
    - Short-tailed mongoose, U. brachyura NT
    - Javan mongoose, U. javanica LC
    - Collared mongoose, U. semitorquata NT
- Family Ursidae (bears)
  - Genus: Helarctos
    - Sun bear, H. malayanus VU
- Family Canidae (Canids)
  - Genus: Cuon
    - Dhole, C. alpinus EN
- Family: Mustelidae (weasels)
  - Genus: Aonyx
    - Asian small-clawed otter, A. cinereus VU
  - Genus: Arctonyx
    - Sumatran hog badger, A. hoevenii LC
  - Genus: Lutra
    - Eurasian otter, L. lutra NT
    - Hairy-nosed otter, L. sumatrana EN
  - Genus: Lutrogale
    - Smooth-coated otter, L. perspicillata VU
  - Genus: Martes
    - Yellow-throated marten, M. flavigula LC
  - Genus: Melogale
    - Bornean ferret-badger, M. everetti VU
    - Javan ferret-badger, M. orientalis LC
  - Genus: Mustela
    - Indonesian mountain weasel, M. lutreolina LC
    - Malayan weasel, M. nudipes LC
- Family Mephitidae (skunks)
  - Genus: Mydaus
    - Sunda stink badger, M. javanensis LC

=== Order: Perissodactyla (odd-toed ungulates) ===
The odd-toed ungulates are browsing and grazing mammals. They are usually large to very large, and have relatively simple stomachs and a large middle toe.

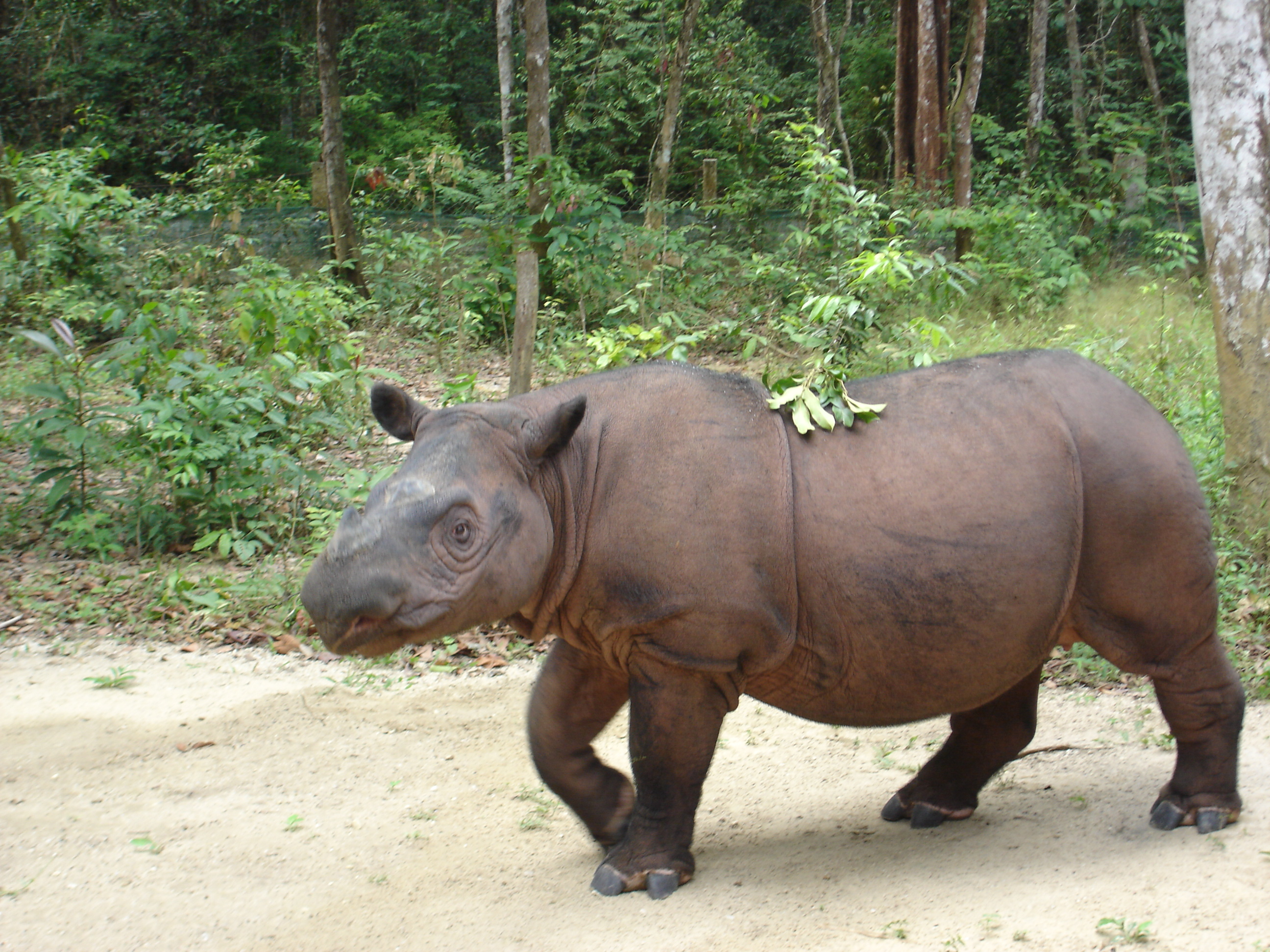
Sumatran rhinoceros

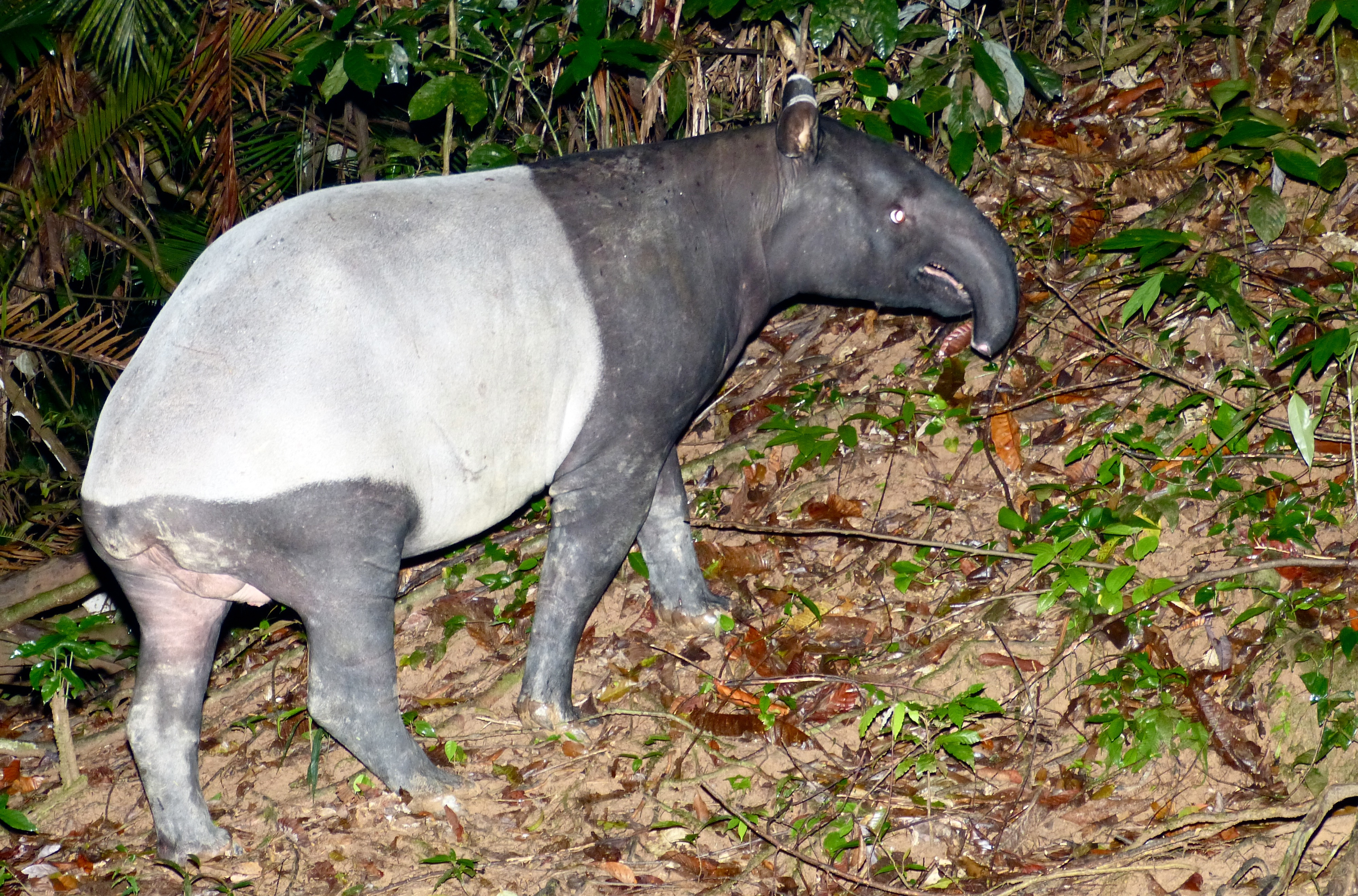
Malayan tapir

- Family Rhinocerotidae (rhinoceroses)
  - Genus: Dicerorhinus
    - Sumatran rhinoceros, D. sumatrensis CR
  - Genus: Rhinoceros
    - Javan rhinoceros, R. sondaicus CR
- Family Tapiridae (tapirs)
  - Genus: Acrocodia
    - Malayan tapir, A. indicus EN

=== Order: Artiodactyla (even-toed ungulates) ===
The even-toed ungulates are ungulates whose weight is borne about equally by the third and fourth toes, rather than mostly or entirely by the third as in perissodactyls. There are about 220 artiodactyl species, including many that are of great economic importance to humans.

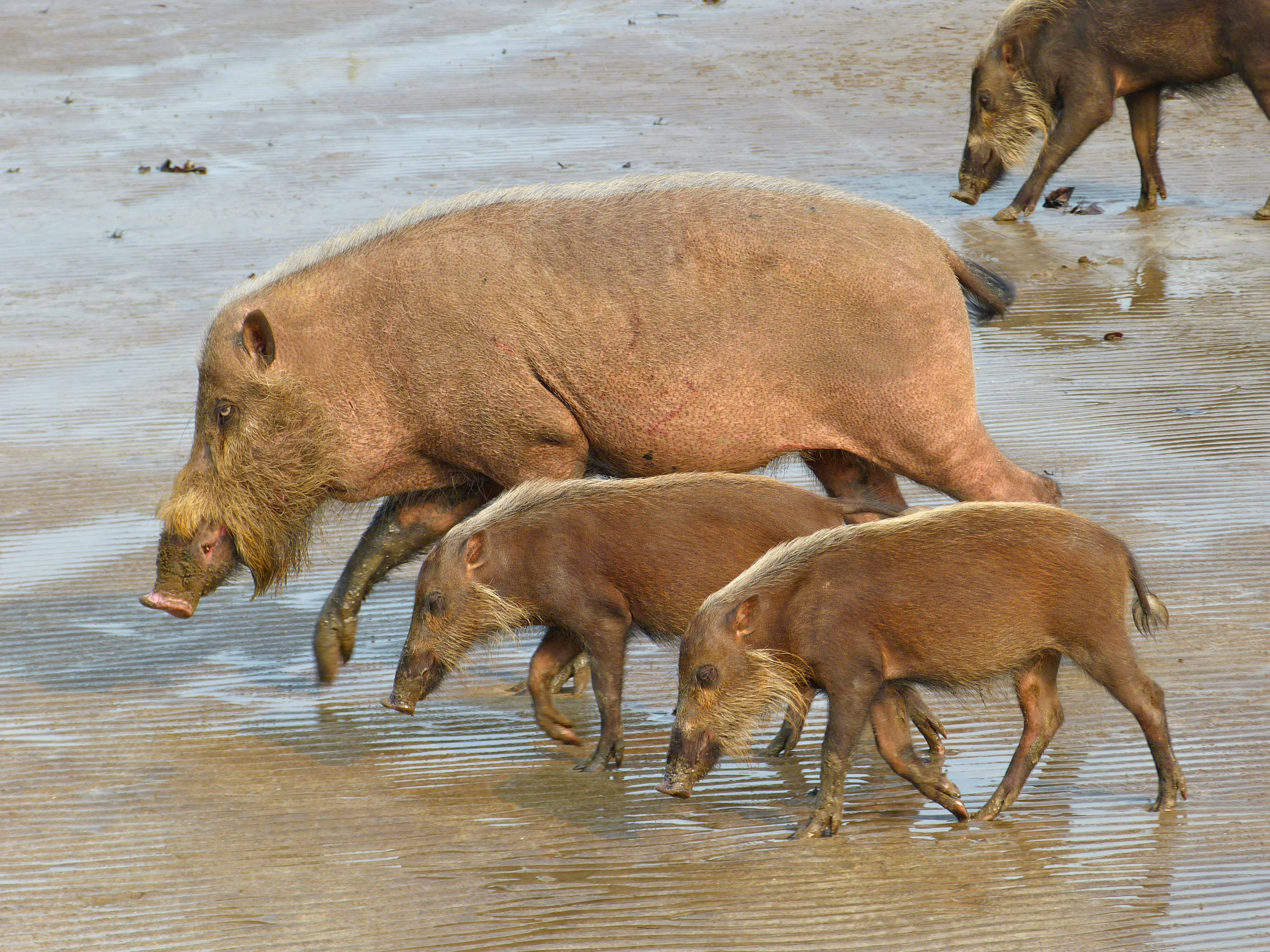
Bornean bearded pig

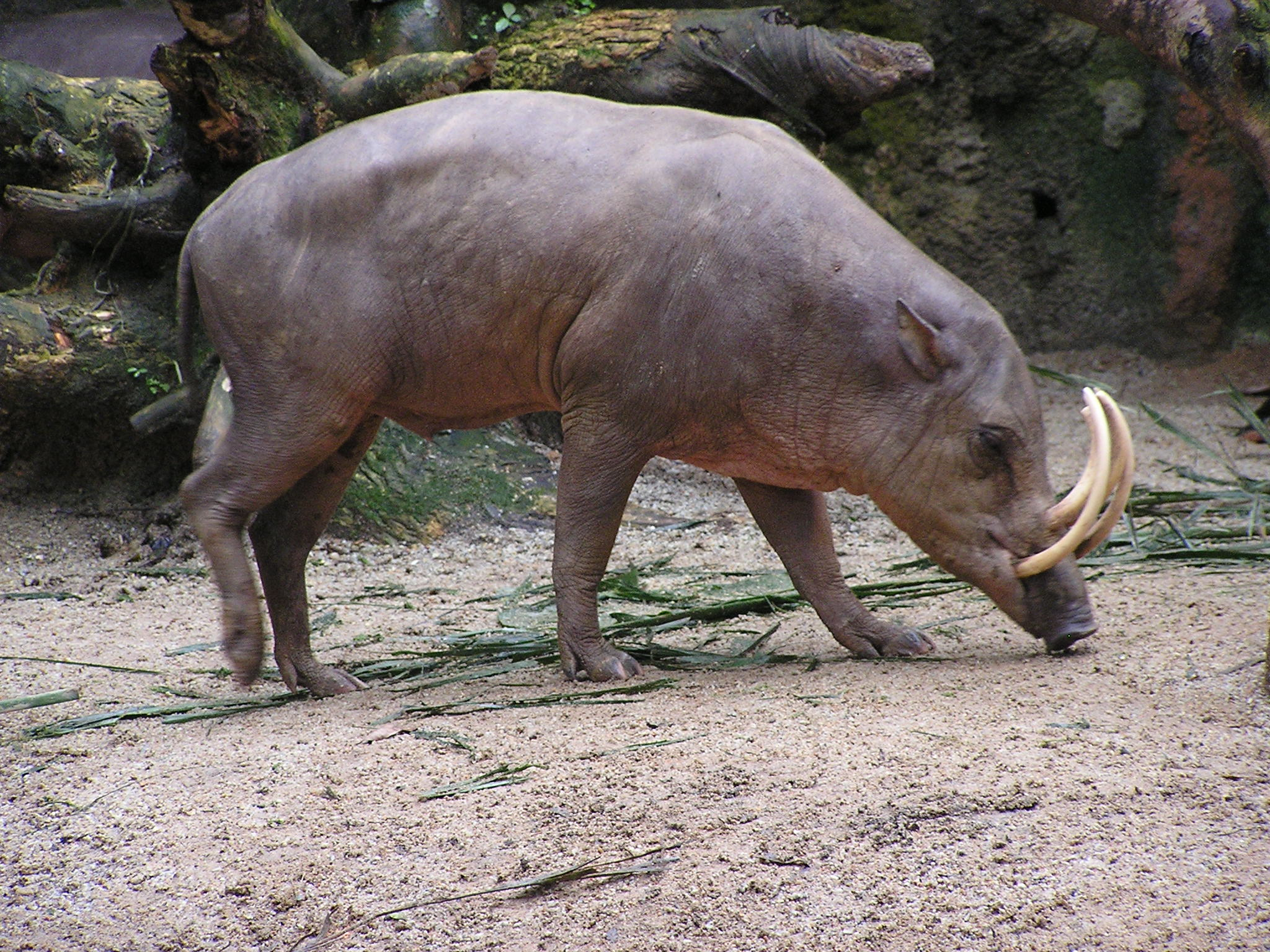
North Sulawesi babirusa

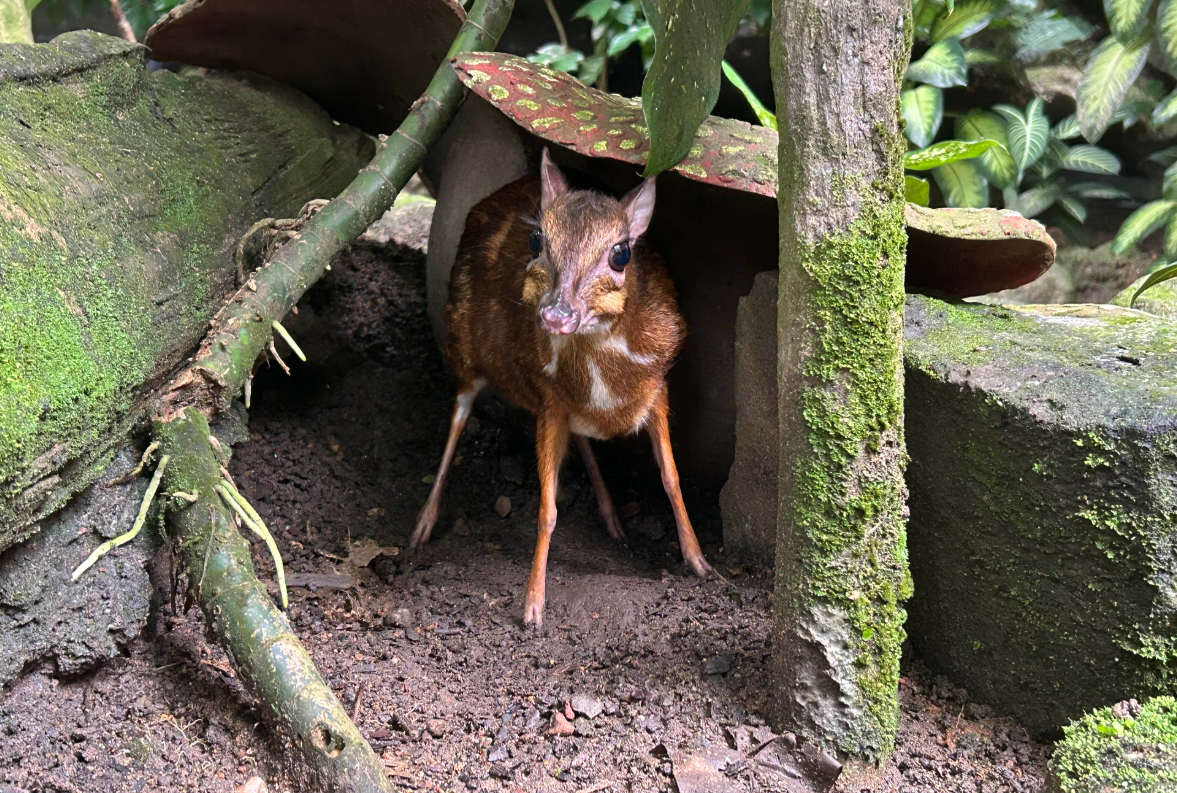
Lesser mouse-deer

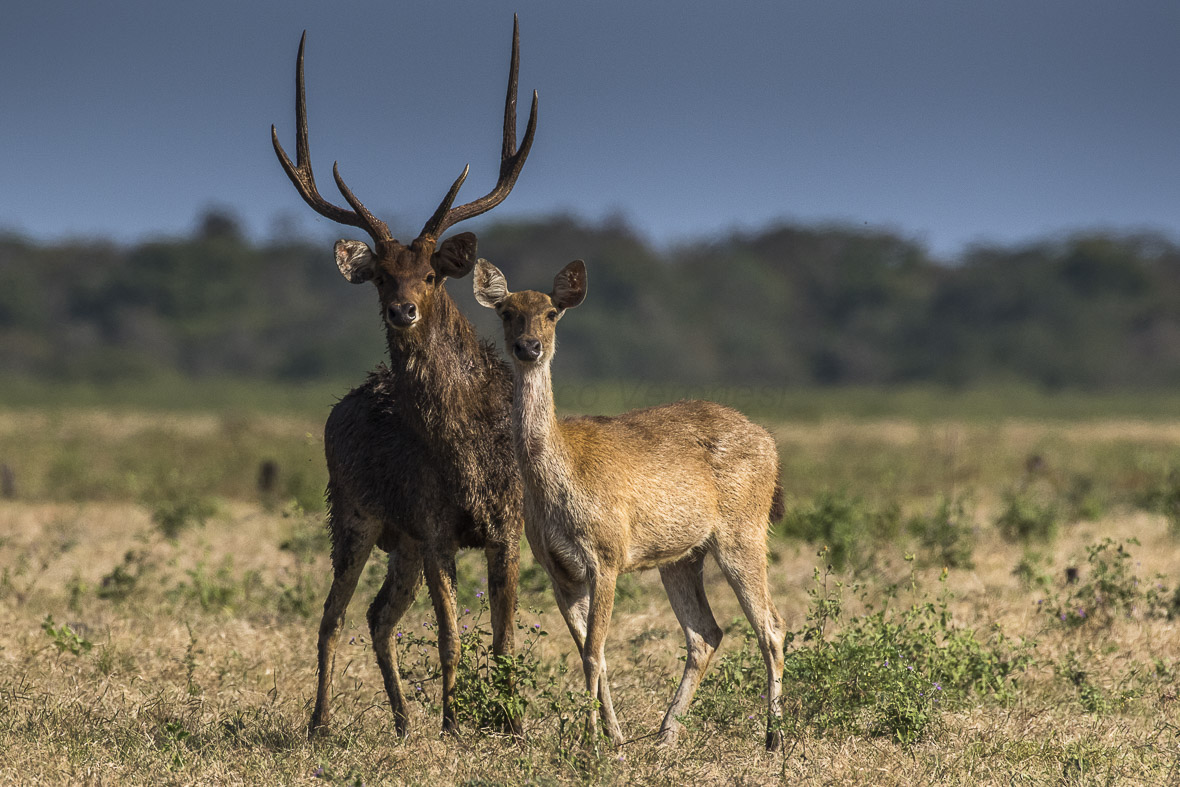
Javan rusa deer

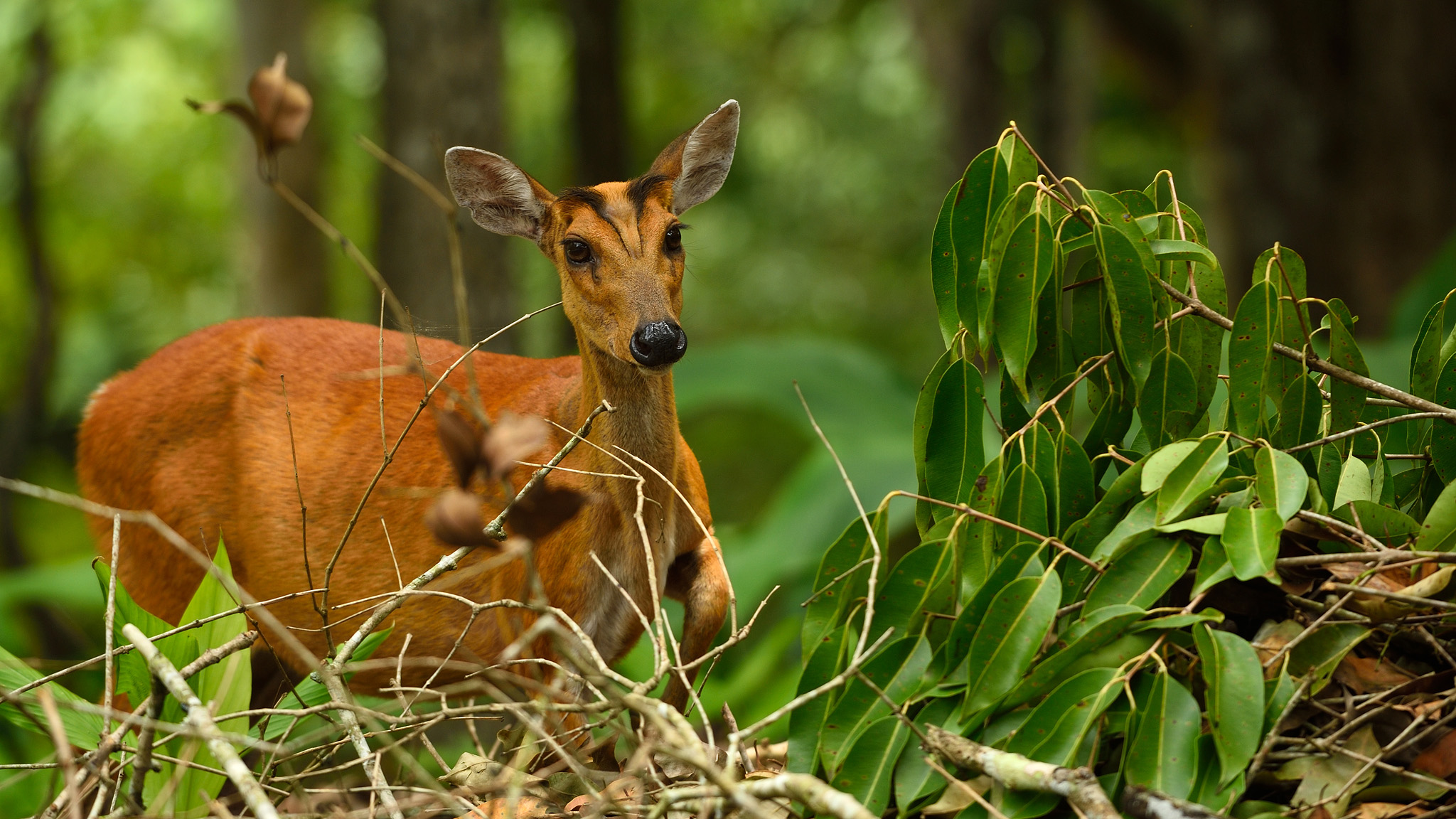
Northern red muntjac

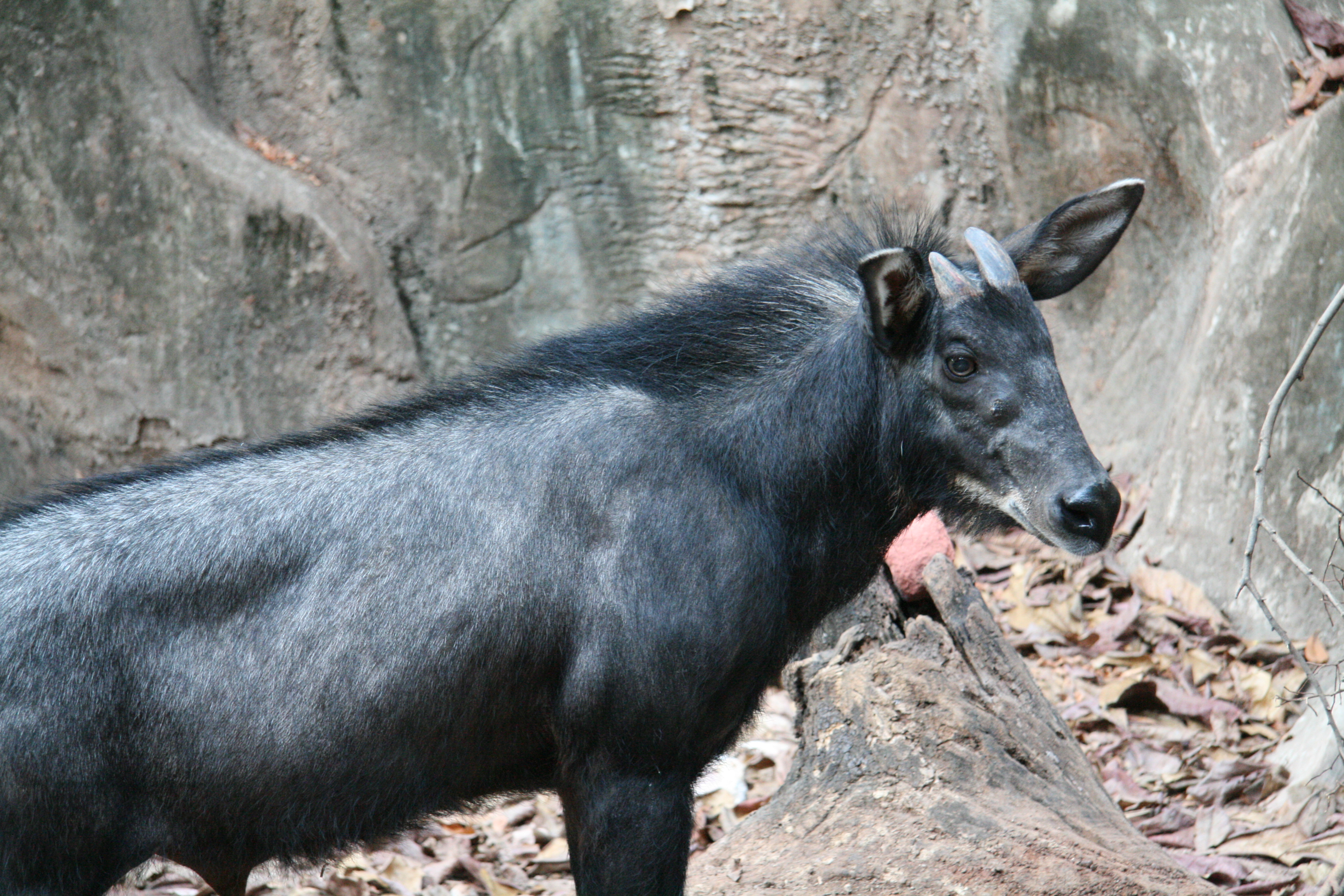
Mainland serow

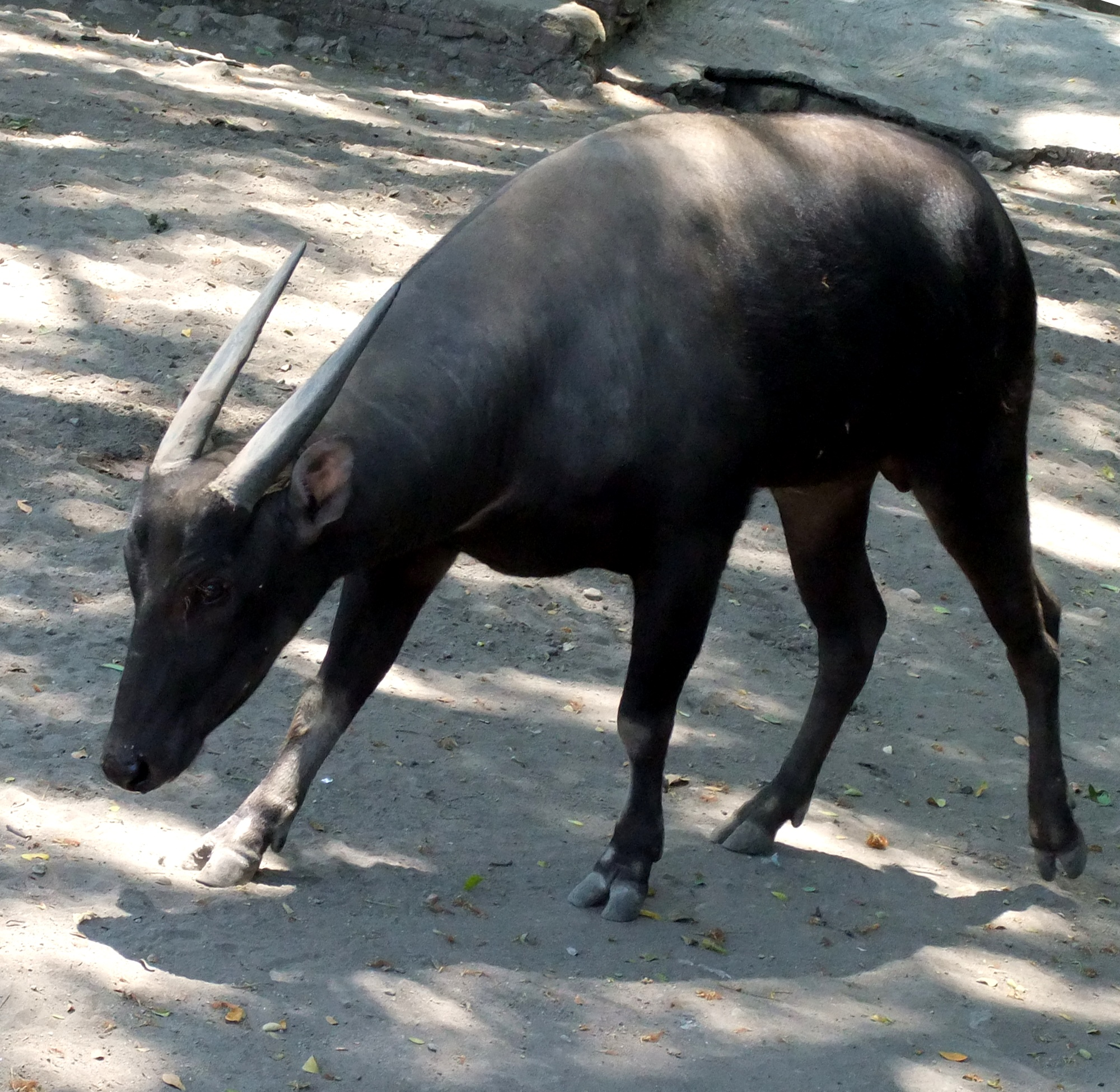
Mainland anoa

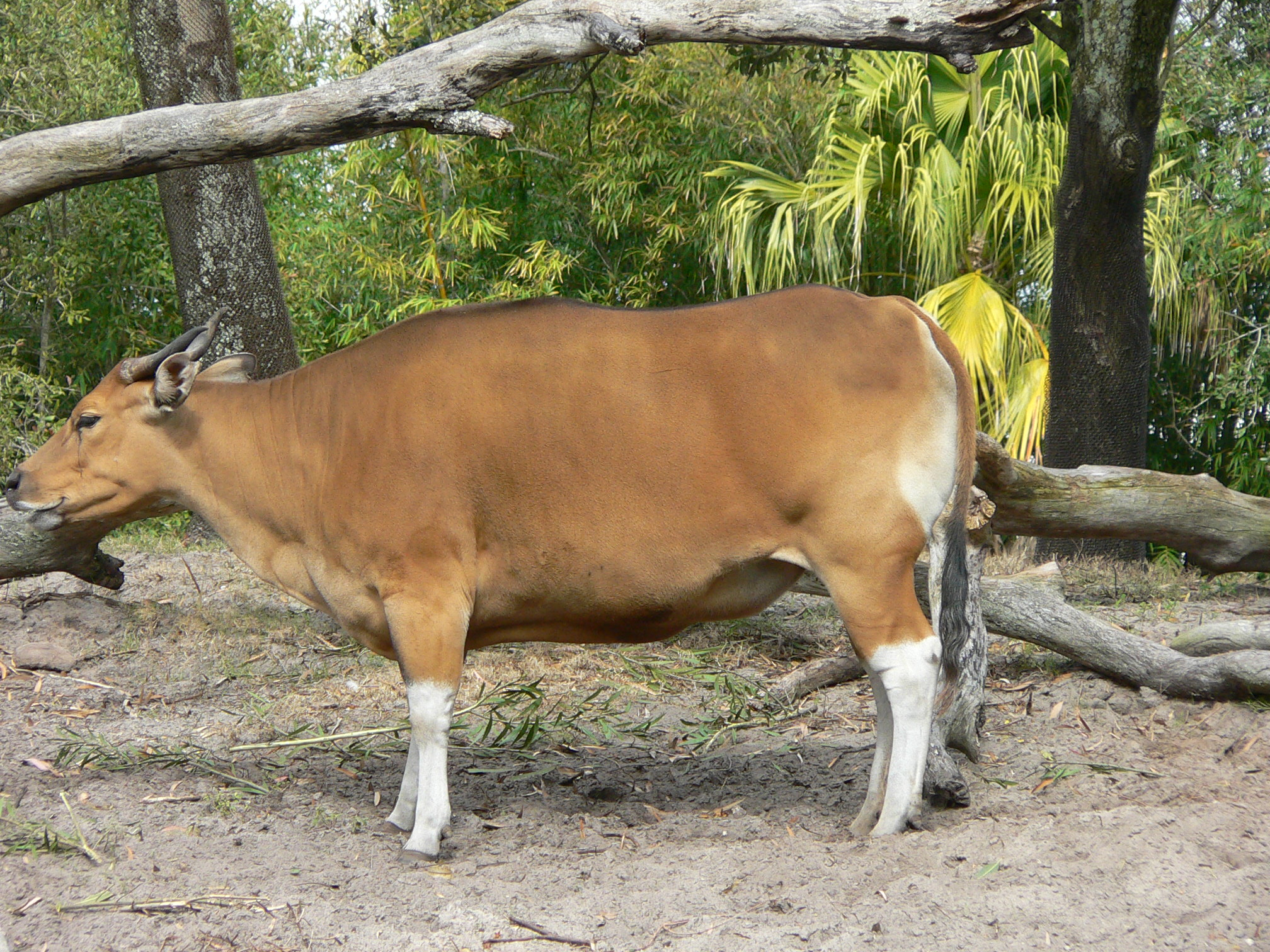
Banteng

- Family Suidae (pigs)
  - Genus: Babyrousa
    - Buru babirusa, B. babyrussa VU
    - Bola Batu babirusa, B. bolabatuensis VU
    - North Sulawesi babirusa, B. celebensis VU
    - Togian babirusa, B. togeanensis EN
  - Genus: Sus
    - Bornean bearded pig, S. barbatus VU
    - Celebes warty pig, S. celebensis NT
    - Wild boar, S. scrofa LC
    - Javan warty pig, S. verrucosus EN
- Family Tragulidae (mouse deer)
  - Genus: Tragulus
    - Java mouse-deer, T. javanicus DD
    - Lesser mouse-deer, T. kanchil LC
    - Greater mouse-deer, T. napu LC
- Family Bovidae (Bovids)
  - Genus: Bos
    - Banteng, B. javanicus EN
  - Genus: Bubalus
    - Lowland anoa, B. depressicornis EN
    - Mountain anoa, B. quarlesi EN
  - Genus: Capricornis
    - Mainland serow, C. sumatraensis VU
- Family Cervidae (deer)
  - Genus: Axis
    - Bawean deer, A. kuhlii CR
  - Genus: Muntiacus
    - Bornean yellow muntjac, M. atherodes NT
    - Sumatran muntjac, M. montanus DD
    - Indian muntjac, M. muntjak LC
  - Genus: Rusa
    - Rusa deer, R. timorensis VU
    - Sambar deer, R. unicolor VU

== Locally extinct ==
The following taxa are locally extinct in the country:

- Wild water buffalo, Bubalus arnee
- Bali tiger and Javan tiger, both Panthera tigris sondaica populations
