= Giant rat =

The name giant rat has been applied to various species of large rats (or animals that appear similar to large rats) and may refer to:

== Africa ==
- Gambian pouched rat, Cricetomys gambianus
- Giant pouched rat, genus Cricetomys
- Malagasy giant rat, Hypogeomys antimena

== Asia and New Guinea ==
- Flores giant rat, Papagomys armandvillei
- Mountain giant Sunda rat, Sundamys infraluteus
- Giant cloud rats, southern giant slender-tailed cloud rat Phloeomys cumingi and northern Luzon giant cloud rat Phloeomys pallidus
- White-eared giant rats, western white-eared giant rat, Hyomys dammermani and eastern white-eared giant rat Hyomys goliath
- Woolly rats, genus Mallomys
- Large bamboo rat, Rhizomys sumatrensis

== South America ==
- Coypu, nutria, or river rat,. Myocastor coypus
- Capybara, genus Hydrochoerus
- Woolly giant rat, Kunsia tomentosus

== Extinct species ==
- East Timor giant rat, an extinct species, genus Coryphomys
- Tenerife giant rat, an extinct species, Canariomys bravoi
- Fossorial giant rat, Kunsia fronto

== Fictional characters ==
- The Giant Rat of Sumatra, a giant rat featured in the Sherlock Holmes stories by Arthur Conan Doyle
- Kingdok, a primary antagonist in the Bone series of comics
- Giant Rats, a recurring enemy in the Dark Souls series

== See also ==
- Gigantism, the phenomenon of animals to grow to giant sizes relative to their species
- Rat
