= Varanus hooijeri =

Varanus hooijeri Temporal range: Late Pleistocene-Holocene

Scientific classification
- Kingdom: Animalia
- Phylum: Chordata
- Class: Reptilia
- Order: Squamata
- Suborder: Anguimorpha
- Family: Varanidae
- Genus: Varanus
- Species: †V. hooijeri

Binomial name
- †Varanus hooijeri Brongersma, 1958

Extinct species of reptile

Varanus hooijeri (also known as Flores Monitor) is an extinct species of a medium-sized monitor lizard, found in Liang Bua on Flores and possibly also Sumba in Indonesia, dating back to the Late Pleistocene and Holocene.

== Discovery ==
It was described in 1958 by Leo Daniël Brongersma on the island of Flores in Indonesia. In 2021, two maxilla bones from each having four teeth from Liang Lawuala on Sumba, were assigned to V. cf. hooijeri, suggesting that it inhabited Sumba as well.

== Description ==
Varanus hooijeri is a medium-sized varanid, at around 1.5 metres (4.9 ft) long, around the size of a living Nile monitor. The teeth of V. hooijeri are blunt and wide (or bunodont). Unlike the sharp, curved teeth typically seen in other monitor lizards, this has been assessed as adapted for a frugivore diet, supplemented by small mammals and insects.

== Paleoecology ==
Varanus hooijeri lived with another, much larger, monitor lizard, the living Komodo dragon. Due to its frugivore diet, it would have niche partitioned with a larger animal, although it may have been prey for the latter.

It also lived with the dwarf proboscidean Stegodon florensis, the large stork Leptoptilos robustus, the cat-sized Flores giant rat and the dwarf hominid Homo floresiensis.

== Extinction ==
The youngest remains of the species date to the Holocene.
