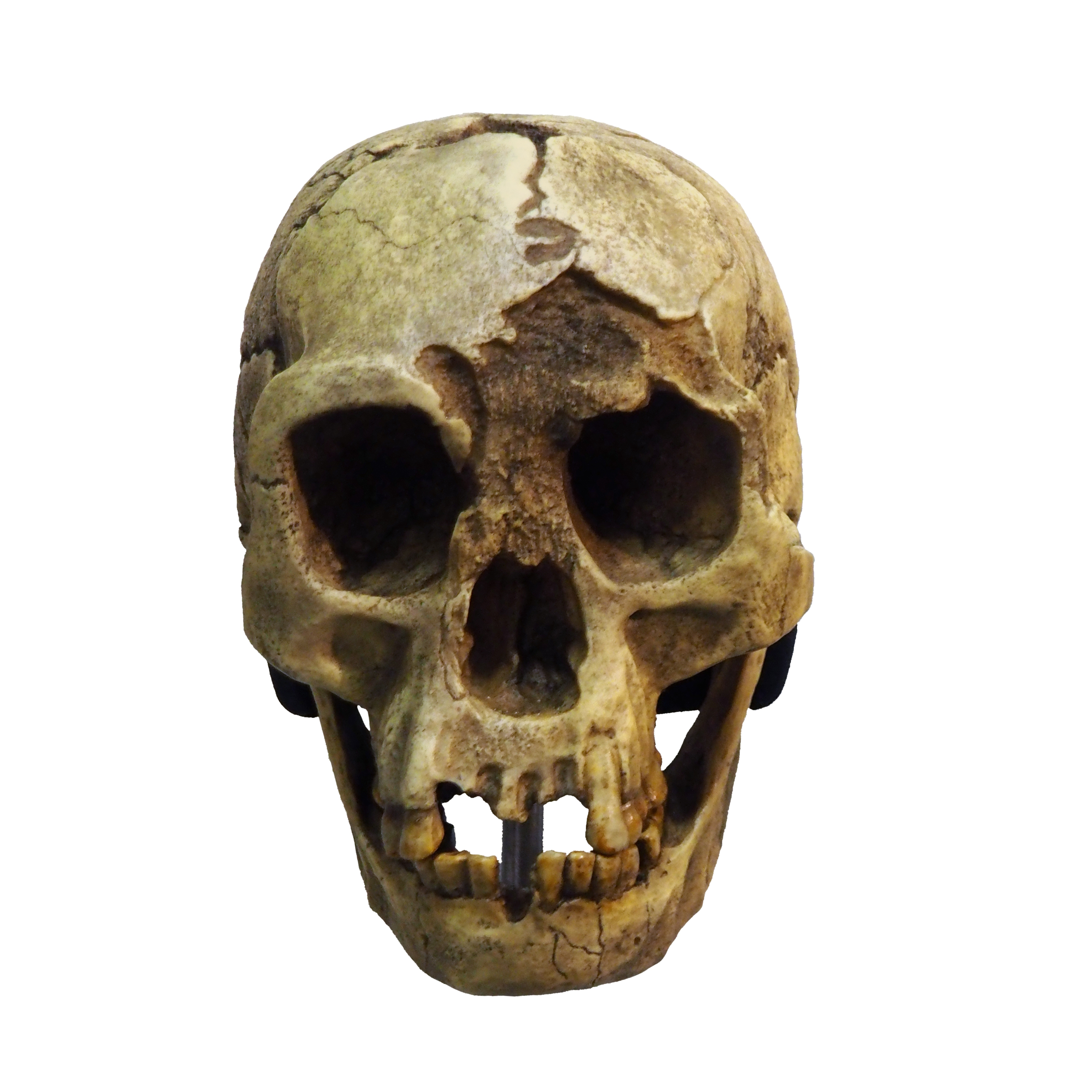
- H. floresiensis skull, Cantonal Museum of Geology, Switzerland

Scientific classification
- Kingdom: Animalia
- Phylum: Chordata
- Class: Mammalia
- Order: Primates
- Superfamily: Hominoidea
- Family: Hominidae
- Genus: Homo
- Species: †H. floresiensis

Binomial name
- †Homo floresiensis Brown et al., 2004
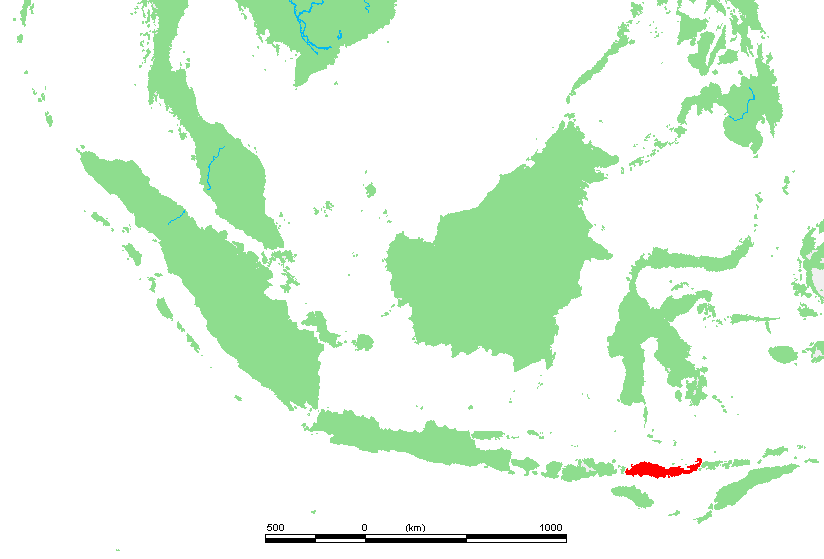
- Flores in Indonesia, shown highlighted in red

= Homo floresiensis =

Homo floresiensis Temporal range: Middle Pleistocene-Late Pleistocene 0.7–0.05 Ma

Extinct small human species found in Flores

Homo floresiensis ( /flɔːrˈɛziːˌɛn.sɪs/), also known as "Flores Man" or "Hobbit" (after the fictional species), is an extinct species of small archaic humans that inhabited the island of Flores, Indonesia, until the arrival of modern humans about 50,000 years ago.

The remains of an individual who would have stood about 1.1 m (3 ft 7 in) in height were discovered in 2003 at Liang Bua cave. As of 2015, partial skeletons of 15 individuals have been recovered; this includes one complete skull, referred to as "LB1".

The ancestors of H. floresiensis are suggested to have arrived on the island around 1.27–1 million years ago. It is now generally accepted that the small body size of H. floresiensis is the result of insular dwarfism, a common phenomenon among island animals. It has historically been debated whether H. floresiensis was the dwarfed descendant of Javanese Homo erectus, or whether it represents an otherwise undetected migration of small, Australopithecus or Homo habilis-grade archaic humans outside of Africa.

This hominin was at first considered remarkable for its survival until relatively recent times, initially thought to be only 12,000 years ago. However, more extensive stratigraphic and chronological work has pushed the dating of the most recent evidence of its existence back to 50,000 years ago. The Homo floresiensis skeletal material at Liang Bua is now dated from 60,000 to 100,000 years ago; stone tools recovered alongside the skeletal remains were from archaeological horizons ranging from 50,000 to 190,000 years ago. Other earlier remains from Mata Menge date to around 700,000 years ago.

== Specimens ==
=== Discovery ===
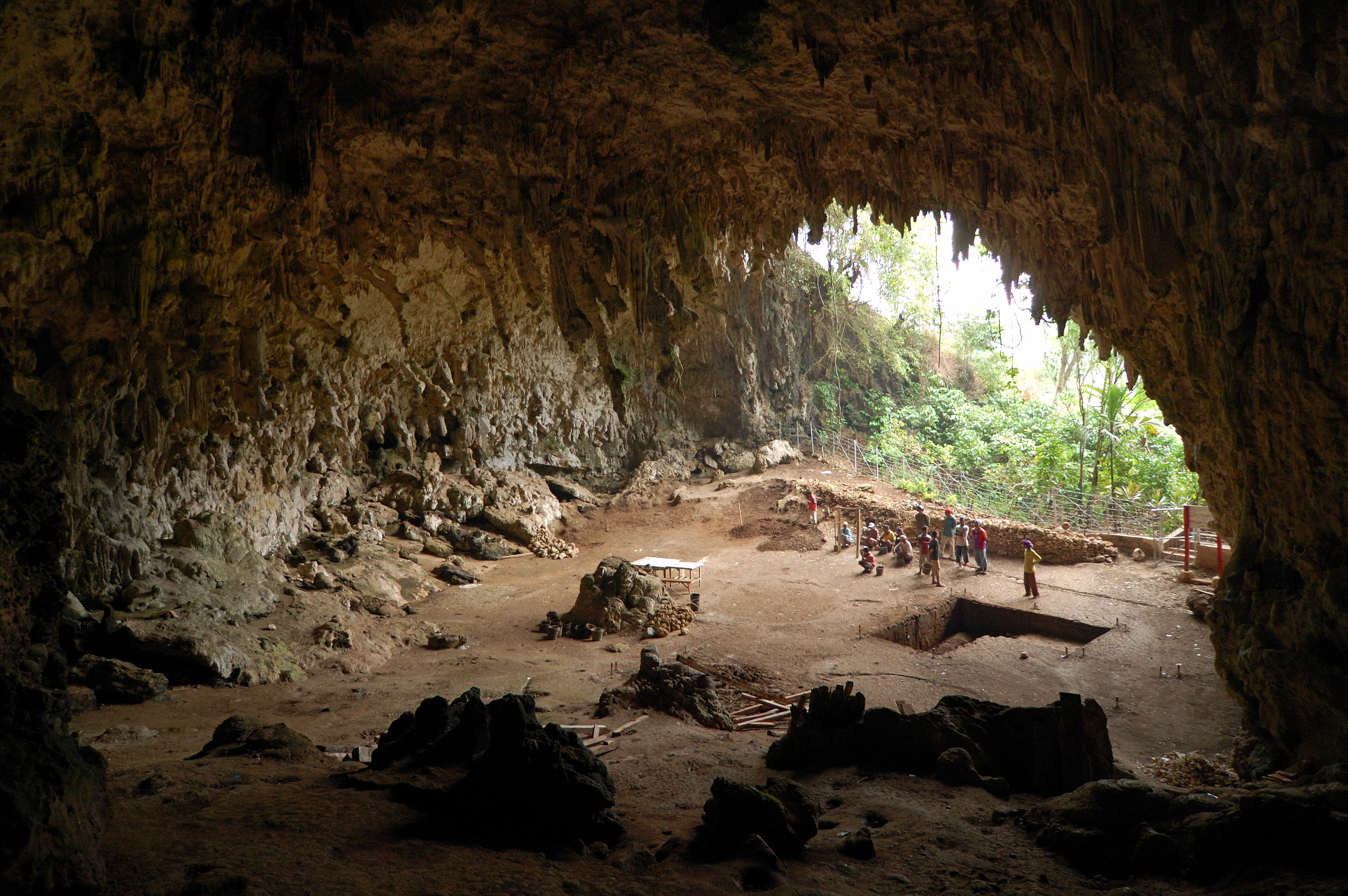
Liang Bua Cave, where the specimens were discovered

The first specimens were discovered on the Indonesian island of Flores on 2 September 2003 by a joint Australian-Indonesian team of archaeologists, led by Thomas Sutikna and Mike Morwood, looking for evidence of the original human migration of modern humans from Asia to Australia. They instead recovered a nearly complete, small-statured skeleton, LB1, in the Liang Bua cave, and subsequent excavations in 2003 and 2004 recovered seven additional skeletons, initially dated from 38,000 to 13,000 years ago.

In 2004, a separate species Homo floresiensis was named and described by Peter Brown et al., with LB1 as the holotype. A tooth, LB2, was referred to the species. LB1 is a fairly complete skeleton, including a nearly complete skull, which belonged to a 30-year-old woman, and has been nicknamed "Little Lady of Flores" or "Flo". An arm bone provisionally assigned to H. floresiensis, specimen LB3, is about 74,000 years old. The specimens are not fossilized and have been described as having "the consistency of wet blotting paper". Once exposed, the bones had to be left to dry before they could be dug up. The discoverers proposed that a variety of features, both primitive and derived, identify these individuals as belonging to a new species. Based on previous date estimates, the discoverers also proposed that H. floresiensis lived contemporaneously with modern humans on Flores. Before publication, the discoverers were considering placing LB1 into her own genus, Sundanthropus floresianus (lit. 'Sunda human from Flores'); however, reviewers of the article recommended that, despite her size, she should be placed in the genus Homo.

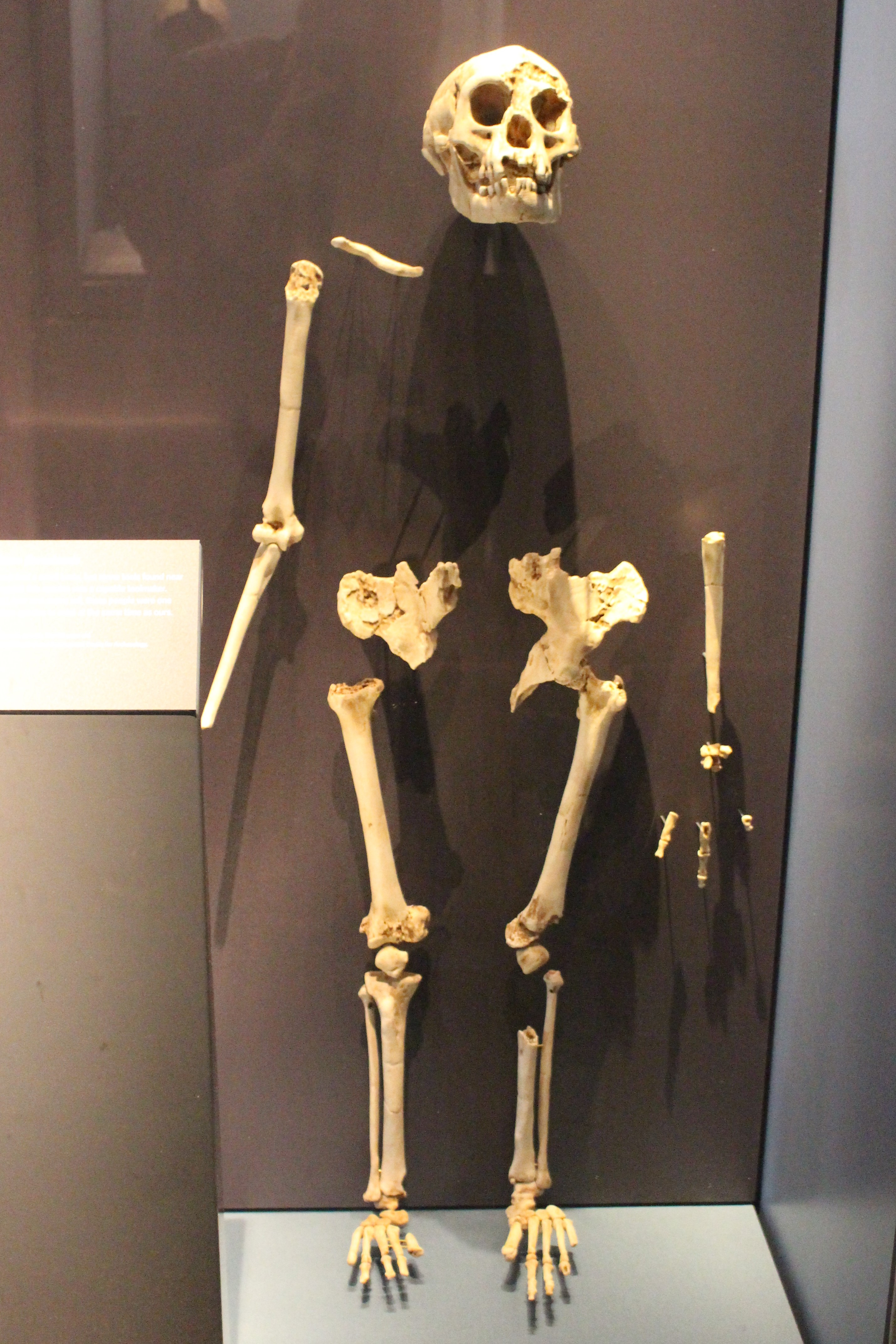
Skeleton at the Natural History Museum, London

In 2009, additional finds were reported, increasing the minimum number of individuals represented by bones to fourteen. In 2015, teeth were referred to a fifteenth individual, LB15.

Stone implements of a size considered appropriate to these small humans are also widely present in the cave. The implements are at horizons initially dated to 95,000 to 13,000 years ago. Modern humans reached the region by around 50,000 years ago, by which time H. floresiensis is thought to have become extinct. Comparisons of the stone artifacts with those made by modern humans in East Timor indicate many technological similarities.

=== Scandal over specimen damage ===
The fossils are property of the Republic of Indonesia. In early December 2004, Indonesian paleoanthropologist Teuku Jacob, formerly chief paleontologist of the Indonesian Gadjah Mada University, removed most of the remains from their repository at Jakarta's National Research Centre of Archaeology with the permission of Raden Panji Soejono, one of the institute's directors. He kept the bones for three months.

Professor Jacob had previously stated that he did not believe the specimens represented a different species, and claimed that the LB1 find was from a 25–30 year-old member of an omnivorous subspecies of H. sapiens; further speculating that it probably was a pygmy and that the size of its skull was even so much smaller due to pathological microcephaly, which produces a small brain and skull.

Professor Richard Roberts of the University of Wollongong in Australia and other anthropologists objected to this withholding of the evidence by an individual with self-proclaimed bias against contrary research investigating support for a new species of Homo, saying they feared that important scientific evidence would be sequestered by a small group of scientists who neither allowed access by other scientists nor published their own research. Jacob returned the remains on 23 February 2005 with portions severely damaged and missing two leg bones.

Press reports thus described the condition of the returned remains:

"[including] long, deep cuts marking the lower edge of the Hobbit's jaw on both sides, said to be caused by a knife used to cut away the rubber mould ... the chin of a second Hobbit jaw was snapped off and glued back together. Whoever was responsible misaligned the pieces and put them at an incorrect angle ... The pelvis was smashed, destroying details that reveal body shape, gait and evolutionary history.",

causing the discovery team leader Morwood to remark,

"It's sickening; Jacob was greedy and acted totally irresponsibly."

Jacob, however, denied any wrongdoing. He stated that the damages occurred during transport from Yogyakarta back to Jakarta despite the reported contrary physical evidence that the jawbone had been broken while making a mould of the bones.

In 2005, Indonesian officials forbade access to the cave. Some news media, such as the BBC, expressed the opinion that the restriction was to protect Jacob, who was considered "Indonesia's king of palaeoanthropology", from being proved wrong. Scientists were allowed to return to the cave in 2007, shortly after Jacob's death.

== Classification and evolution ==
Hominin timeline
← / Earlier apes; ← / Gorilla split; ← / Chimpanzee split; ← / Earliest bipedal; ← / Earliest sign of Ardipithecus; ← / Earliest sign of Australopithecus; ← / Earliest stone tools; ← / Earliest sign of Homo; ← / Dispersal beyond Africa; ← / Earliest fire / cooking; ← / Earliest rock art; ← / Earliest clothes; ← / Modern humans
(million years ago)

=== Phylogeny and evolution ===
Because of the deep neighbouring Lombok Strait, Flores remained an isolated island during episodes of low sea level. Therefore, the ancestors of H. floresiensis could only have reached the island by oceanic dispersal, most likely by rafting. The oldest stone tools on Flores are around 1 million years old. Stone artifacts are absent from sites over 1.27 million years old, suggesting that the ancestors of H. floresiensis arrived after this time.

In 2016, fossil teeth and a partial jaw from hominins assumed to be ancestral to H. floresiensis were discovered at Mata Menge, about 74 km (46 mi) from Liang Bua. They date to about 700,000 years ago. Other remains (including a humerus) were later described from Mata Menge, with the remains subsequently being directly assigned to H. floresiensis. These remains are about the same size or somewhat smaller than the remains from Liang Bua, suggesting the size of the species remained stable for hundreds of thousands of years up until its extinction.

Two hypotheses have been proposed as to the origin of H. floresiensis. The first proposes that H. floresiensis descended from an early migration of very primitive small Australopithecus/Homo habilis-grade archaic humans outside of Africa prior to 1.75 million years ago. This is based on various aspects of H. floresiensis sketetal anatomy, such as its feet bones being considered as more similar to those of very archaic humans such as Australopithecus and Homo habilis than to Homo erectus. This position has been supported by several cladistical analyses.

Other authors have argued that H. floresiensis instead likely represents the descendants of a population of Javanese Homo erectus that became isolated on Flores, with the small body size being the result of insular dwarfism, a well known evolutionary trend found among various island animals. These authors alternatively suggest that H. floresiensis has several cranial and dental similarities to H. erectus, particularly to early Javanese Homo erectus. These authors also dispute some of the similarities to Australopithecus and Homo habilis-grade archaic humans, and suggest that others may have been the result of evolutionary reversals/convergence.

It has been noted that there is no evidence of archaic humans in the adjacent (and likely source) region of Java earlier than 1.3-1.5 or 1.8 million years ago, with the earliest human presence on Java being represented by Homo erectus. There is also no evidence of Australopithecus or Homo habilis-grade archaic humans anywhere outside of Africa, which supporters of the Homo erectus-origin hypothesis suggest makes the descent of H. floresiensis from these more primitive hominins unlikely. The insular dwarfism hypothesis is the current consensus as of 2025.

=== DNA extraction attempt ===
In 2006, two teams attempted to extract DNA from a tooth discovered in 2003; however, both teams were unsuccessful. It has been suggested that this happened because the dentine was targeted; new research suggests that the cementum has higher concentrations of DNA. Moreover, the heat generated by the high speed of the drill bit may have denatured the DNA.

=== Congenital disorder claims ===
The small brain size of H. floresiensis at 417 cc prompted hypotheses that the specimens were simply H. sapiens with a birth defect, rather than the result of neurological reorganisation. These claims have subsequently been widely rejected.

==== Microcephaly ====
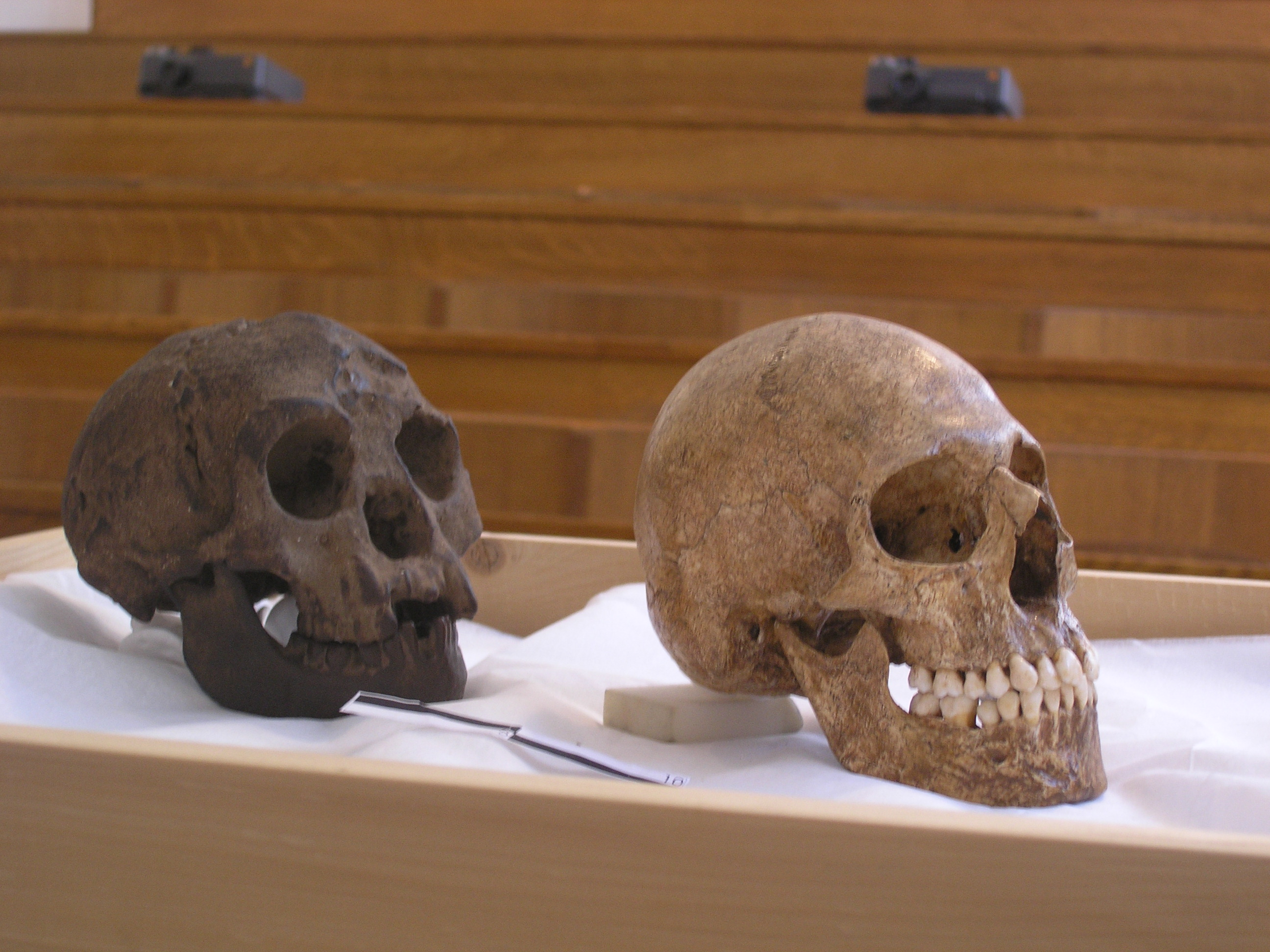
LB1 (left) vs. microcephalic human (right)

Prior to Jacob's removal of the fossils, American neuroanthropologist Dean Falk and her colleagues performed a CT scan of the LB1 skull and a virtual endocast, and concluded that the brainpan was neither that of a pygmy nor an individual with a malformed skull and brain. In response, American neurologist Jochen Weber and colleagues compared the computer model skull with microcephalic human skulls, and found that the skull size of LB1 falls in the middle of the size range of the human samples, and is not inconsistent with microcephaly. A 2006 study stated that LB1 probably descended from a pygmy population of modern humans, but herself shows signs of microcephaly, and other specimens from the cave show small stature but not microcephaly.

In 2005, the original discoverers of H. floresiensis, after unearthing more specimens, countered that the skeptics had mistakenly attributed the height of H. floresiensis to microcephaly. Falk stated that Martin's assertions were unsubstantiated. In 2006, Australian palaeoanthropologist Debbie Argue and colleagues also concluded that the finds are indeed a new species. In 2007, Falk found that H. floresiensis brains were similar in shape to modern humans, and the frontal and temporal lobes were well-developed, which would not have been the case were they microcephalic.

In 2008, Greek palaeontologist George Lyras and colleagues said that LB1 falls outside the range of variation for human microcephalic skulls. However, a 2013 comparison of the LB1 endocast to a set of 100 normocephalic and 17 microcephalic endocasts showed that there is a wide variation in microcephalic brain shape ratios and that in these ratios the group as such is not clearly distinct from normocephalics. The LB1 brain shape nevertheless aligns slightly better with the microcephalic sample, with the shape at the extreme edge of the normocephalic group. A 2016 pathological analysis of LB1's skull revealed no pathologies nor evidence of microcephaly, and concluded that LB1 is a separate species.

==== Laron syndrome ====
A 2007 study postulated that the skeletons were those of humans with Laron syndrome, which was first reported in 1966, and is most common in inbreeding populations, which may have been the scenario on the small island. It causes a short stature and small skull, and many conditions seen in Laron syndrome patients are also exhibited in H. floresiensis. The estimated height of LB1 is at the lower end of the average for afflicted human women, but the endocranial volume is much smaller than anything exhibited in Laron syndrome patients. DNA analysis would be required to support this theory.

==== Congenital iodine deficiency syndrome ====
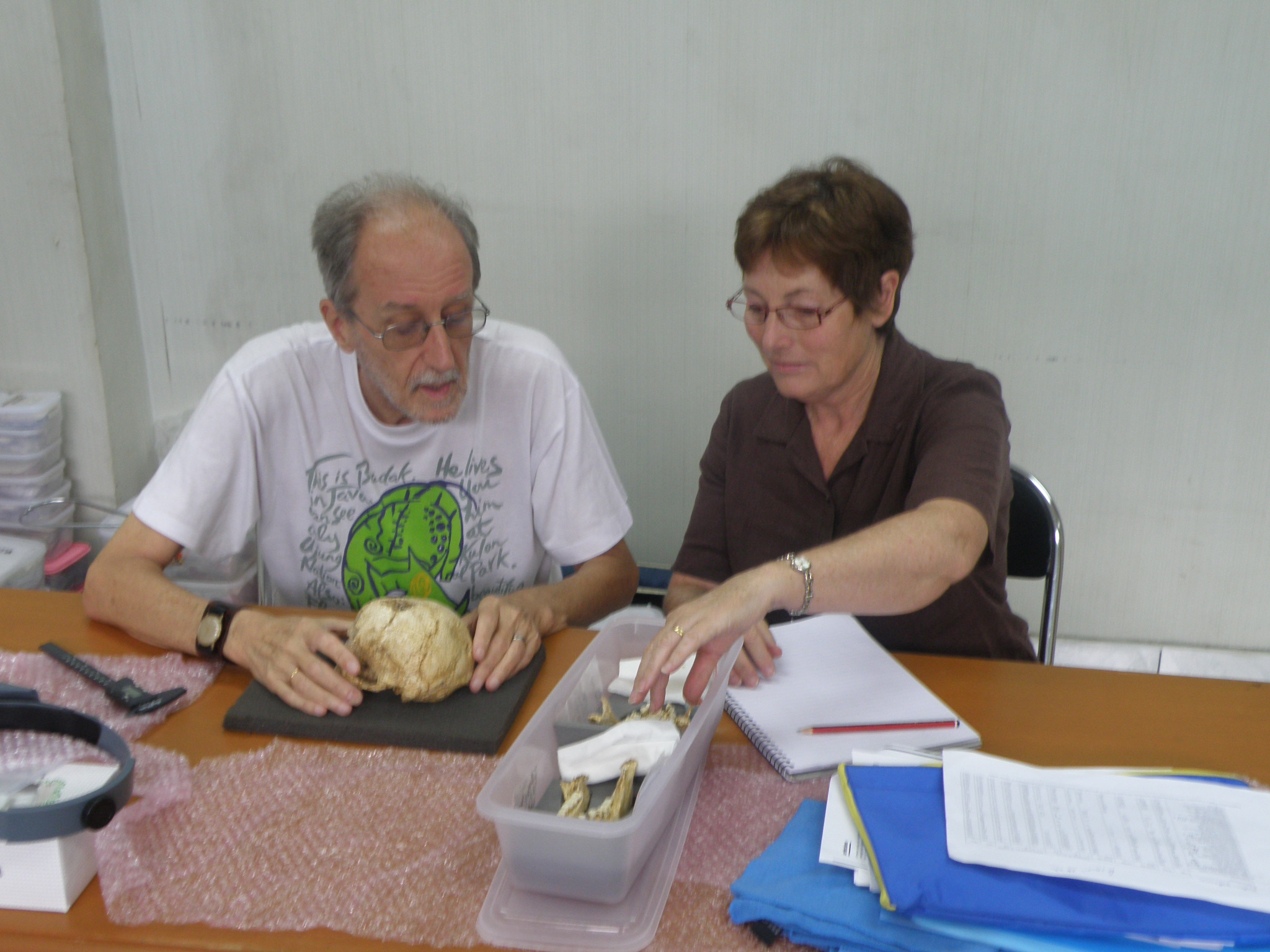
Colin Groves and Debbie Argue examining the type specimen

In 2008, Australian researcher Peter Obendorf — who studies congenital iodine deficiency syndrome — and colleagues suggested that LB1 and LB6 had myxoedematous (ME) congenital iodine deficiency syndrome resulting from congenital hypothyroidism (underactive thyroid), and that they were part of an affected population of H. sapiens on the island. Congenital iodine deficiency syndrome, caused by iodine deficiency, is expressed by small bodies and reduced brain size (but ME causes less motor and mental disablement than other forms of congenital iodine deficiency syndrome), and is a form of dwarfism still found in the local Indonesian population. They said that various features of H. floresiensis are diagnostic characteristics, such as enlarged pituitary fossa, unusually straight and untwisted humeral heads, relatively thick limbs, double rooted premolar, and primitive wrist morphology.

However, Falk's scans of LB1's pituitary fossa show that it is not larger than usual. Also, in 2009, anthropologists Colin Groves and Catharine FitzGerald compared the Flores bones with those of ten people who had had cretinism, and found no overlap. Obendorf and colleagues rejected Groves and FitzGerald's argument the following year. A 2012 study similar to Groves and FitzGeralds' also found no evidence of congenital iodine deficiency syndrome.

==== Down syndrome ====
From 2006, physical anthropologist Maciej Henneberg and colleagues have claimed that LB1 had Down syndrome, and that the remains of other individuals at the Flores site were merely normal modern humans. However, there are a number of characteristics shared by both LB1 and LB6 as well as other known early humans and absent in H. sapiens, such as the lack of a chin. In 2016, a comparative study concluded that LB1 did not exhibit a sufficient number of Down syndrome characteristics to support a diagnosis. The noted physical anthropologist Chris Stringer in 2011 wrote of Homo floresiensis deniers generally, "I think they have damaged their own, and palaeoanthropology's, reputation".

== Anatomy ==
The most important and obvious identifying features of Homo floresiensis are its small body and small cranial capacity. Brown and Morwood also identified a number of additional, less obvious features that might distinguish LB1 from modern H. sapiens, including the form of the teeth, the absence of a chin, and a lesser torsion in the lower end of the humerus (upper arm bone). Each of these putative distinguishing features has been heavily scrutinized by the scientific community, with different research groups reaching differing conclusions as to whether these features support the original designation of a new species, or whether they identify LB1 as a severely pathological H. sapiens.

A 2015 study of the dental morphology of forty teeth of H. floresiensis compared to 450 teeth of living and extinct human species, states that they had "primitive canine-premolar and advanced molar morphologies," which is unique among hominins.

The discovery of additional partial skeletons has verified the existence of some features found in LB1, such as the lack of a chin, but Jacob and other research teams argue that these features do not distinguish LB1 from local modern humans. Lyras et al. have asserted, based on 3D-morphometrics, that the skull of LB1 differs significantly from all H. sapiens skulls, including those of small-bodied individuals and microcephalics, and is more similar to the skull of Homo erectus. Ian Tattersall argues that the species is wrongly classified as Homo floresiensis as it is far too archaic to assign to the genus Homo.

=== Size ===
LB1's height is estimated to have been 1.06 m (3 ft 6 in). The height of a second skeleton, LB8, has been estimated at 1.09 m (3 ft 7 in) based on tibial length. These estimates are outside the range of normal modern human height and considerably shorter than the average adult height of even the smallest modern humans, such as the Mbenga and Mbuti at 1.5 m (4 ft 11 in), Twa, Semang at 1.37 m (4 ft 6 in) for adult women of the Malay Peninsula, or the Andamanese at also 1.37 m (4 ft 6 in) for adult women. LB1's body mass is estimated to have been 25 kg (55 lb). LB1 and LB8 are also somewhat smaller than the australopithecines, such as Lucy, from three million years ago, not previously thought to have expanded beyond Africa. Thus, LB1 and LB8 may be the shortest and smallest members of the extended human group discovered thus far.

Their short stature was likely due to insular dwarfism, where size decreases as a response to fewer resources in an island ecosystem. In 2006, Indonesian palaeoanthropologist Teuku Jacob and colleagues said that LB1 has a similar stature to the Rampasasa pygmies who inhabit the island, and that size can vary substantially in pygmy populations. A 2018 study refuted the possibility of Rampasasa pygmies descending from H. floresiensis, concluding that "multiple independent instances of hominin insular dwarfism occurred on Flores".

Aside from smaller body size, the specimens seem to otherwise resemble H. erectus, a species known to have been living in Southeast Asia at times coincident with earlier finds purported to be of H. floresiensis.

=== Brain ===
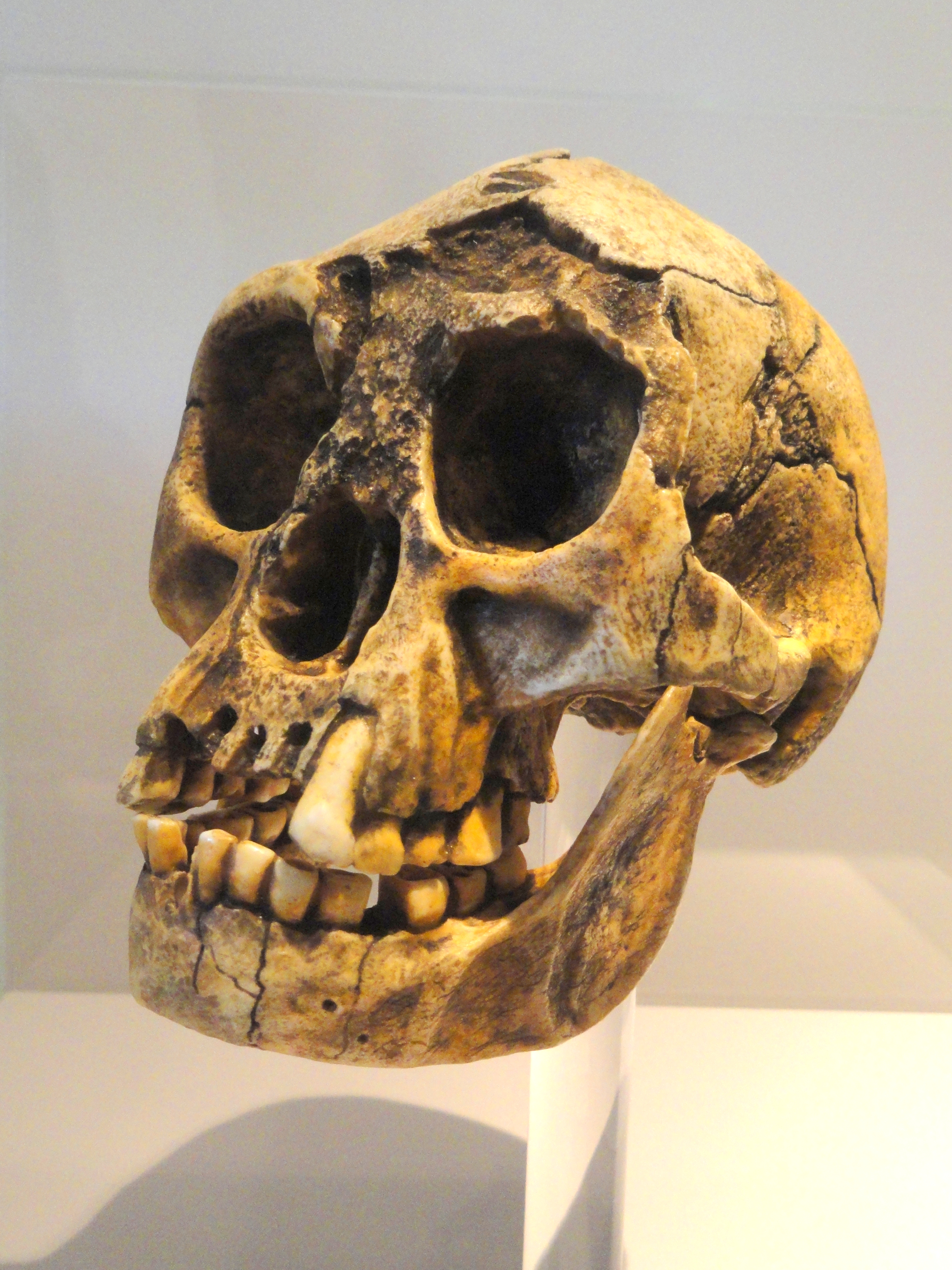
Skull at the Naturmuseum Senckenberg, Germany

In addition to a small body size, H. floresiensis had a remarkably small brain size. LB1's brain is estimated to have had a volume of 380 cm^{3} (23 cu in), placing it at the range of chimpanzees or the extinct australopithecines. LB1's brain size is less than half that of its presumed immediate ancestor, H. erectus (980 cm^{3} (60 cu in)). The brain-to-body mass ratio of LB1 lies between that of H. erectus and the great apes. Such a reduction is likely due to insular dwarfism, and a 2009 study found that the reduction in brain size of extinct pygmy hippopotamuses in Madagascar compared with their living relatives is proportionally greater than the reduction in body size, and similar to the reduction in brain size of H. floresiensis compared with H. erectus.

Smaller size does not appear to have affected mental faculties, as Brodmann area 10 on the prefrontal cortex, which is associated with cognition, is about the same size as that of modern humans. H. floresiensis is also associated with evidence for advanced behaviours, such as the use of fire, butchering, and stone tool manufacturing.

=== Limbs ===
The angle of humeral torsion was lesser than in modern humans. The humeral head of modern humans is twisted between 145 and 165 degrees to the plane of the elbow joint, whereas it is 120 degrees in H. floresiensis. This may have provided an advantage when arm-swinging, and, in tandem with the unusual morphology of the shoulder girdle and short clavicle, would have displaced the shoulders slightly forward into an almost shrugging position. The shrugging position would have compensated for the lower range of motion in the arm, allowing for similar maneuverability in the elbows as in modern humans. The wrist bones are similar to those of apes and Australopithecus. They were significantly smaller and more flexible than the carpals of modern humans, lacking contemporary features which evolved at least 800,000 years ago.

The leg bones were more robust than those of modern humans. The feet were unusually flat and large in relation with the rest of the body. As a result, when walking, they would have had to bend the knees further back than modern humans do. This caused a high-stepping gait and slow walking speed. The toes were thin, long, and halluces were almost indistinguishable from the other metatarsals.

== Culture ==
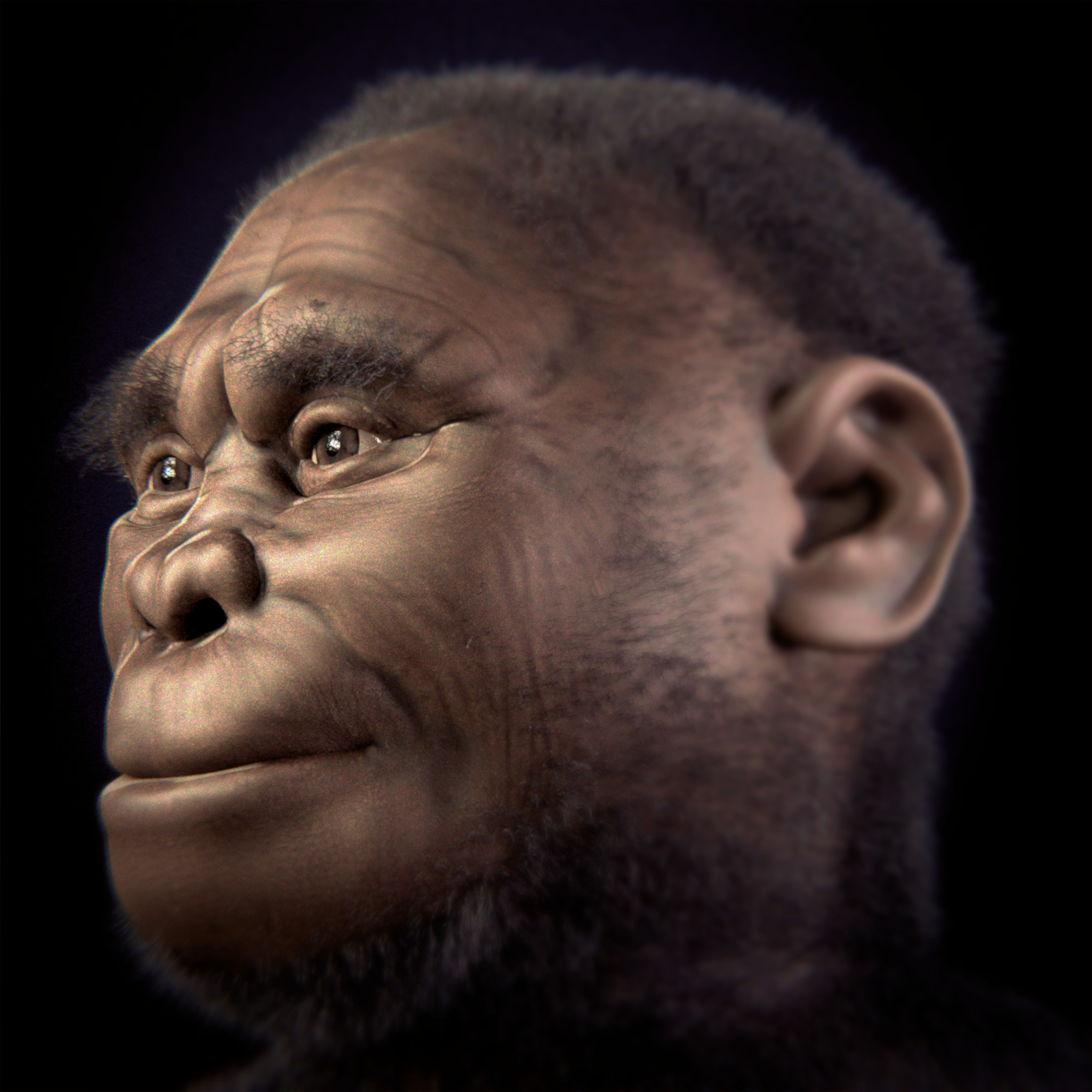
A facial reconstruction of Homo floresiensis

The cave yielded over ten thousand stone artefacts, mainly lithic flakes, surprising considering H. floresiensis's small brain. This has led some researchers to theorize that H. floresiensis inherited their tool-making skills from H. erectus. Points, perforators, blades, and microblades were associated with remains of the extinct elephant-relative Stegodon florensis. It has therefore been proposed that H. floresiensis hunted juvenile Stegodon. Similar artefacts are found at the Soa Basin 50 km (31 mi) south, associated with Stegodon and Komodo dragon remains, and are attributed to a likely ancestral population of H. erectus. Other authors have doubted the extent of hunting of Stegodon by H. floresiensis, noting the rarity of cut marks on remains of Stegodon found at Liang Bua, suggesting that they would have faced intense competition for carcasses with other predators, like the Komodo dragon, the giant stork Leptoptilos robustus, and vultures, and that it was possible that their main prey was instead the giant rats like Papagomys endemic to the island, which are found abundantly at Liang Bua. Analysis of cut and bite marks on Stegodon bones suggests that at Liang Bua, H. floresiensis likely scavenged carcasses which had already been largely consumed by Komodo dragons, and did not have primary access to carcasses, suggesting that hunting was unlikely. While it was initially suggested that H. floresiensis was capable of using fire, the supporting evidence for this claim was later found to be unreliable, with burned bones found in Liang Bua likely the result of fires lit by modern humans inside the cave resulting in burning of bones found in lower layers underneath the fires that had been deposited in the cave thousands to tens of thousands of years prior to the fires.

== Paleoecology ==
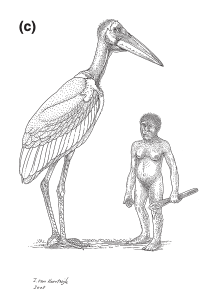
Size of Leptoptilos robustus compared in size to Homo floresiensis

During the late Early Pleistocene to Late Pleistocene, and before the arrival of Homo sapiens, Flores exhibited a depauperate ecosystem with relatively few terrestrial vertebrate species, including the extinct dwarf proboscidean (elephant relative) Stegodon florensis; and a variety of rats (Murinae) including small-sized forms like Rattus hainaldi, the Polynesian rat, Paulamys, and Komodomys, the medium-sized Hooijeromys, and giant Papagomys and extinct Spelaeomys, the latter two genera being about the size of rabbits, with body masses of 600–2,500 grams (1.3–5.5 lb). Also present were the Komodo dragon and another smaller monitor lizard (Varanus hooijeri), with birds including a giant stork (Leptoptilos robustus) and a vulture (Trigonoceps).

== Extinction ==
The youngest H. floresiensis bone remains in Liang Bua date to 60,000 years ago, and the youngest stone tools to 50,000 years ago. The previous estimate of 12,000 BP was due to an undetected unconformity in the cave stratigraphy. The timing of their disappearance from the cave stratigraphy is close to the time that modern humans reached the area, which may suggest the effects of modern humans directly on H. floresiensis or more broadly on the ecosystems of Flores caused or contributed to their extinction. DNA analysis of pygmy modern humans from Flores has found no evidence of any DNA from H. floresiensis.

A 2025 study has suggested that climatic deterioration may have been a contributing factor in the disappearance of Homo floresiensis from the area of Flores surrounding Liang Bua and abandonment of the cave. Geochemical evidence from Liang Bua indicates a prolonged drying trend intensifying around 61,000 years ago, coinciding with declines in local freshwater availability and in Stegodon florensis insularis, a potential prey species. This does not necessarily coincide with the global extinction of H. floresiensis on Flores at this time, and they instead may have moved to/persisted in areas of the island which remained habitable.

== "Hobbit" nickname ==
Homo floresiensis was swiftly nicknamed "the hobbit" by the discoverers, after the fictional race popularized in J. R. R. Tolkien's book The Hobbit, and some of the discoverers suggested naming the species H. hobbitus.

In October 2012, a New Zealand scientist due to give a public lecture on Homo floresiensis was told by the Tolkien Estate that he was not allowed to use the word "hobbit" in promoting the lecture.

In 2012, the American film studio The Asylum, which produces low-budget mockbuster films, planned to release a movie titled Age of the Hobbits depicting a "peace-loving" community of H. floresiensis "enslaved by the Java Men, a race of flesh-eating dragon-riders". The film was intended to piggyback on the success of Peter Jackson's film The Hobbit: An Unexpected Journey. The film was blocked from release because of a legal dispute over the use of the word "hobbit". The Asylum argued that the film did not violate the Tolkien copyright because the film was about H. floresiensis, "uniformly referred to as 'Hobbits' in the scientific community". The film was finally released under its new title, Clash of the Empires.

== See also ==
- Ebu gogo
- Orang Pendek
- Homo luzonensis – Archaic human from Luzon, Philippines
- Denisovan – Archaic human species from Asia
- Neanderthal – Extinct species of human
- Java Man – Subspecies of Homo erectus (fossil) discovered on the island of Java in 1891
