= Theodorus Verhoeven =

Dutch archaeologist

Theodorus (Theo) Lambertus Verhoeven, SVD, (17 September 1907, Uden, The Netherlands – 3 June 1990, Antwerp, Belgium) was a Dutch missionary and archaeologist who has become famous by his discovery of stone tools on the Indonesian island of Flores, in association with the c. 800,000-year-old fossils of stegodontids, or dwarf elephants, from which he concluded that islands in Wallacea had been reached by Homo erectus before modern humans appeared there.

== Life ==
Born at the Markt in Uden, Verhoeven received his training as a priest/missionary in monasteries ('mission houses') of the Societas Verbi Divini (SVD) in Uden (where he was abused by the prefect), Helvoirt and Teteringen respectively. In the latter place he was ordained a priest in 1933 after which, much to his disappointment, he was not allowed to leave for a mission country. Instead he was ordered to become a teacher at his own secondary school, mission house St. Willibrordus in Uden. After that, Verhoeven studied classics at the University of Utrecht. In 1940 he spent some months in Italy to study Roman architecture at Pompeii, Herculaneum and Ostia Tiberina.

During the war he played a crucial role in the Resistance movement by accommodating - contrary to the orders of his superiors - dozens of Jewish children in hiding places. Verhoeven received his doctorate under Hendrik Wagenvoort in 1948. He was subsequently sent to the island of Flores in Indonesia as a missionary, where he taught at the seminaries of Todabelu/Mataloko in Ngada Regency and in Ritapiret near Maumere and intermittently lived there for some 15 years. Mike Morwood's often quoted statement that Verhoeven "left the priesthood, married his secretary, and returned to Europe" is incorrect. Verhoeven stayed a priest until his death and never had a secretary. After an accident with his jeep in 1966 Verhoeven did return to Europe, only to come back to Flores the following year. In 1975 he married a former Belgian nun (after having received dispensation from the Vatican), Paula Hamerlinck, and went to live in Belgium.

== Paleontological work ==
In 1950 Verhoeven commenced archaeological work on the island of Flores. He identified and explored many archeological sites, including the now famous Liang Bua cave. Verhoeven was the first to report on Stegodon remains in Wallacea, first on Flores and later on Timor. This was a major surprise, as larger land mammals like the rhinoceros and elephant were not expected to have crossed the deep waters of the Wallace Line. In 1957 he discovered the first stegondontid fossils reported from Ola Bula in Flores, along with Lower Palaeolithic stone blades and flakes. In 1965 he found a similar concurrence of stone tools with remains of Stegodon-dominated megafauna at nearby Mata Menge. Verhoeven argued that Homo erectus apparently crossed the Wallace Line 750,000 years ago, but this went unnoticed by most and was discounted by others. Only in the late 1990s, after an Indonesian-Dutch effort confirmed his findings and fission track dating had been applied, did more scientists accept this hypothesis.

Also in 1965, he found much younger (neolithic) human graves, stone tools and Paulamys naso fossils in the Liang Bua cave. He did not publish these findings as he was unable to finish his excavations due to a sudden police intervention. Afterwards he contacted the Indonesian archaeologist Raden P. Soejono, who continued the digs in the 1970s and 1980s and estimated an age of 10,000 years. Deeper excavations starting in 2001 would reveal the c. 17,000-year-old Flores Man in this cave in 2003.

== Legacy ==
According to Robert G. Bednarik, Verhoeven was "the greatest archaeological investigator of Wallacea, whose pioneer work was largely ignored in his lifetime." According to Dr. John De Vos, former curator of the Duboiscollection in the Natural Biodiversity Center, Leiden, The Netherlands, Verhoeven was 'simply brilliant'. Verhoeven's giant tree rat (Papagomys theodorverhoeveni) of Flores, declared extinct in 1996, is named after Verhoeven. A fossil of an Anthracotherium (an Eocene mammal) found under Verhoeven's supervision on Timor was given the name Anthracotherium verhoeveni by Professor Ralph von Koenigswald. Paula's long-nosed rat, Paulamys naso, which Verhoeven discovered in the 1950s as a subfossil species and which in 1989 was discovered extant on Flores, was at Verhoeven's request named after his wife Paula Hamerlinck.

== See also ==
- Homo floresiensis
