= Mike Morwood =

Australian archaeologist (1950–2013)

- Michael John Morwood
- Born: 27 October 1950; Auckland, New Zealand
- Died: 23 July 2013 (aged 62); Darwin, Australia
- Education: University of Auckland
- Known for: Homo floresiensis "hobbit" discovery

Professor Michael John Morwood (27 October 1950 – 23 July 2013) was a New Zealand archaeologist best known for discovering Homo floresiensis. In 2012, he received the Rhys Jones Medal by the Australian Archaeological Association.

== Biography ==
Morwood was born in Auckland and grew up in New Zealand. He was awarded his Bachelor of Arts in Archaeology at the University of Auckland, New Zealand, in 1973, receiving his Masters in the following year. In 1972 the Auckland University Department of Anthropology awarded him the Anthropology Prize for academic excellence. He commenced further graduate studies in 1976 at the Australian National University. He was awarded his PhD in 1980. His dissertation was titled "Art and stone: towards a prehistory of central-western Queensland" (Mike Morwood 2010).

The majority of Morwood's research was undertaken while he was a member of staff at the University of New England, Armidale. His final post was as professor at the School of Earth and Environmental Studies, University of Wollongong.

Morwood began his career employed as Regional Archaeologist by the Queensland State Archaeology Branch of the Department of Aboriginal and Islander Affairs (DAIA) between 1974 and 1976. After receiving his doctorate he returned to the DAIA in Queensland as a Field and Research Archaeologist.

In 1981 he began lecturing at the University of New England. As a part of the School of Human Environmental Studies, Morwood lectured in: Australian Archaeology, Southeast Asian and Pacific Archaeology, Rock Art, Archaeological Field Methods, and Archaeological Lab Methods.

It was during this time he discovered Homo floresiensis, a hominin species that "…prompted reassessment of fundamental tenets in palaeoanthropology ... concerning the peripheral role of Asia in early hominin evolution" (Morwood 2011). He initially joined a project by a group of Dutch and Indonesian researchers led by Paul Sondaar (1934-2003), who followed up on discoveries in the 1950s and 60s by Theodor Verhoeven (1907-1990) on ancient human occupation in Wallacea. Despite bitter complaints by the Dutch scientists, Morwood took over the project. In 2003 the excavation team discovered what was to be named a new species, Homo floresiensis in the limestone cave of Liang Bua (first excavated by Verhoeven), on the Indonesian island of Flores. Morwood also produced important work on rock art, most notably his book, Visions of the Past:The archaeology of Australian Aboriginal art. His approach here was to integrate excavated and rock art evidence to produce a rounded interpretation of the past.

Morwood moved to the University of Wollongong in 2007 where he was a professor at the School of Earth and Environmental Studies. His research interests included the archaeology of Southeast Asia and Australia, early hominin evolution and dispersals, the origins of modern humans, rock art, Southeast Asian biogeography, and ethno-archaeology. He took it as a challenge that scientists communicate with public audiences, and in the last decade or so he communicated much of his research to the public.

Morwood was elected President of the Australian Rock Art Research Association in 1992, a position he held until 2000. In 2003, he was elected a Fellow of the Australian Academy of the Humanities; an organisation dedicated to the advancement of knowledge in humanities. Other professional positions he held include: Professorial Fellow Archaeology in the School of Earth and Environmental Studies at the University of Wollongong, between 2007 and 2013; Adjunct Professorial Fellow at the University of Western Australia between 2009 and 2010; Adjunct Professorial Fellow at the University of New England, from 2009; Adjunct Professorial Fellow at Charles Darwin University, from 2009; and Adjunct Professorial Fellow at Padjadrang University, Bandung, from 2010.

== Major accomplishments ==
Models for the early hominin dispersal out of Africa received considerable attention when the joint Australian-Indonesian research team headed by Morwood and Thomas Sutikna discovered Homo floresiensis in the Liang Bua cave on the island of Flores, Indonesia (Morwood & Oosterzee 2007). The finding of Homo floresiensis, released on 28 October 2004, has implications for the dispersal of hominin and human dispersal out of Africa, and the colonisation of Asia. It has attracted substantial debate from, in part, supporters of the multi-regionalist theory of Homo sapiens evolution (Morwood). The continued study of Homo floresiensis has taken a multidisciplinary approach including palaeanthropological, morphological (see Kaif et al. 2011), and pathological analysis combined with dentition study, ancient DNA extraction and tomographical techniques. Of additional interest to the find are the lithic tools associated with the discovery of Homo floresiensis and the cognitive behaviours connected with their manufacture and use (Brumm et al. 2006). Recent research estimates the faunal sequence and minimum age for hominins on Flores at 1.1million years ago, ensuring the study covers the entire period of hominin habitation in the region. Excavations at Mata Menge, Flores, hope to provide greater evidence on the early hominin colonisation of the Indonesian area. The public interest in these hominin finds have sparked numerous documentaries and written works detailing all manner of scientific investigation and discussion on the subject.

More recent multinational research projects have identified the interactions of human activity, the local environment, climates and island faunas in long-term changes in Indonesia. The implications for island biogeography and evolution can be seen extending throughout significant periods of time. A collaborative project, with funding from the Australian Research Council, involving Indigenous communities, the University of New England, the Australian National University, the W.A. Department of Environment and Conservation, the Kimberley Foundation and Heliwork, is looking at the complex cultural sequences resulting from human occupation and the impacts on faunal habitation through investigating the distribution, chronology and subject matter of cultural heritage sites. The research being conducted in the Kimberly region of Australia may provide evidence of the effect of environmental and cultural alteration as a result of climate change and human habitation in the area (Professor Michael "Mike" Morwood 2011).

Morwood's innovations in on-site field data recovery include the adaptation of shoring techniques found on industrial construction sites that are well suited for deep excavations. In addition, he developed effective wet-sieving techniques that greatly improved finds recovery from excavated material. He is known for his use of an intelligent database design for recording excavated materials and the documentation of site contexts. Morwood's experience in directing large scale projects has ensured the success of collaborative projects between local Government agencies, research centres and interdisciplinary organisations, both in Australia and Indonesia.

Morwood died on 23 July 2013, in Darwin, Australia, in the company of his wife, Francine and his daughter, Catherine. He was also survived by his first wife, Kathryn.

- This entry is based on Andrew Wilkinson's (2013) entry on Mike Morwood in the Encyclopedia of Global Archaeology, with additions by Smith.
