= Rampasasa =

Group of families in Flores, Indonesia

Coordinates: 8°32′S 120°27′E

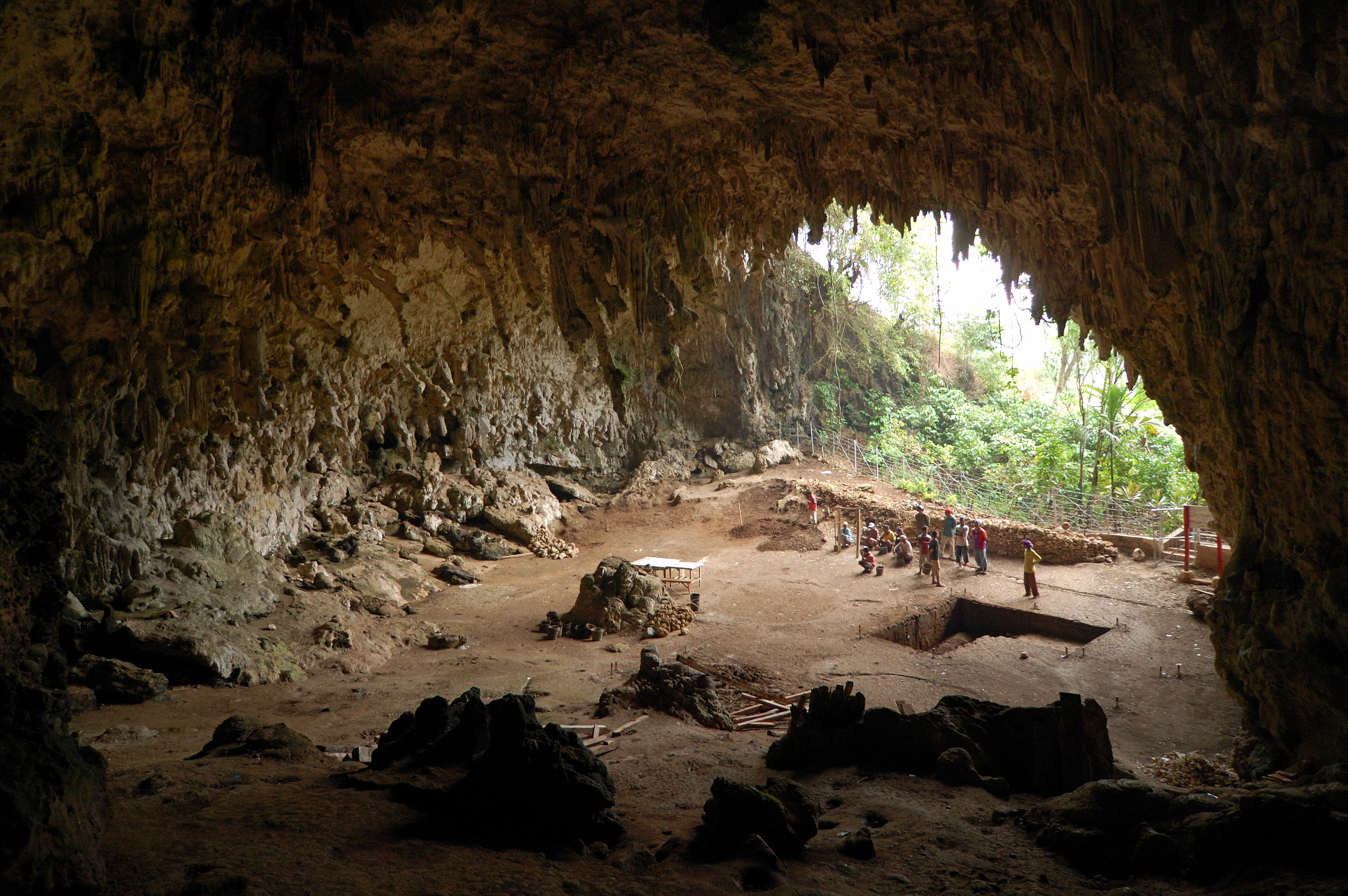
Cave where the remains of Homo floresiensis were discovered in 2003, Liang Bua, Flores, Indonesia, 2007.

Rampasasa pygmies is a name given to a group of families described as pygmoid or Negrito, native to Waemulu Village in Wae Rii District, Manggarai Regency, Flores, East Nusa Tenggara, Indonesia, following the discovery of Homo floresiensis in the nearby Liang Bua cave in 2003.

The Rampasasa have since been reported as claiming Homo floresiensis as their ancestor and as "cashing in on hobbit craze".

A genetic study published in 2018 discounted the possibility of the Rampasasa descending from H. floresiensis, concluding that 'multiple independent instances of hominin insular dwarfism occurred on Flores'. However, as no genetic material from H. floresiensis was included in the analyses, any truly definitive conclusions cannot be made.
