= Mata Menge =

- Location within Indonesia
- 8°41′31″S 121°05′43″E
- Type: open-air site
- Periods: early Middle Pleistocene
- Location: Flores, Indonesia
- Region: So'a Basin

Site notes
- Excavation dates: 1991-1992, 1994, 2004-2009, 2010-2012, 2013-2019
- Archaeologists: Theodor Verhoeven, Mike Morwood

Mata Menge is an early Middle Pleistocene paleoanthropological site located in the Ola Bula Formation in the So'a Basin on the island of Flores, Indonesia. Lithic artefacts and hominin remains have been discovered at the site. The level of sophistication of the Mata Menge lithic artefacts is described as being 'simple'.

== Excavations ==
Excavation Timeline	Excavators	Recovered Items & Remains	Animal
1957-1970	Theodor Verhoeven	Stone artifacts	Stegodon florensis
1992-1994	Indonesian-Dutch Team	Stone artifacts	Stegodon florensis, Rat, Crocodile
1997	Indonesian-Australian Team	-	Stegodon florensis
2004-2009	Indonesian-Australian Team	Stone artifacts	mixed faunal remains
2010-2012	Indonesian-Australian Team led by Mike Morwood	Stone artifacts	mixed faunal remains
2013-ongoing	Indonesian-Australian Team	Hominin fossils & stone artifacts	Mixed faunal remains

=== Stone artifacts ===
Stone artifacts make up the majority of what has been recovered from Mata Menge, most of the stone artifact evidence points towards use by the hominin H. floresiensis. The excavation by the Indonesian-Australian team in the period between 2004 and 2009 saw the excavation of over 507 stone artifacts. The stone artifacts were compared to others recovered in the 1994 excavation done by the Indonesian-Dutch team. The assemblage is regarded as the most reputable and well-handled set of Early Pleistocene items found on a southeast Asian Island.

The stone tool artifacts found at the site were made using the simple method of breaking off smaller flakes from what is called a "core", essentially a larger piece of stone that is formed into one or multiple different tools. Volcanic materials were believed to have been used for these types of stone tools and due to the environmental history of the area, these materials were in abundance. Other material items found at the site were 27 fine-grained chert, 13 chalcedony, and 4 chlorite as well as 4 opal artifacts.

The majority of the flakes left behind from the core stones were believed to have been ignored after they were broken from the main piece, but some evidence of smaller ware on the larger flakes found could indicate the flakes being used as more precise tools, and evidence-based on the stone cores show the tools being made in one place and then carried with the hominin to another.

The evidence provided by the stone tools opened the possibility of hominin activity at Mata Menge. The similarities of the stone artifacts found at the Mata Menge site compared to those found at the Liang Bua site were close enough to consider evidence of H. floresiensis at Mata Menge as well. Later on, this would be confirmed in the 2014 excavation where hominin remains were found from a layer 10 meter higher in the sequence.

=== Faunal remains ===
The fossil remains of Stegodon florensis, Hooijeromys, Varanus komodoensis, crocodile, various birds and freshwater mollusks were also unearthed, from both fossil-bearing intervals at Mata Menge.

== Hominin fossils ==
In October 2014, the fossil remains of an early hominin were discovered at the site in the upper fossil-bearing interval at Mata Menge. A mandible and six teeth were discovered. The hominin fossils belonged to at least three distinct individuals, including 2 children. The hominin fossils were dated to around 700,000 BP, making the Mata Menge fossils the oldest hominin fossils yet discovered on the island of Flores. The fossils at Mata Menge are likely to belong to hominins that resulted from the effects of insular dwarfism working on Homo erectus.

47 lithic artefacts were discovered in the layer containing the hominin fossils. The remains of Stegodon florensis, Hooijeromys, Komodo dragon and crocodile were also discovered in the layer associated with the hominin fossil remains.

=== Comparison to H. floresiensis ===
Hominin fossils at Mata Menge, in particular the mandible, are smaller than those of Homo floresiensis. The size and shape of the teeth of the Mata Menge fossils are similar to those of H. floresiensis, but the Mata Menge fossils are more primitive. The lithic artefacts at Mata Menge also show cultural similarities to those found at Liang Bua. The similarities in lithic artefacts and hominin fossil remains suggest that the hominins at Mata Menge were likely ancestral to H. floresiensis.

== Environmental effects at Mata Menge ==
=== Volcanic activity ===
Evidence from Mata Menge suggests that the area saw much volcanic activity that has affected items found at the excavation sites over the years. During successive excavations at Mata Menge, principal investigator Gert van den Bergh and colleagues determined that fluvial fossil-bearing Layer II of the site was covered by a more than 6 m thick interval of clay-rich mudflow deposits. The artifacts, faunal remains, including those being hominin in origin are believed to have been exposed at the surface for some time due to evidence of weathering, before then, being moved by a small stream and subsequently rapidly covered by a succession of mud flows overtime. These mudflows may have been caused by volcanic activity inside the Welas Caldera to the north of Mata Menge, in which a lake had formed.

== Bibliography ==
- Brumm, Adam; Aziz, Fachroel; et al. (Jun 1, 2006). "Early stone technology on Flores and its implications for Homo floresiensis". Nature. 441 (7093): 624–8. doi:10.1038/nature04618. PMID 16738657. S2CID 4396093.
- Brumm, Adam; W. Moore, Mark; et al. (September 9, 2009). "Stone technology at the Middle Pleistocene site of Mata Menge, Flores, Indonesia". Journal of Archaeological Science. 37 (3): 451–473. doi:10.1016/j.jas.2009.09.012.
- Brumm, Adam; van den Bergh, Gerrit D.; et al. (Jun 9, 2016). "Age and context of the oldest known hominin fossils from Flores" (PDF). Nature. 534 (7606): 249–253. doi:10.1038/nature17663. PMID 27279222. S2CID 28608179.
- Morwood, M.J.; Aziz, F.; et al. (1997). "Stone artefacts from the 1994 excavation at Mata Menge, West Central Flores, Indonesia". Australian Archaeology. 44: 26–34. doi:10.1080/03122417.1997.11681587.
- van den Bergh, Gerrit D.; Kaifu, Yousuke; et al. (Jun 9, 2016). "Homo floresiensis-like fossils from the early Middle Pleistocene of Flores". Nature. 534 (7606): 245–248. doi:10.1038/nature17999. PMID 27279221. S2CID 205249218.
- van den Bergh, Gerrit D.; Alloway, Brent; et al. (Sep 14, 2022). "An integrative geochronological framework for the Pleistocene So'a Basin (Flores, Indonesia) and its implications for fauna turnover and hominin arrival". Quaternary Science Reviews. 294 107721. doi:10.1016/j.quascirev.2022.107721. hdl:10072/418777. S2CID 205249218.
