= Thomas Sutikna =

Thomas Sutikna (2026)

Thomas Sutikna (born November 16, 1963) is an Indonesian archaeologist and paleoanthropologist. He became best known in academic circles for the discovery of Homo floresiensis in the Liang Bua cave on the island of Flores. During an excavation led by him and Mike Morwood, at first a skull was uncovered in September 2003, followed by the nearly complete skeleton of a small-statured individual belonging to a previously unknown species of the genus Homo.

== Biography ==
Thomas Sutikna was born in Gunung Kidul Regency, Yogyakarta) and grew up in Baleharjo. He attended Kanisius 2 Elementary School in Baleharjo and then Kanisius I Middle School in Wonosari. He continued his education from 1983 to 1990 at Sebelas Maret University in Surakarta, where he studied Ancient history in the Faculty of Literature and Culture. He taught himself archaeology and was eventually introduced by a friend to one of the pioneers of Indonesian archaeology, Raden Panji Soejono. At the time, RP Soejono was working as a senior researcher at the National Archaeology Research Institute (Pusat Penelitian Arkeologi Nasional, Puslit Arkenas) and hired him as an assistant in 1993. After numerous trips to archaeological excavation sites, Sutikna began a master's program in archaeology at the Faculty of Cultural Studies at the University of Indonesia in 1997. After completing his master's degree, he was offered a position by the National Archaeology Research Institute to join Mike Morwood's team as co-director, which began exploring the Liang Bua Cave in 2001 as part of a joint project between Puslit Arkenas and the University of New England (Australia).

In 2016, Thomas Sutikna earned his Doctor of Philosophy degree from the University of Wollongong (Australia). From 2016 to 2019, he conducted research as a postdoc, awarded the Michael J. Morwood Fellow scholarship, at the University of Wollongong. Since then, he has been an archaeologist and senior researcher at the Indonesian National Research and Innovation Agency (Badan Riset dan Inovasi Nasional, BRIN) in Jakarta.
