= Buhler's coryphomys =

Conservation status
- Extinct (IUCN 3.1)

Scientific classification
- Kingdom: Animalia
- Phylum: Chordata
- Class: Mammalia
- Order: Rodentia
- Family: Muridae
- Genus: †Coryphomys
- Species: †C. buehleri

Binomial name
- †Coryphomys buehleri Schaub, 1937

Extinct species of rodent

Buhler's coryphomys (Coryphomys buehleri) is an extinct species of giant rat. It is known only from sub-fossil fragments that were found on Timor Island, Indonesia. It is related to the murines of New Guinea. Only subfossil fragments have been found to this day and were found in limestone caves in Indonesian West Timor. There is no precise information regarding the time of extinction or the cause of extinction.
