= Müller's giant Sunda rat =

Conservation status
- Least Concern (IUCN 3.1)

Scientific classification
- Kingdom: Animalia
- Phylum: Chordata
- Class: Mammalia
- Order: Rodentia
- Family: Muridae
- Genus: Sundamys
- Species: S. muelleri

Binomial name
- Sundamys muelleri (Jentink, 1879)
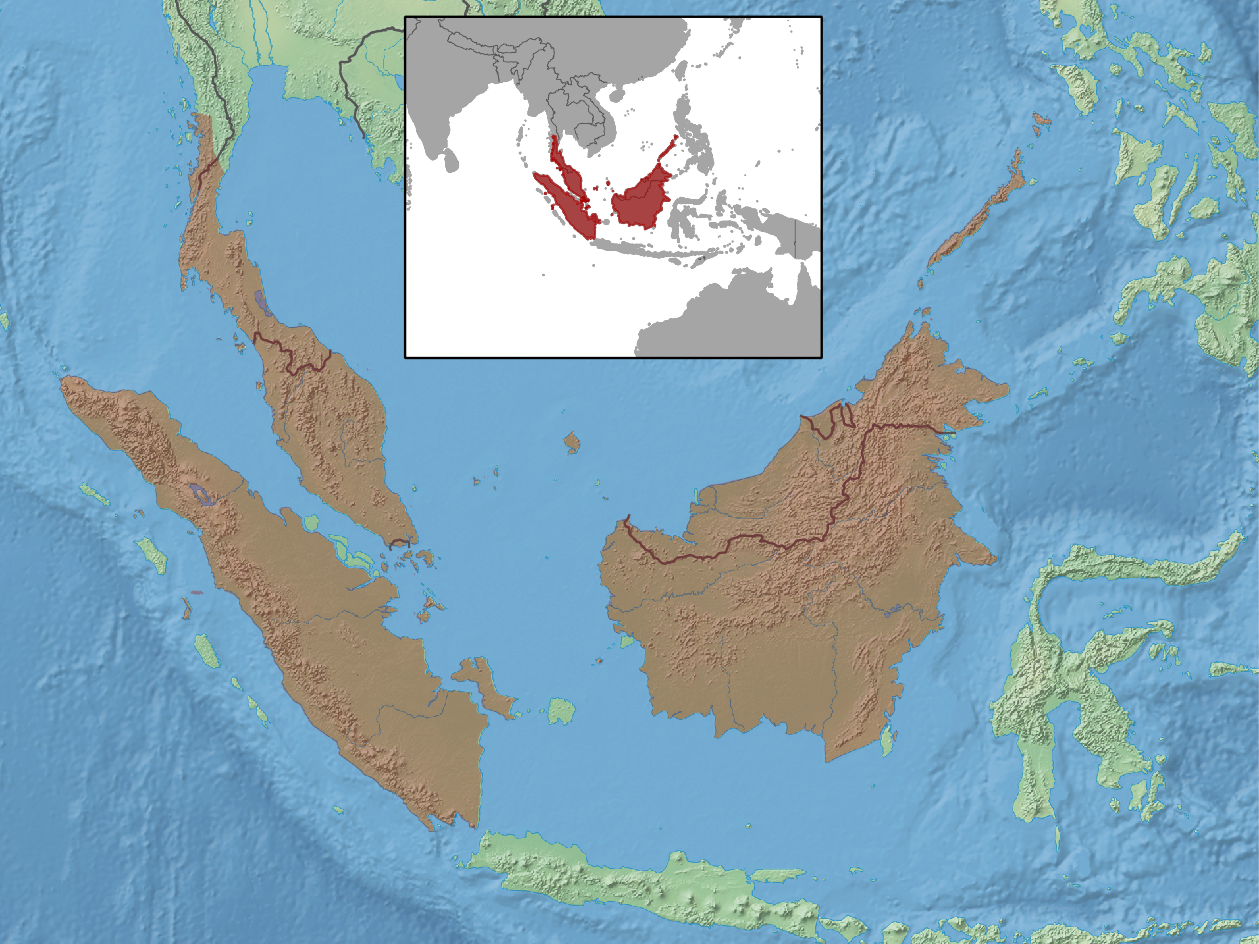

Species of rodent

Müller's giant Sunda rat (Sundamys muelleri) is a species of rodent in the family Muridae. It is found in Indonesia, Malaysia, Myanmar, the Philippines, and Thailand.
