= Paulamys =

Conservation status
- Endangered (IUCN 3.1)

Scientific classification
- Kingdom: Animalia
- Phylum: Chordata
- Class: Mammalia
- Order: Rodentia
- Family: Muridae
- Tribe: Rattini
- Genus: Paulamys; Musser, 1986
- Species: P. naso

Binomial name
- Paulamys naso (Musser, 1981)

Species of rodent

Paulamys is a genus of rat. Its only known member is Paulamys naso, a species endemic to Flores Island, Indonesia. Paulamys naso was first described from subfossil fragments collected in the 1950s by Theodor Verhoeven and was named Floresomys naso by Guy Musser in 1981. Since Floresomys was preoccupied, Musser changed the name to Paulamys, after Verhoeven's life partner Paula Hamerlinck. A living specimen was reported from the montane forest of western Flores in 1989. It is recorded as common between 1,000 and 2,000 m (3,280 and 6,560 ft) above sea level on the volcanic mountain Gunung Ranakah, but is believed to be threatened by habitat destruction. It is thought to prefer closed habitats.

The Flores murid genera Papagomys, Komodomys and Paulamys are more closely related to each other than to other murids, suggesting an adaptive radiation. It is a relatively small-sized species, with a body mass of around 100–200 grams (0.22–0.44 lb) It is suggested to be an omnivore, consuming fungus and invertebrates, and to engage in burrowing.
