= Kenneth Peter Aplin =

Australian zoologist (1958–2019)

- Born: 9 October 1958
- Died: January 2019 (aged 60)
- Education: Australian National University, University of New South Wales
- Known for: Marsupial systematics; Australasian mammals and reptiles
- Scientific career
- Fields: Zoology, Mammalogy, Herpetology, Paleontology
- Workplaces: Western Australian Museum, CSIRO, Smithsonian Institution

Kenneth Peter Aplin (9 October 1958 – January 2019) was an Australian zoologist whose research focused on mammalogy, herpetology and paleontology, particularly the systematics and evolution of Australasian vertebrates.

== Biography ==
Aplin studied archaeology at the Australian National University, where he graduated with a Bachelor of Arts in 1981. He later turned to biology and earned a PhD from the University of New South Wales in 1990 with a dissertation entitled Basicranial regions of diprotodontian marsupials: anatomy, ontogeny and phylogeny.

During the 1980s, Aplin conducted paleontological research with Mike Archer at the Riversleigh fossil site in Queensland. In 1987, he published a detailed study on the basicranial anatomy of the extinct Miocene marsupial Wynyardia bassiana, followed the same year by the influential synthesis Recent advances in marsupial systematics with a new syncretic classification, which remains a standard reference in marsupial taxonomy.

From 1989 to 2000, Aplin served as curator of terrestrial vertebrates at the Western Australian Museum. He subsequently worked as a wildlife biologist with the rodent research group of the Commonwealth Scientific and Industrial Research Organisation (CSIRO) from 2001 to 2004, and as a researcher at the Australian National Wildlife Collection from 2004 to 2011. From 2011 onward, he worked as an independent consultant and was also affiliated with the mammal division of the Smithsonian Institution in Washington, D.C.

== Taxonomic work ==
Aplin was the describing author of numerous extant and fossil animal taxa. These include the carnivorous marsupial Pseudantechinus roryi; rodents such as Rattus timorensis, Mallomys gunung, and Mallomys istapantap; reptiles including blind snakes of the genus Anilios, skinks, geckos, legless lizards, and monitor lizards; and amphibians such as Litoria exophthalmia. In 1987, he established the marsupial family Acrobatidae, separating feathertail gliders from the Burramyidae. He also described several fossil species, including Coryphomys musseri and Protemnodon nombe.

== Publications ==
In addition to numerous scientific articles, Aplin contributed to major reference works, including The Mammals of Australia (2008) and the chapters on Acrobatidae and Notoryctidae in volume 5 of the Handbook of the Mammals of the World (2015).

== Eponyms ==
Several species have been named in Aplin's honour, including the marsupial Microperoryctes aplini (2004), the extinct rodent Alormys aplini (2018), the frog Litoria aplini (2020), and the snake Stegonotus aplini (2021).
