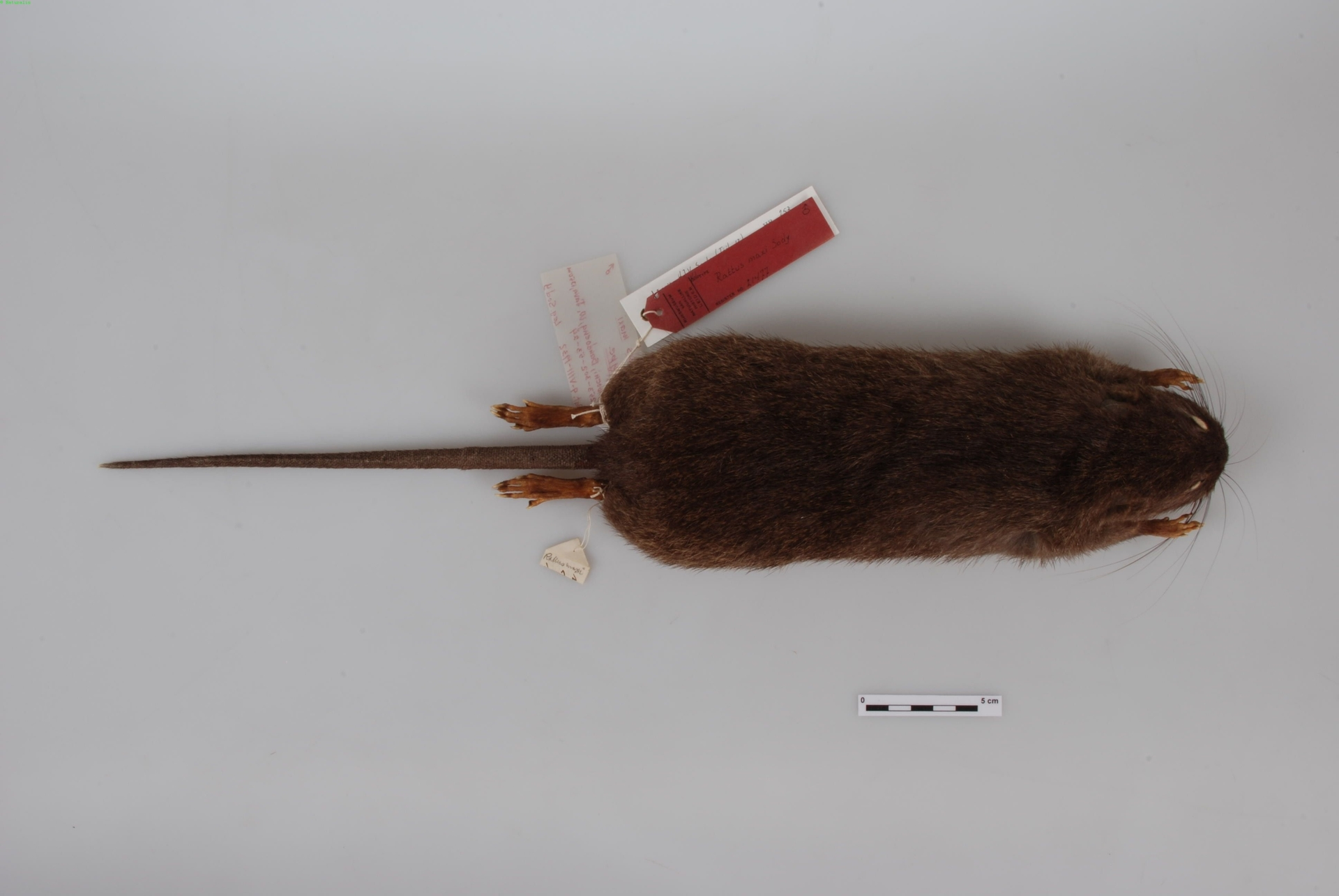

Conservation status
- Vulnerable (IUCN 3.1)

Scientific classification
- Kingdom: Animalia
- Phylum: Chordata
- Class: Mammalia
- Order: Rodentia
- Family: Muridae
- Genus: Sundamys
- Species: S. maxi

Binomial name
- Sundamys maxi (Sody, 1932)
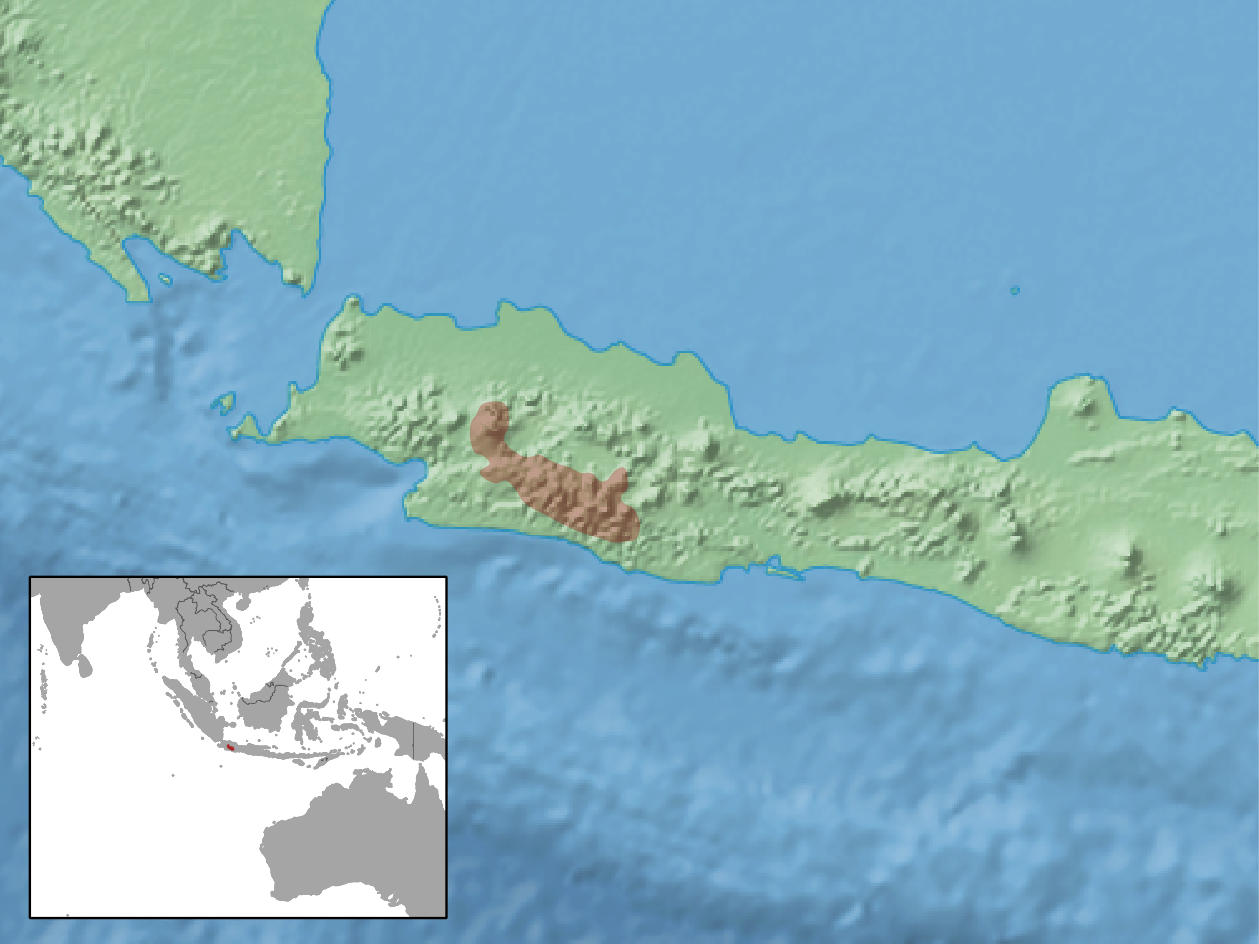

= Bartels's rat =

Species of rodent

Bartels's rat (Sundamys maxi) is a species of rodent in the family Muridae. It is found only in West Java, Indonesia, including in Gunung Gede Pangrango National Park.
