= Subalpine woolly rat =

Conservation status
- Least Concern (IUCN 3.1)

Scientific classification
- Kingdom: Animalia
- Phylum: Chordata
- Class: Mammalia
- Order: Rodentia
- Family: Muridae
- Genus: Mallomys
- Species: M. istapantap

Binomial name
- Mallomys istapantap Flannery, Aplin, Groves & Adams, 1989

Species of rodent

The subalpine woolly rat (Mallomys istapantap) is a species of rodent in the family Muridae. It is found in West Papua, Indonesia and Papua New Guinea.
