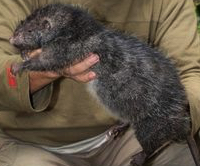

Conservation status
- Endangered (IUCN 3.1)

Scientific classification
- Kingdom: Animalia
- Phylum: Chordata
- Class: Mammalia
- Order: Rodentia
- Family: Muridae
- Genus: Mallomys
- Species: M. gunung

Binomial name
- Mallomys gunung Flannery, Aplin, Groves & Adams, 1989

= Alpine woolly rat =

Species of rodent

The alpine woolly rat (Mallomys gunung) is a species of rodent in the family Muridae. It is found only in West Papua, Indonesia. It is found only at high elevations, has an extent of occurrence less than 5,000 km^{2}, and is known from only two localities (although may be present at more). The combination of hunting, predation, and slow breeding means that the population size is probably declining (has certainly declined substantially according to the Holocene fossil records). This species is very likely to be increasingly affected by global warming, which increases fire frequency and is causing the extent of habitat to decline. When specimens were brought to a museum the female rats were pregnant with only one baby, so it is assumed that the rat gives birth to only one offspring at a time.

Because very little is known about the Alpine woolly rat, its diet is assumed to be similar to that of a typical wild rats, barring climate variations.

The Alpine woolly rat mainly eats plants, seeds and various small animals.
