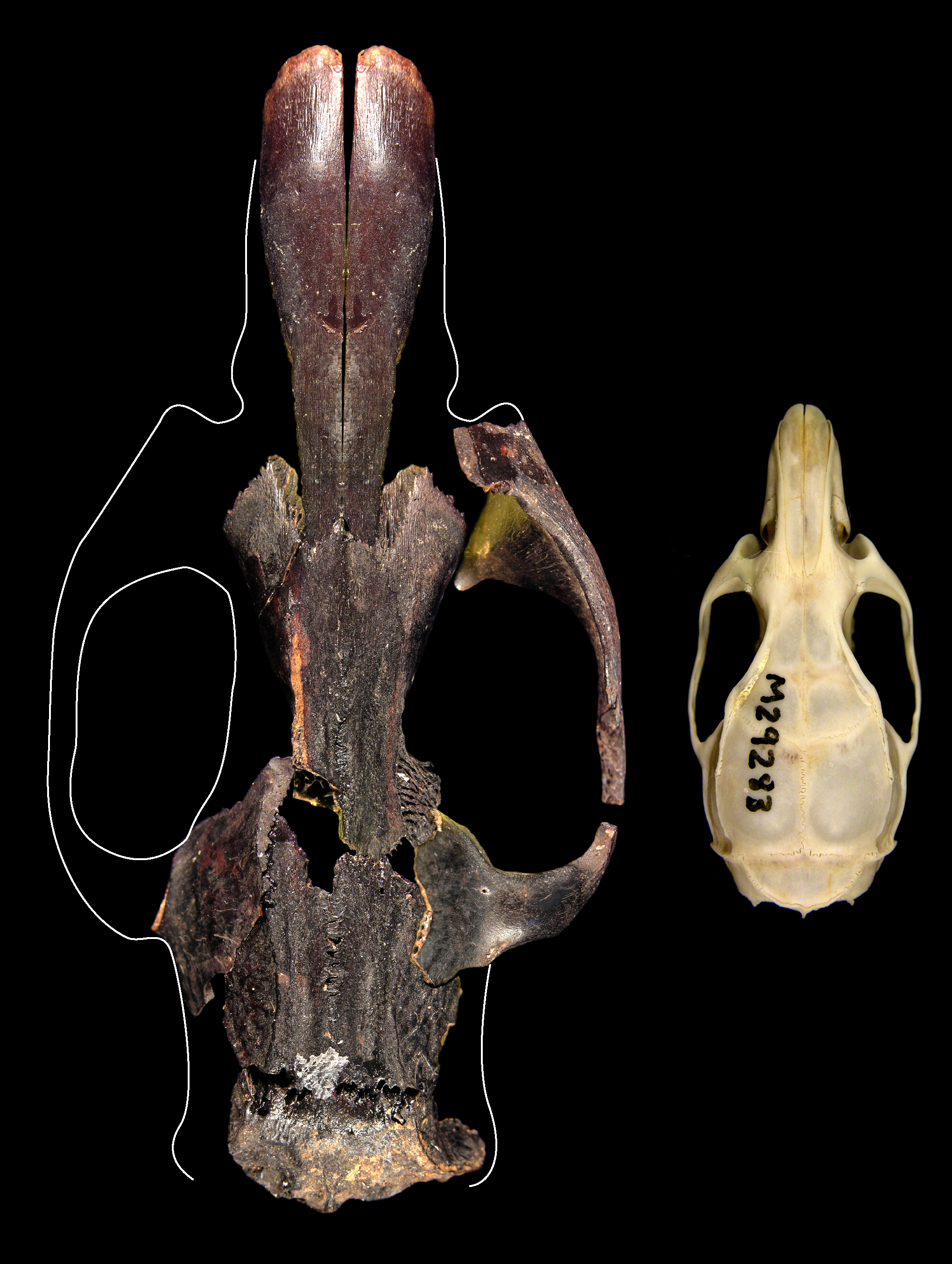
- The skull of a black rat (right) compared with a fairly complete skull of a specimen of the extinct Coryphomys musseri (left).

Scientific classification
- Kingdom: Animalia
- Phylum: Chordata
- Class: Mammalia
- Order: Rodentia
- Family: Muridae
- Genus: †Coryphomys
- Species: †C. musseri

Binomial name
- †Coryphomys musseri Aplin & Helgen, 2010

= Timor giant rat =

Extinct species of rodent

The Timor giant rat (Coryphomys musseri) is an extinct species of giant rat described in 2010. It is known only from sub-fossils that were found on Timor Island, Indonesia. It is related to the murines of New Guinea. Archaeological research on East Timor has revealed the bones of rats weighing up to 6 kilograms (13.2 pounds) when adult.

In 2015, the discovery of fossils of "seven new species of giant rat", including the "largest rat ever" on the island of East Timor was announced. The biggest of these rats was described as weighing "five kilos (11 pounds), the size of a small dog," and was referred to as the "Giant Rat" in news stories.

== Extinction ==
They seem to have died out between 1000 and 2000 years ago (around 1-1000 AD), perhaps due to large-scale forest clearance for farming. Humans, who first settled in Timor around 46,000 years ago, would have also probably eaten these rats as a delicacy, which may have been a factor towards their extinction. C. musseri was probably endangered by 1 AD and it was extinct by 1000 AD.
