= De Vis's woolly rat =

Conservation status
- Least Concern (IUCN 3.1)

Scientific classification
- Kingdom: Animalia
- Phylum: Chordata
- Class: Mammalia
- Order: Rodentia
- Family: Muridae
- Genus: Mallomys
- Species: M. aroaensis

Binomial name
- Mallomys aroaensis (De Vis, 1907)

Species of rodent

De Vis's woolly rat (Mallomys aroaensis) is a species of rodent in the family Muridae. It is found only in Papua New Guinea.
