= Annandale's rat =

Conservation status
- Least Concern (IUCN 3.1)

Scientific classification
- Kingdom: Animalia
- Phylum: Chordata
- Class: Mammalia
- Order: Rodentia
- Family: Muridae
- Genus: Sundamys
- Species: S. annandalei

Binomial name
- Sundamys annandalei (Bonhote, 1903)

Species of rodent

Annandale's rat (Sundamys annandalei) is a species of rodent in the family Muridae. It is found in Indonesia (Sumatra), Peninsular Malaysia, and Singapore. It was classified as Rattus annandalei until 2017, but mitochondrial and nuclear DNA show that it belongs to the rat genus Sundamys.
