= Rothschild's woolly rat =

Conservation status
- Least Concern (IUCN 3.1)

Scientific classification
- Kingdom: Animalia
- Phylum: Chordata
- Class: Mammalia
- Order: Rodentia
- Family: Muridae
- Genus: Mallomys
- Species: M. rothschildi

Binomial name
- Mallomys rothschildi Thomas, 1898

Species of rodent

Rothschild's woolly rat (Mallomys rothschildi) is a species of rodent in the family Muridae. It is found on the island of New Guinea: both in the West Papua region of Indonesia and Papua New Guinea.

The species has been known to eat karuka nuts (Pandanus julianettii), and growers will put platforms or other obstacles on the trunks of the trees to keep the pests out.

== Names ==
It is known as mosak, aloñ, kabkal, or maklek in the Kalam language of Papua New Guinea.
