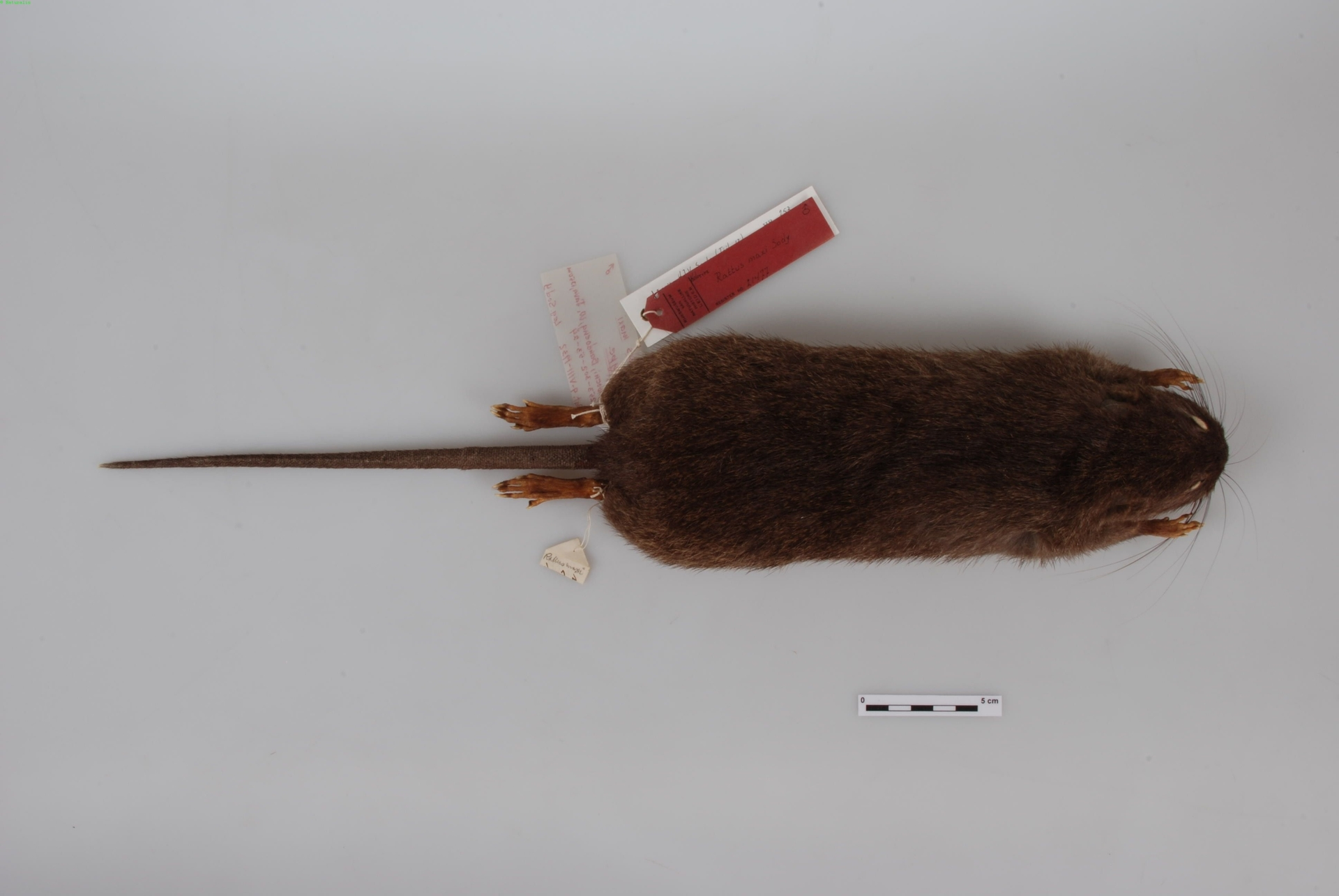
- Sundamys maxi

Scientific classification
- Kingdom: Animalia
- Phylum: Chordata
- Class: Mammalia
- Order: Rodentia
- Family: Muridae
- Tribe: Rattini
- Genus: Sundamys; Musser & Newcomb, 1983

Type species
- Mus muelleri

Species
- Sundamys annandalei Sundamys infraluteus Sundamys maxi Sundamys muelleri

= Sundamys =

Genus of rodents

Sundamys is a genus of rodent in the Muridae family, mostly in Indonesia and Malaysia. It contains the following species:

- Annandale's rat (Sundamys annandalei)
- Mountain giant Sunda rat (Sundamys infraluteus)
- Bartel's rat (Sundamys maxi)
- Müller's giant Sunda rat (Sundamys muelleri)
