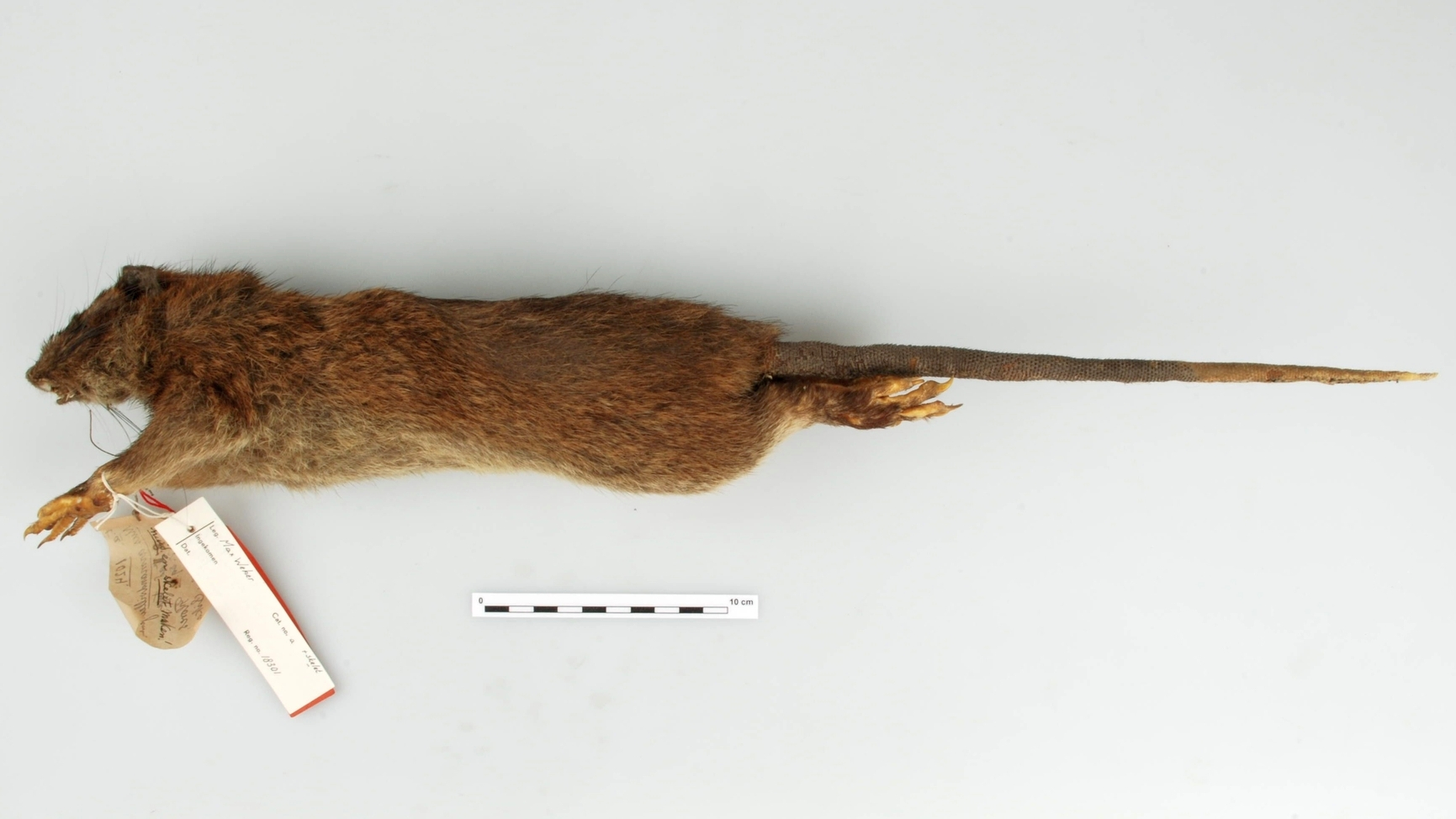
- Stuffed specimen of Papagomys armandvillei

Scientific classification
- Kingdom: Animalia
- Phylum: Chordata
- Class: Mammalia
- Order: Rodentia
- Family: Muridae
- Tribe: Rattini
- Genus: Papagomys; Sody, 1941

Species
- Papagomys armandvillei †Papagomys theodorverhoeveni

= Papagomys =

Papagomys Temporal range: Late Pleistocene–Recent

Genus of rodents

Papagomys is a genus of very large rats in the tribe Rattini of the subfamily Murinae, with body masses of 600–2,500 grams (1.3–5.5 lb). It contains two species, which are known only from the Indonesian island of Flores:

- Flores giant rat Papagomys armandvillei
- Verhoeven's giant rat Papagomys theodorverhoeveni (possibly extinct, only known from subfossil remains)

A possible unnamed third species is also known from subfossil remains.

Both species have records extending to the early Late Pleistocene. The species are thought to be terrestrial, preferring closed habitats, with P. armandvillei known to engage in burrowing. They are thought to be omnivores, consuming leaves, fruit and invertebrates.

== See also ==
- Mallomys a genus of giant rat known from New Guinea

== Literature cited ==
- Aplin, K.P. and Helgen, K.M. 2010. Quaternary murid rodents of Timor. Part I: New material of Coryphomys buehleri Schaub, 1937, and description of a second species of the genus. Bulletin of the American Museum of Natural History 341:1–80.
- Musser, G. G.; Carleton, M. D. (2005). "Superfamily Muroidea". In Wilson, D. E.; Reeder, D. M. (eds.). Mammal Species of the World: A Taxonomic and Geographic Reference (3rd ed.). Johns Hopkins University Press. p. 1430. ISBN 978-0-8018-8221-0. OCLC 62265494.
- Zijlstra, J.S., Hoek Ostende, L.W. van den and Due, R.A. 2008. Verhoeven's giant rat of Flores (Papagomys theodorverhoeveni, Muridae) extinct after all? Contributions to Zoology 77(1):25–31.
