= Liang Bua =

Cave and archaeological site in Indonesia

Coordinates: 8°32′03″S 120°27′37″E

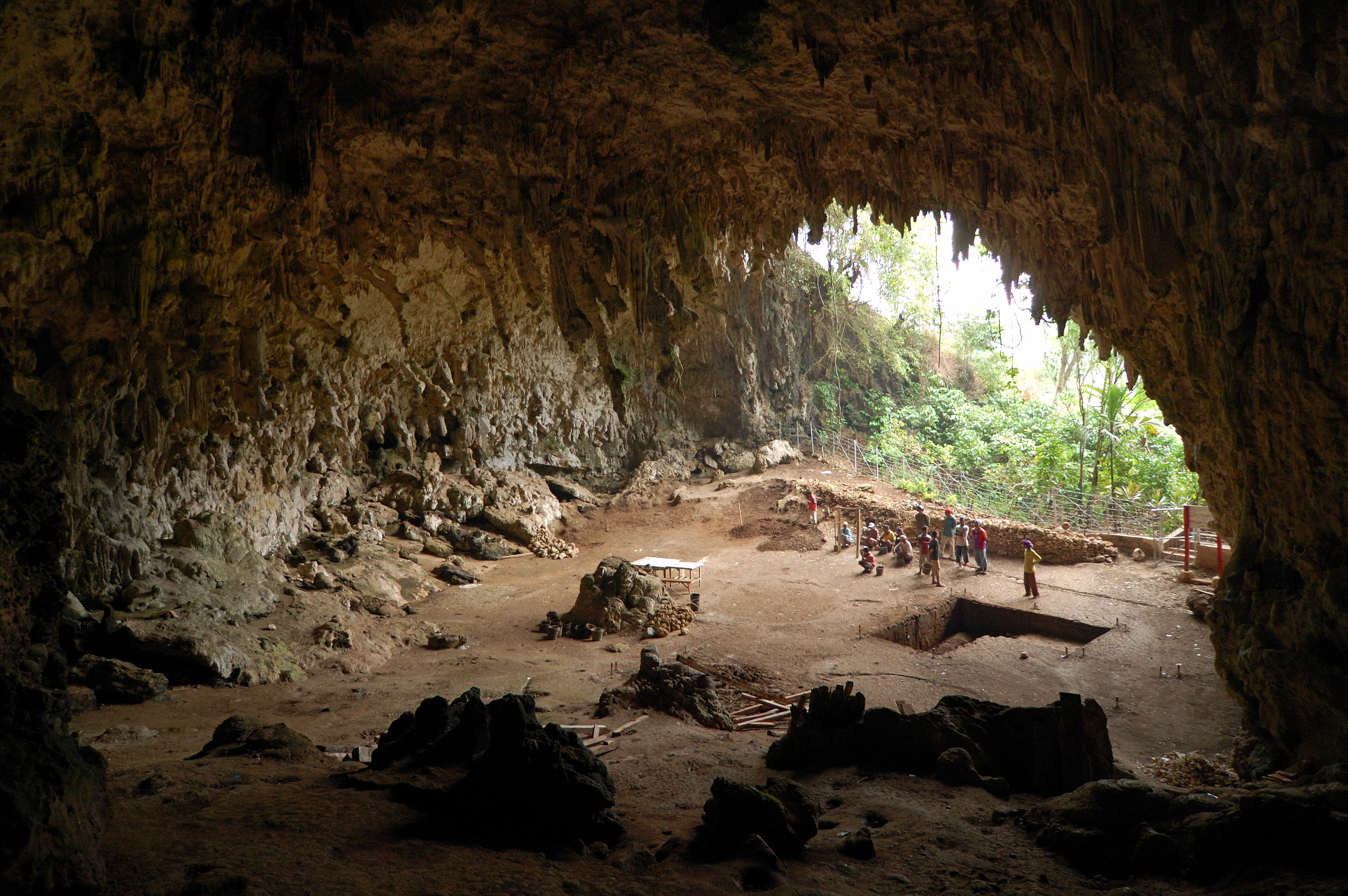
- Cave where the remains of Homo floresiensis were found
- Interactive map of Liang Bua
- Location: Flores, East Nusa Tenggara, Indonesia
- Length: 50 meters
- Discovery: 1950s
- Geology: Limestone
- Entrances: 1

Liang Bua is a limestone cave on the island of Flores, Indonesia, slightly north of the town of Ruteng in Manggarai Regency, East Nusa Tenggara. The cave demonstrated archaeological and paleontological potential in the 1950s and 1960s as described by the Dutch missionary and archaeologist Theodor L. Verhoeven.

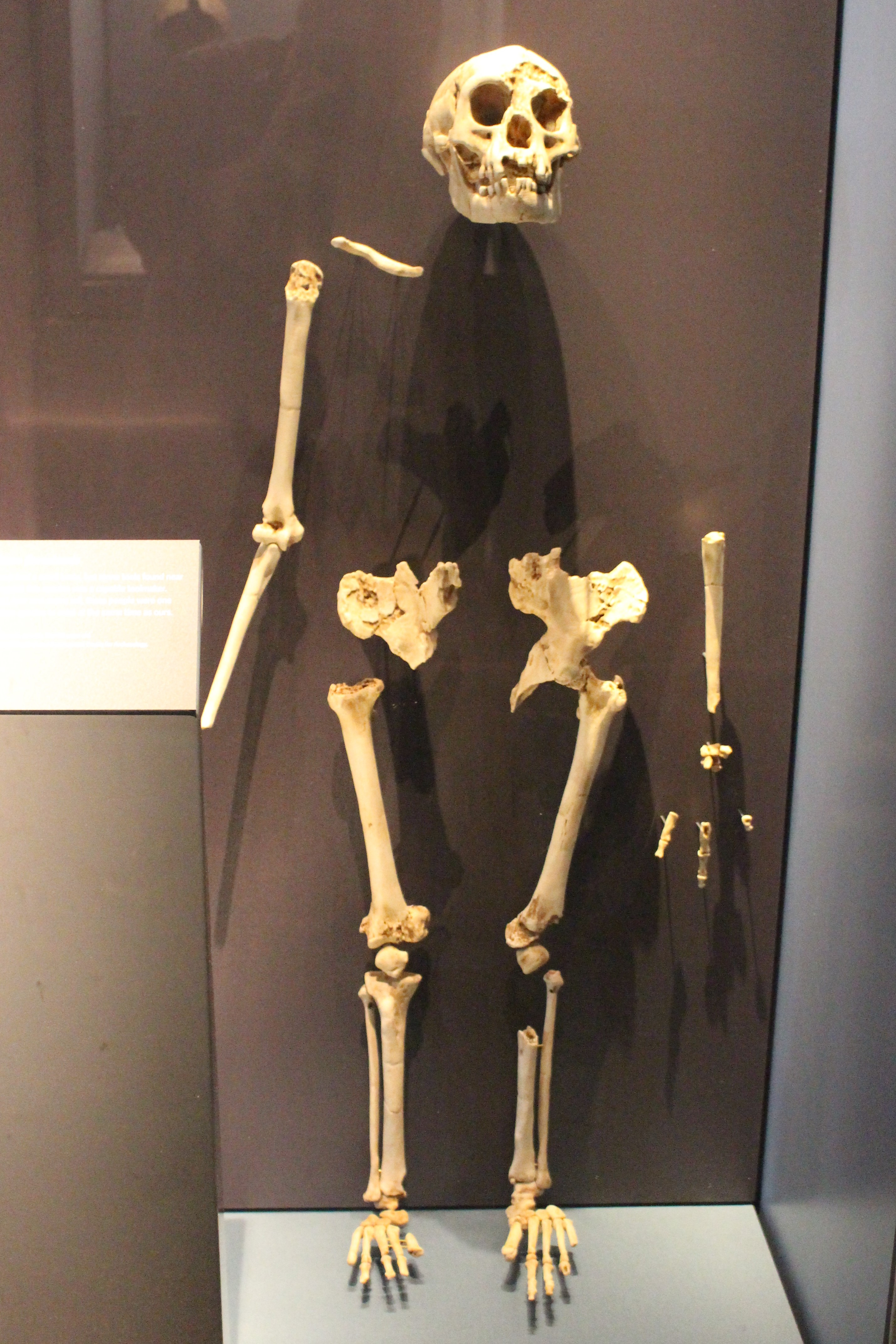
The skeleton of a Homo floresiensis woman at the Natural History Museum in London, England

In September 2003, an Indonesian field team and its coordinator of the excavation team, Thomas Sutikna, uncovered the first indications of a skull. Initially, the archeologists only analyzed the top of the cranium and due to the small size believed that the skull belonged to a small child. However, Sutikna and his colleagues soon discovered that its teeth were permanent and mature, revealing that it actually belonged to a fully grown adult. After a few weeks, the team had discovered most of this particular hominid's skeleton and later was coded LB1, LB2, etc., after the name of the cave. This skeleton later became the holotype specimen of Homo floresiensis, also known as the "hobbit." Despite the small stature and brain size, Homo floresiensis was capable of using stone tools, hunting animals such as small elephants and rodents, and dealing with many predators such as large komodo dragons. As of 2022, excavations are still being conducted and additional findings such as teeth are being discovered and analyzed.

== History of discoveries ==
Theodor L. Verhoeven, a Dutch missionary and archaeologist, was living in Flores in the 1950s and 60s. Verhoeven had been a keen student of archeology at the University of Utrecht. During this time, he worked at a Catholic seminary and in his free time would explore many archeological sites and perform many excavations in Flores. He discovered stone tools and suspected that Homo erectus from Java had made these. However, Verhoeven's work was not acknowledged by many paleoanthropologists at this time. After 30 years, an Indonesian-Dutch excavation team discovered new evidence that suggest that Verhoeven's predictions were correct.

In 2001, an Indonesian-Australian team began excavations in Liang Bua. Their goal was to excavate deeper into the cave hoping to see if modern or pre-modern humans were using Liang Bua. They were led by Indonesian field coordinator, Thomas Sutikna.

In 2003, Benyamin Tarus, a locally hired worker, was excavating a 2 by 2 meter square and found the first indication of a skull at a depth of 6 meters. At that point, many archeologists stepped in to help carefully remove sediment from the top of the skull. Rokus Due Awe, an Indonesian faunal expert, was called in to help inspect the excavated top portion of the skull. By looking at just the top of the skull, Awe believed it belonged to a small child due to the small size of the cranium. However, after several days of excavating, more of the cranium and mandible became exposed. This allowed Awe to further analyze the age and condition of the skull. They discovered that its teeth were permanent, revealing that this skull actually belonged to an adult. The team had discovered most of this particular hominid's skeleton and many stone tools that they may have created and used. They were later coded LB1, LB2, etc., after the name of the cave.

Peter Brown, an expert on cranial, mandibular, and dental anatomy of early and modern humans, was asked to help identify and analyze this new discovery. The skeletal evidence indicates that the adults of these species weighed around 66 to 86 pounds, had an average height of 106 cm (3 ft 6 in) tall, and had very small brains (400 ml). Brown concluded that the proportions between the humerus and femur were very similar to the proportions in Australopithecus and Homo habilis. The characteristics of this skeleton appeared more similar to those of early hominins like Australopithecus afarensis than to those of modern humans. This skeleton later became the holotype specimen of Homo floresiensis.

The key specimens that many researchers focus on are LB1 and LB6. LB1 was discovered unfossilized in September 2003 and consisted of an almost complete skull and partial skeleton. Scientists assume that LB1 was a female of about 30 years old, about one metre tall, had a brain volume of about 380 to 420 ml, and weighed approximately 55 pounds. On the other hand, LB6 consisted of a partial skeleton that appeared shorter than LB1 and its jaw was significantly different as it was more V-shaped. Scientists assume that LB6 was a child and was approximately five years old.

In 2004 Kira Westaway, a paleoanthropologist at the University of Wollongong, analyzed a thick blanket of sediment that the fossils were found in and discovered that these bones ranged from 18,000 to 38,000 years old. This suggests that these species at Liang Bua were alive during modern times and could have possibly shared this island with modern humans for approximately 30,000 years.

== Further research and findings ==
In 2010 and 2011, archaeologists discovered two hominin teeth in the cave that did not come from Homo floresiensis. According to Sutikna, the teeth date to around 46,000 BP and Sutkina and his team speculate that the teeth are likely to have come from Homo sapiens. Sutikna proposed that Homo sapiens could have coexisted with the "hobbits" for thousands of years and he also proposed that Homo sapiens could have led to the extinction of Homo floresiensis. However, there is no evidence to indicate that and as of 2016 research was still being conducted to prove his hypothesis.

In 2013, a 3D model of the cave created via laser scanning was made available online by the Smithsonian Institution.

In 2016, scientists discovered a lower jaw and teeth from at least one adult and potentially two children in Mata Menge, about 70 km east of Liang Bua. These findings are dated to about 700,000 years BP and could possibly be an early form of Homo floresiensis. Additionally in 2016, Sutikna, Smithsonian researcher Matt Tocheri and other researchers announced that they concluded that the skeletal remains at Liang Bua became extinct around 50,000 years ago, much earlier than many researchers had originally thought. In addition, archaeologists discovered stone tools in the cave that were used from 190,000 to 50,000 years BP.

== Chronology ==
Stone tools at the cave span back to around 190,000 years ago, while bone remains span from around 100,000 to 50,000 years ago. Beginning around 46,000 years ago, there is a hiatus in the cave sedimentation, which resumes around 23,000 years ago. In the sediments above the hiatus bone deposition resumes, though Homo floresiensis, Stegodon, the giant stork and the vulture no longer occur, while there is clear evidence of modern human activity. Change in material used in creating stone tools suggests that stone tools made from 46,000 years ago onwards were produced by modern humans, and not H. floresiensis. These stone tools provide the earliest evidence for modern human arrival on Flores.

== Palaeofauna ==
After

- Homo floresiensis
- Stegodon florensis insularis, extinct dwarfed stegodontid proboscidean
- Papagomys theodorverhoeveni, extinct giant rat
- Papagomys armandvillei, giant rat
- Spelaeomys florensis, extinct giant rat
- Lawomys rokusi large probably extinct shrew-rat
- Hooijeromys nusatenggara medium-sized rat
- Komodomys rintjanus small rat
- Rattus exulans (Polynesian rat)
- Rattus hainaldi small rat
- Varanus komodoensis, (Komodo dragon)
- Varanus hooijeri extinct frugivorous monitor lizard
- Leptoptilos robustus, extinct giant stork
- Trigonoceps sp., extinct vulture
