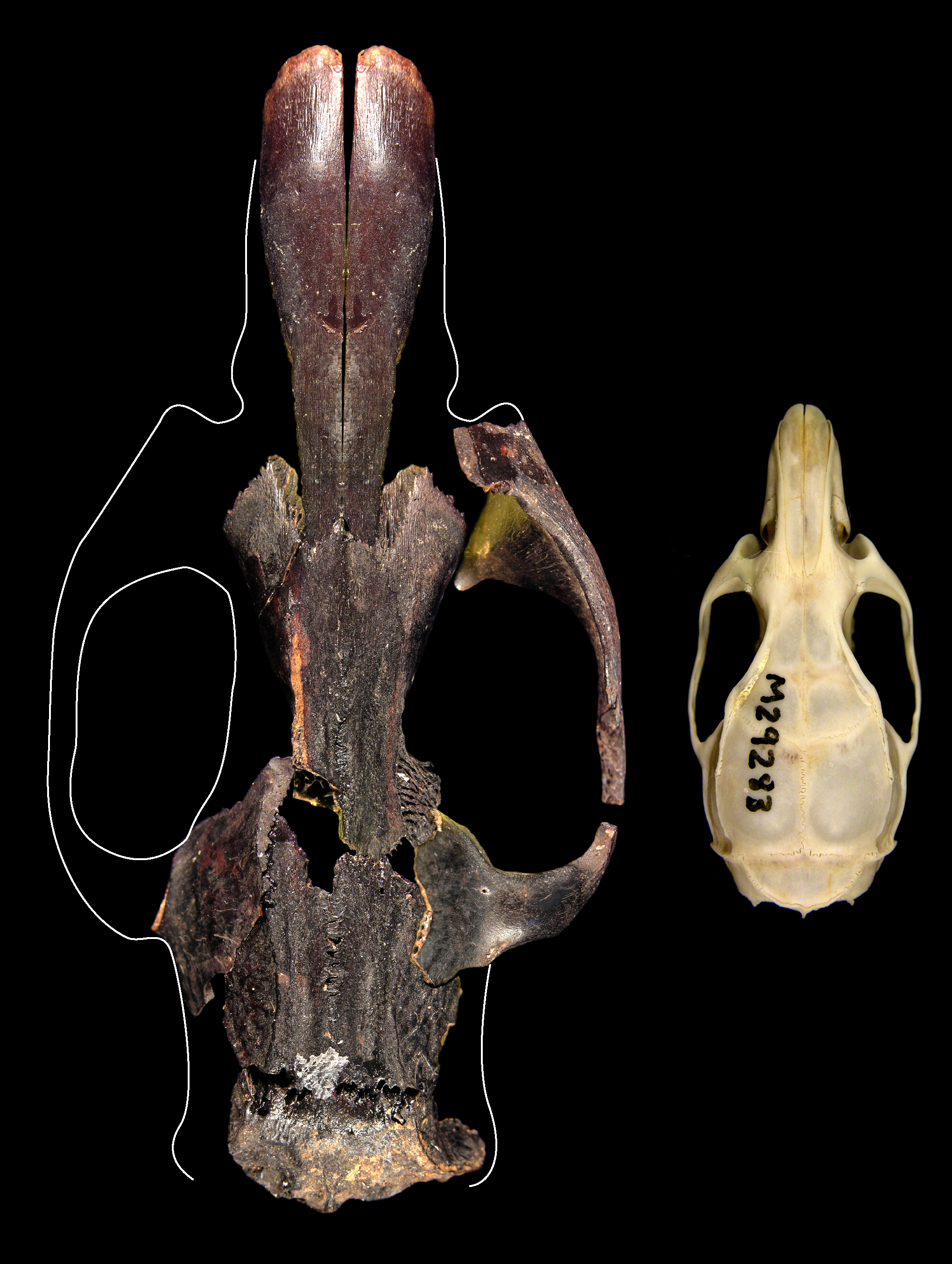
- The skull of a black rat (right) compared with a fairly complete skull of a specimen of the extinct Coryphomys musseri (left).

Scientific classification
- Kingdom: Animalia
- Phylum: Chordata
- Class: Mammalia
- Infraclass: Placentalia
- Order: Rodentia
- Family: Muridae
- Subfamily: Murinae
- Genus: †Coryphomys; Schaub, 1937

Species
- Coryphomys buehleri Schaub, 1937; Coryphomys musseri Aplin & Helgen, 2010

= Coryphomys =

Coryphomys Temporal range: Holocene

Extinct genus of rodents

Coryphomys is an extinct genus of rats, known from sub-fossils found on Timor. Its name is Greek for "top-of-the-head mouse" or "summit mouse".

Species include Coryphomys buehleri and Coryphomys musseri. Archaeological research on East Timor has revealed the bones of rats weighing up to 6 kilograms (13.2 pounds) when adult. They seem to have died out between 1000 and 2000 years ago, perhaps due to large-scale forest clearance for farming.

In 2015, the discovery of fossils of "seven new species of giant rat", including the "largest rat ever" on the island of East Timor was announced. The biggest of these rats was described as weighing "five kilos (11 pounds), the size of a small dog," and was referred to as the "Giant Rat" in news stories.
