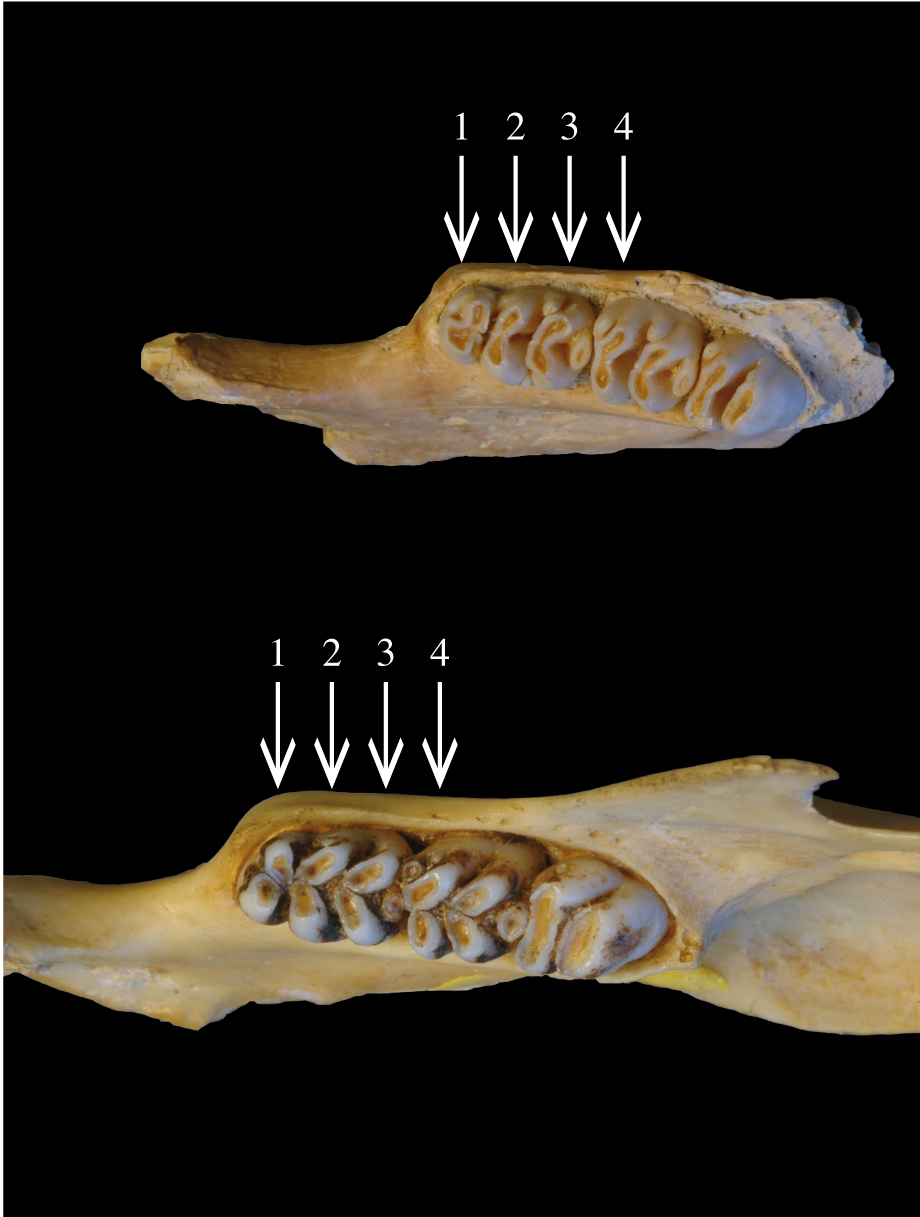
- Holotypes of Papagomys theodorverhoeveni (above) and Papagomys armandvillei (below), with four diagnostic characters marked

Conservation status
- Extinct

Scientific classification
- Kingdom: Animalia
- Phylum: Chordata
- Class: Mammalia
- Order: Rodentia
- Family: Muridae
- Genus: Papagomys
- Species: †P. theodorverhoeveni

Binomial name
- †Papagomys theodorverhoeveni Musser, 1981

= Verhoeven's giant rat =

Verhoeven's giant tree rat Temporal range: Holocene

Species of rodent

Verhoeven's giant rat (Papagomys theodorverhoeveni) is an extinct rat of subfamily Murinae that lived on Flores in Indonesia. It was judged to be extinct in 1996. However, experts believe that it died out before 1500 AD. The species is known only from several subfossil fragments. It was named after Dutch priest Theodor Verhoeven. A 1974 report of a recent specimen has been judged to represent P. armandvillei instead. It was somewhat smaller than P. armandivillei, with an estimated body mass of around 0.6–1.6 kilograms (1.3–3.5 lb). It is assumed to have been terrestrial, and to have been an omnivore, consuming fruit and invertebrates.
