= Mountain giant Sunda rat =

Conservation status
- Least Concern (IUCN 3.1)

Scientific classification
- Kingdom: Animalia
- Phylum: Chordata
- Class: Mammalia
- Order: Rodentia
- Family: Muridae
- Genus: Sundamys
- Species: S. infraluteus

Binomial name
- Sundamys infraluteus (Thomas, 1888)
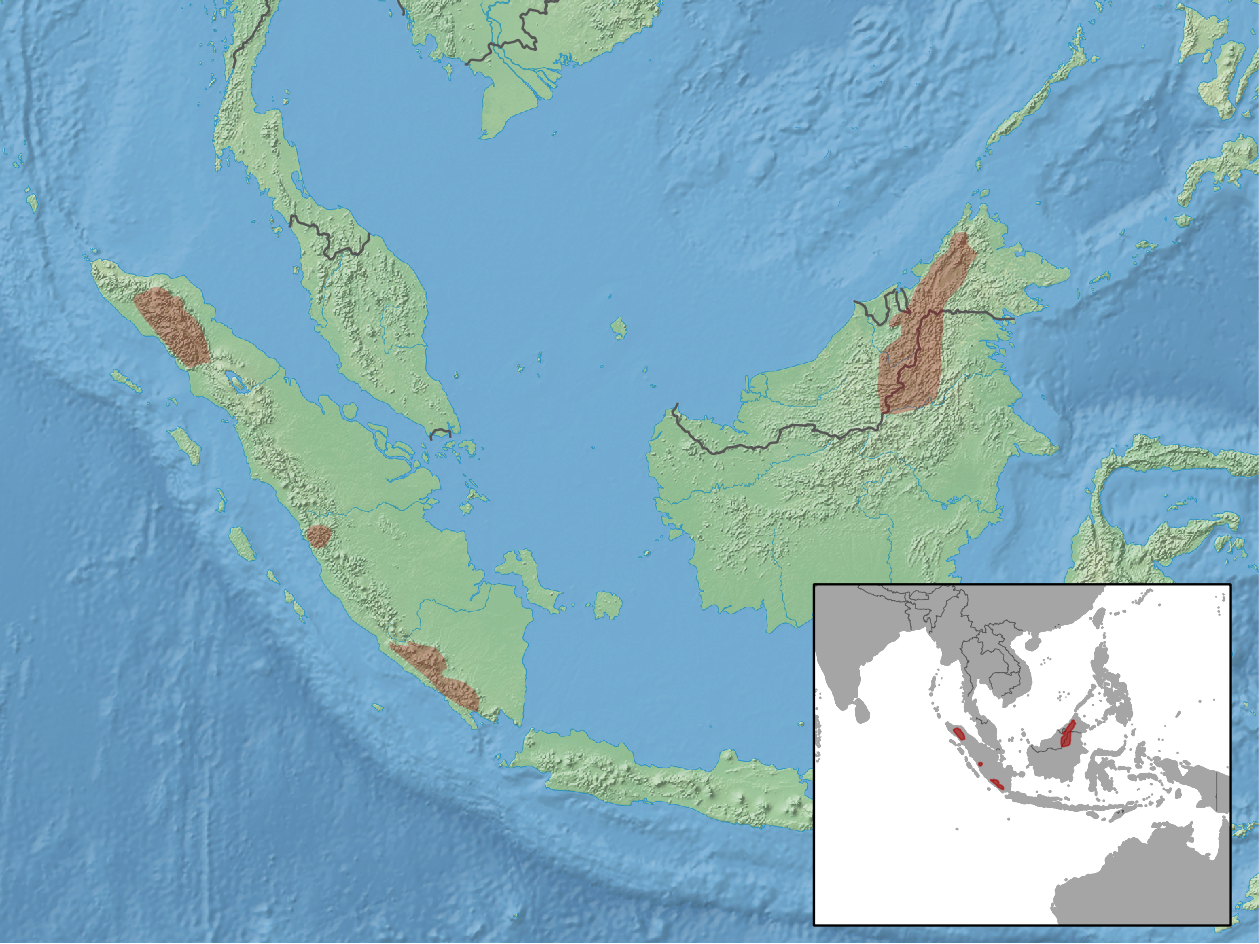

Species of rodent

The mountain giant Sunda rat, Sundamys infraluteus (also known as the giant mountain rat or giant rat of Sumatra) is a large rat, around 480 to 640 millimeters (19 to 25 inches) in total length (230 to 290 millimeters [9-11.5 inches] excluding the tail). It weighs 230 to 600 grams. This makes it somewhat larger than a Norway rat, which averages around 300 grams, with 500 grams being unusually large. The rat is mostly dark brown with paler brownish specks. Its long fur is covered with even longer guard hairs. The tail is uniformly brown.

== Habitat and habits ==
This species lives in forested mountains, between 700 and 2400 meters. It is found in southeastern Asia, especially Indonesia and Malaysia. The species is omnivorous.

== Other information ==
Arthur Conan Doyle refers to a 'giant rat of Sumatra' in "The Adventure of the Sussex Vampire". Some scholars, including Leslie S. Klinger, have identified that rat as Sundamys infraluteus.
