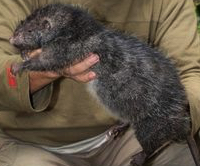
- Mallomys gunung

Scientific classification
- Kingdom: Animalia
- Phylum: Chordata
- Class: Mammalia
- Order: Rodentia
- Family: Muridae
- Tribe: Hydromyini
- Genus: Mallomys; Thomas, 1898

Type species
- Mallomys rothschildi

Species
- Mallomys aroaensis Mallomys gunung Mallomys istapantap Mallomys rothschildi

= Mallomys =

Mallomys Temporal range: Pleistocene to Recent

Genus of rodents

Mallomys is a genus of rodent in the family Muridae. The name of the genus is formed from the Greek μαλλός, mallos, wool, and μῦς, mus, mouse/rat. These very large rats weigh between 0.95 and 2 kilograms (2.1 and 4.4 lb) and are native to highlands in New Guinea. Little is known about their behavior, but they are believed to feed on leaves, grasses and other plant material.

It contains the following species:

- De Vis's woolly rat (Mallomys aroaensis)
- Alpine woolly rat (Mallomys gunung)
- Subalpine woolly rat (Mallomys istapantap)
- Rothschild's woolly rat (Mallomys rothschildi)

Apparently undescribed species of Mallomys have been reported from the Foja Mountains in Northern West Papua, as well as within the crater of Mount Bosavi in the Southern Highlands of Papua New Guinea.
