= Raden Panji Soejono =

Indonesian archaeologist (1926–2011)

Professor Raden Panji Soejono (1926 – 16 May 2011) was an Indonesian archaeologist. He retired as director of the National Research Centre for Archaeology (ARKENAS) in 1987. Early in his career, in 1956, he served as Curator of Prehistory at the National Museum of Indonesia. He received the title of Extraordinarius Professor at the University of Indonesia and the Gadjah Mada University, and Doctor Onoris Causa at Aix-Marseille University. In 1990, he was awarded the Chevalier de l'Ordre des Arts et Lettres.
