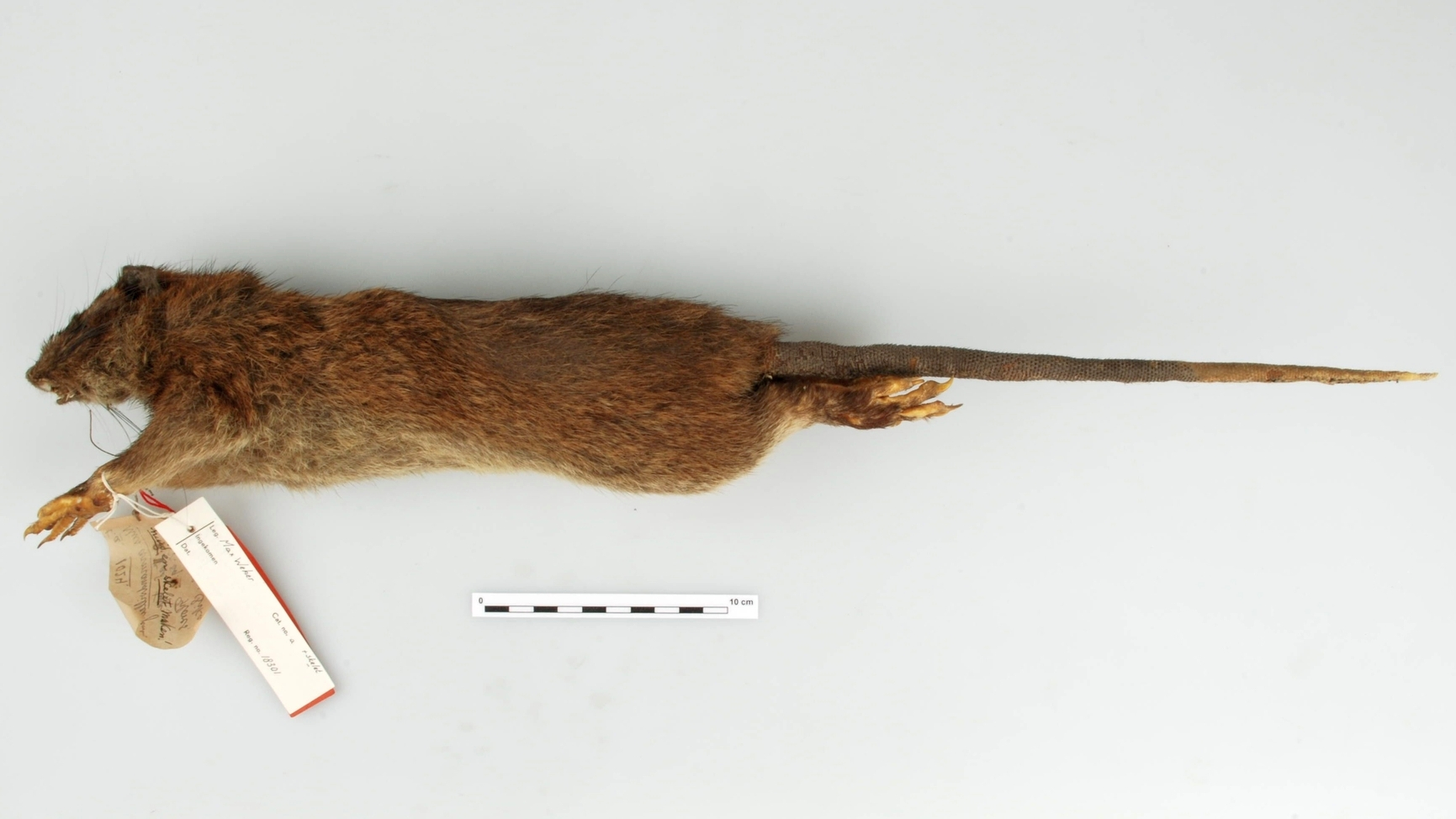
- Stuffed specimen

Conservation status
- Near Threatened (IUCN 3.1)

Scientific classification
- Kingdom: Animalia
- Phylum: Chordata
- Class: Mammalia
- Order: Rodentia
- Family: Muridae
- Genus: Papagomys
- Species: P. armandvillei

Binomial name
- Papagomys armandvillei (Jentink, 1892)

= Flores giant rat =

Species of rodent

The Flores giant rat (Papagomys armandvillei) is a rodent of the family Muridae that occurs on the island of Flores in Indonesia. It has been recorded in Rutong Protection Forest. The species is found in primary, secondary and disturbed forest over a wide range of elevations. Its head and body length is 41–45 cm (16–17.5 in) and its tail length is 33–70 cm (13–27.5 in). These dimensions are about twice as large as those of a typical brown rat (Rattus norvegicus), which suggests about eight times the body mass.

The body mass has been estimated at 1.2–2.5 kilograms (2.6–5.5 lb), comparable to a rabbit.

Papagomys armandvillei is the only extant species in the genus Papagomys, with another smaller species, Papagomys theodorverhoeveni, known from subfossil remains. The specific epithet, armandvillei, honours the Dutch Jesuit missionary Cornelis Johann Le Cocq d'Armandville (1846–1896), who was stationed in the Dutch East Indies, beginning in Java, East Nusa Tenggara, and later in New Guinea.

Guy Musser describes the Flores giant rat as having small, round ears, a chunky body, and a small tail, and as appearing to be adapted for life on the ground with refuge in burrows. It has dense dark hair (pelage). Analysis of the teeth suggests a diet of leaves, buds, fruit, and certain kinds of insects as inferred by large hypsodont teeth.

The Flores giant rat has been suggested to have been a prey item of the extinct dwarf human species Homo floresiensis.

== Conservation ==
P. armandvillei is listed as Near Threatened by the IUCN Red List. Threats include subsistence hunting and predation by dogs and cats.

== See also ==
- Island gigantism
