= Behali Wildlife Sanctuary =

Reserved Forest of Assam

- IUCN category IV (habitat/species management area)
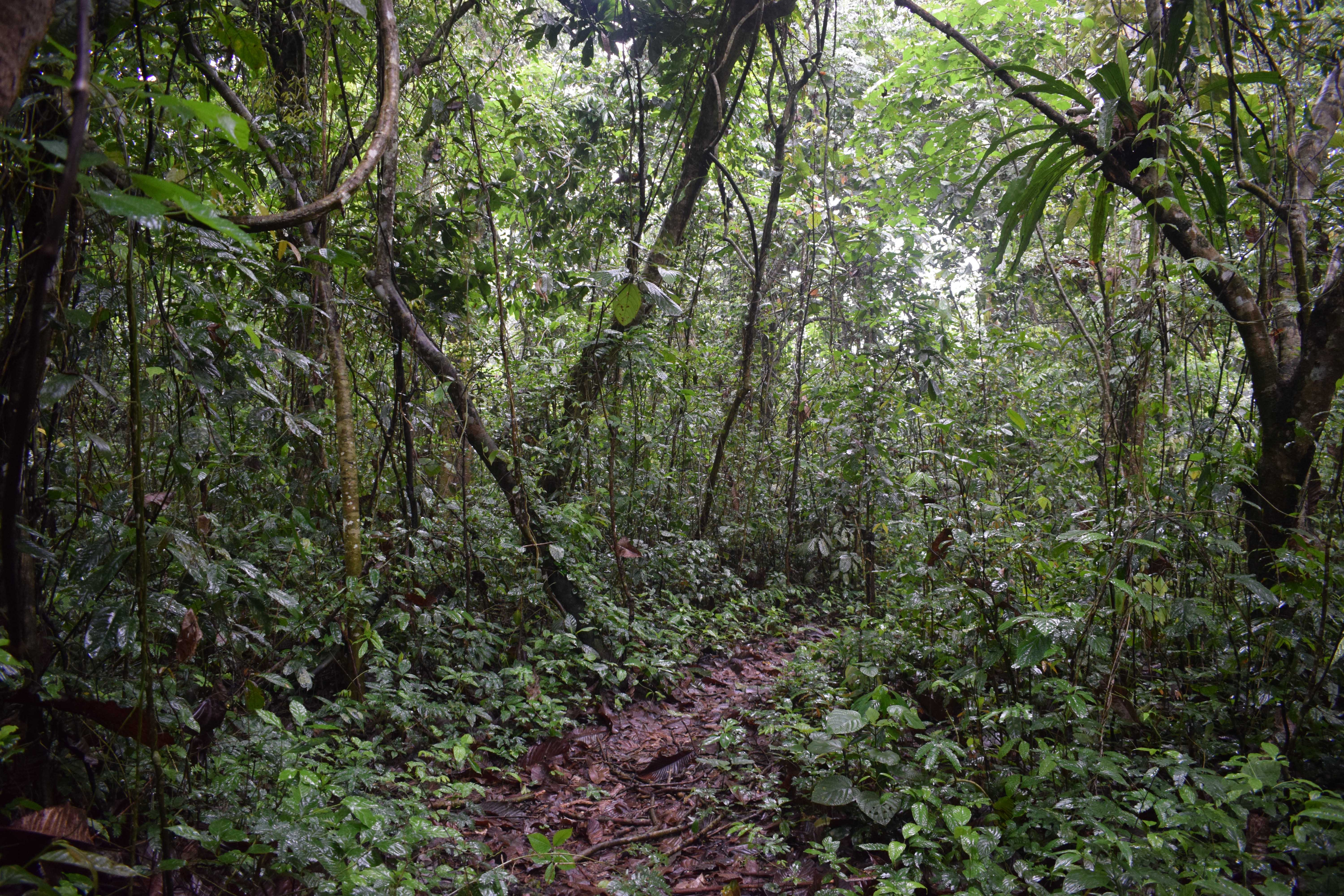
- Behali Reserved Forest

- Location within Assam Location within India
- Location: Biswanath Assam India
- Nearest city: Biswanath, India
- Coordinates: 26°54′32″N 93°18′29″E
- Area: 140 km^{2} (54.1 sq mi)
- Established: 1917; 109 years ago
- Governing body: Ministry of Environment and Forests, Government of India
- Website: Behali-Reserve-Forest

Behali Wildlife Sanctuary, located in the Biswanath district of Assam is a patch of semi-evergreen forest in the foothills of Eastern Himalayas.

This forest is a part of the greater Sonitpur Elephant Reserve and was declared as a reserved forest in 1917. It lies between the two famous protected areas, the Nameri National Park on its west and Kaziranga National Park on its south comprising a total area of 140 km^{2}. Hence it acts as an important corridor for migration of several species between these protected areas mainly the elephants.

On 4 May 2022, in The Assam Gazette, the Governor of Assam proposed to declare the Behali Reserved Forest as a Wildlife Sanctuary.

It is also recognized as an Important Bird Area in 1994 and a Key Biodiversity Area in 2004.

Located between 93°11′30.58″ E and 93°23′21.09″ E longitudes and 26°52′20.08″ N and 26°57′33.17″N latitudes, the area is bordered in the east by the Buroi River, west by Borgang river, the north side is by Papum Reserve of Arunachal Pradesh and several human habitations, tea plantations and paddy fields in the south. With an elevation between 90 metres to 110 metres a.s.l., the forest comprises several highlands and lowlands. The temperature varies between 13 °C to 37 °C and the mean annual rainfall in the forest is about 1800 mm.

== Landscape and Biodiversity ==
=== Rivers ===
Borgang and Buroi are the main tributaries flowing through Behali Reserve Forest and drains in the Brahmaputra. Apart from these, there are several other small streams spanning the forest such as Behali, Bedeti, Bihmari, Borajuli, Dikal, Diring, Kochujan, Kolaguri, Naharjan, Nasbor, Sauldhowa, Sukansuti, etc.

=== Flora ===
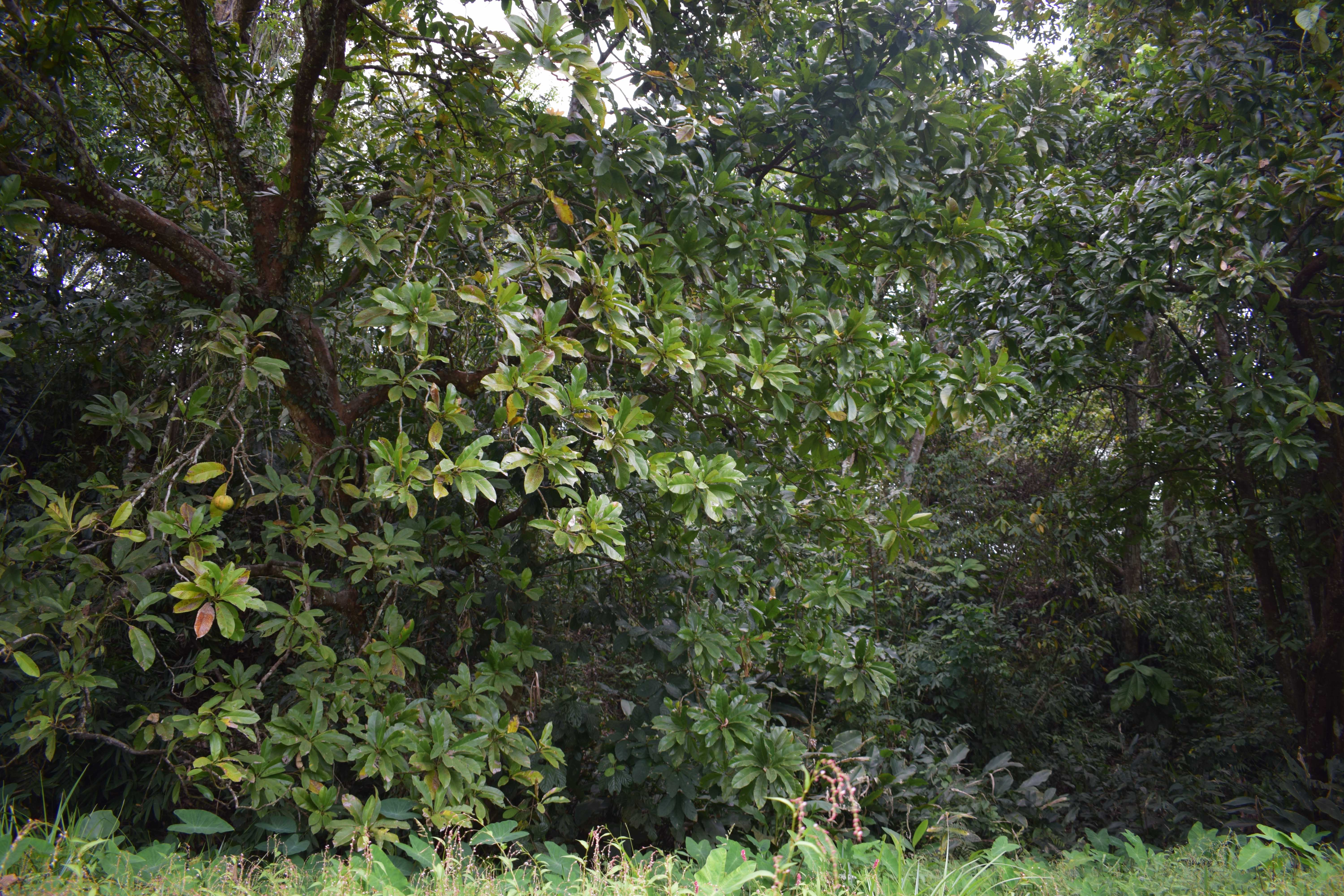
Semi-evergreen patches of Behali Reserved Forest

The flora of the forest hosts a total of 308 native angiosperm species. Botanist Dipankar Borah discovered three new taxa, including Chlorophytum assamicum and Peliosanthes macrophylla var assamensis which are endemic to this forest and Aristolochia assamica which is now endemic to Northeast India after being collected from a few more locations in NE India. Tupistra stoliczkana was rediscovered after more than a century, Galeola nudifolia and Pandanus unguifer were added to the flora of Assam and Citrus indica was recollected after several years from Assam.

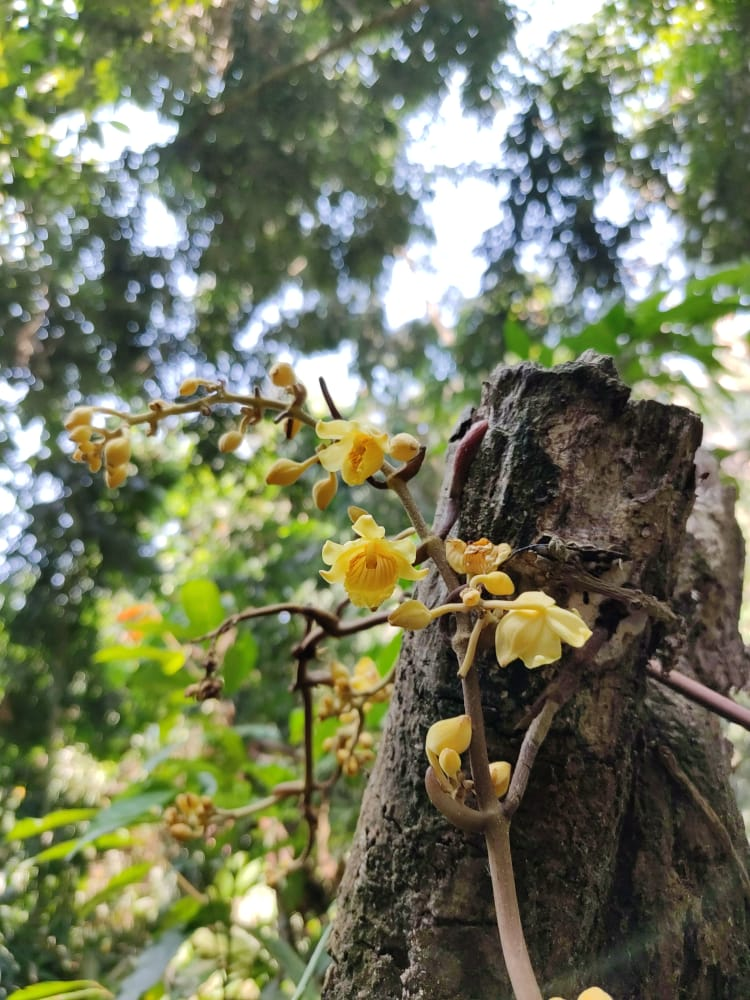
Galeola nudifolia, newly recorded orchid for the flora of Assam

Magnolia hogdsonii, Elaeocarpus rugosus, E. varunua, Bauhinia variegata, and Gynocardia odorata are some of the common woody species in the forest. The forest patch also hosts different habitat types such as pristine forests, secondary forests, rehabilitated forests, riparian forests, open habitats (e.g. grasslands), and wetlands. Further, the reserve forest is home to 37 orchid species distributed throughout the canopies and also the ground. Ficus with 14 species is one of the keystone plant group on which several avifauna depend upon.

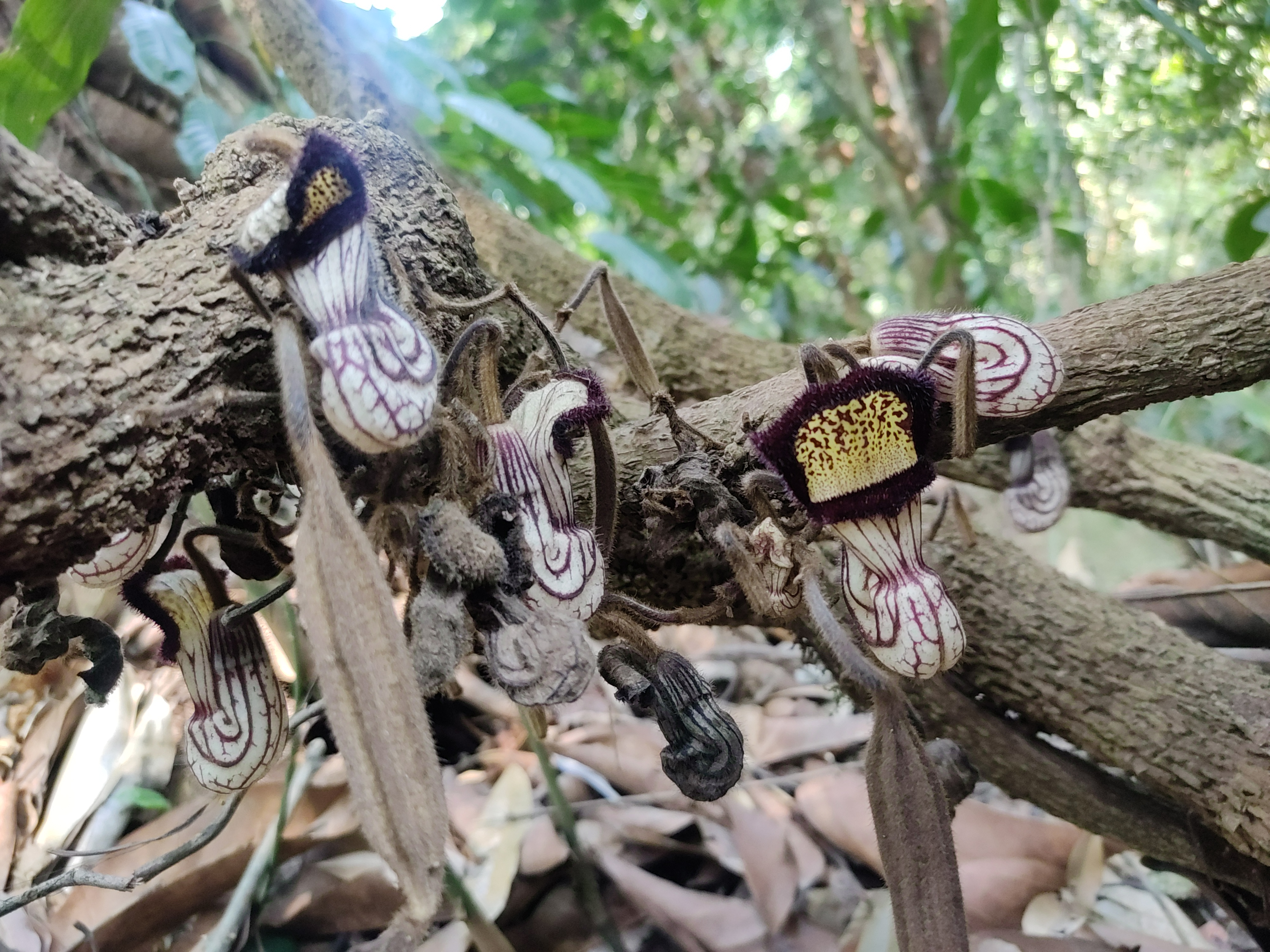
Aristolochia cathcartii a rare liana in Behali Reserved Forest

=== Fauna ===
The forest is also rich in its fauna with 282 birds, 275 butterflies, 49 mammals, 23 snakes, 12 amphibians, 11 turtles and 11 lizards documented so far. This last left forest patch is inhabited by some of the most threatened and endemic faunal species including Rufous-necked hornbill (Aceros nipalensis), Wreathed hornbill (Aceros undulatus), Binturong (Arctictis binturong), White-winged duck (Asarcornis scutulata), Indian Bison (Bos gaurus), Great hornbill (Buceros bicornis), Woolly-necked stork (Ciconia episcopus), Dhole (Cuon alpinus), Southeast Asian box turtle (Cuora amboinensis), Keeled box turtle (Cuora mouhotii), Asian Elephant (Elephas maximus), Black pond turtle (Geoclemys hamiltonii), Indian hog deer (Hyelaphus porcinus), Lesser adjutant (Leptoptilos javanicus), Smooth-coated otter (Lutrogale perspicillata), Tricarinate hill turtle (Melanochelys tricarinata), Clouded leopard (Neofelis nebulosa), Indian softshell turtle (Nilssonia gangeticus), Indian peacock softshell turtle (Nilssonia hurum), Bengal slow loris (Nycticebus bengalensis), King cobra (Ophiophagus hannah), Leopard (Panthera pardus), Pygmy hog (Porcula salvania), Burmese python (Python bivittatus), Sambar deer (Rusa unicolor), River tern (Sterna aurantia), Capped langur (Trachypithecus pileatus), Asian black bear (Ursus thibetanus), Chinese pangolin (Manis pentadactyla), Red-headed vulture (Sarcogyps calvus) and Black softshell turtle (Nilssonia nigricans).

== Importance ==
=== Archaeological importance ===
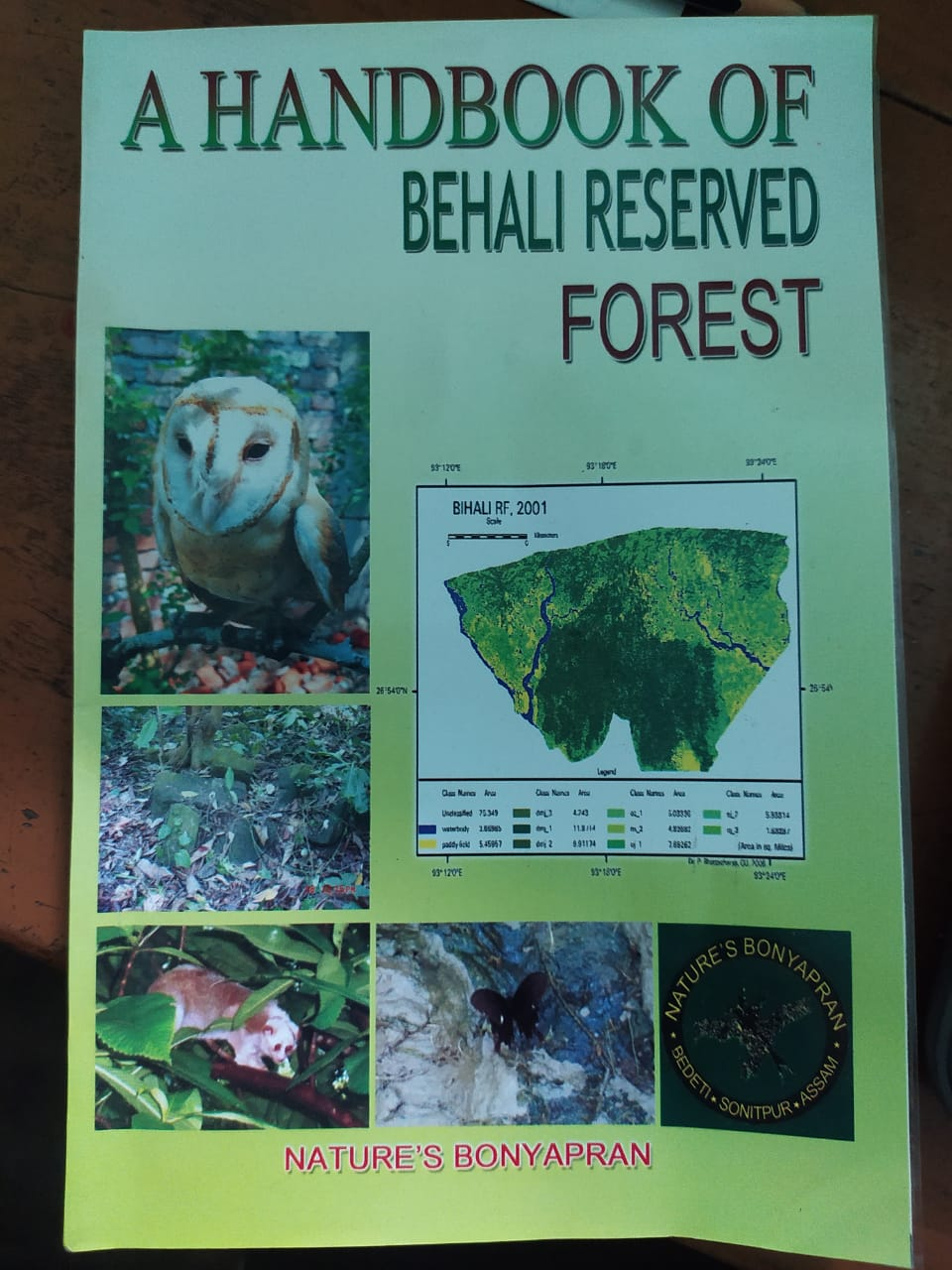
Cover page of "Handbook of Behali Reserved Forest" by Nature's Bonyapran

Behali RF is a storehouse of many archaeological ruins. An ancient town of 14th century built by Boro-barahi kings remains hidden amongst the dense vegetation. Sculptured palaces, tanks, stone boundary walls, etc. can be seen dispersed till now. A rampart named Rajgarh is one of the many garh (forts) which runs through the Behali RF, built by the Ahom king Swargadeo Pratap Singha. And hidden for centuries, the Maidam Pukhuri, a tank built by the same king between the early 9th to 14th centuries still remains in the core part of Behali RF with the stone bound borders covering an area of 0.26 hectares.

=== The people and non-timber forest products ===
Several indigenous communities also resides in the boundaries of Behali RF and whom the Karbi and the Munda are the prominent settlers. Around 100 non-timber forest products have been reported to be used by these communities from Behali RF. The dependence on this forest is intricately associated with their culture, which might be a cause for the forests survival so far.

=== Ecological Importance ===
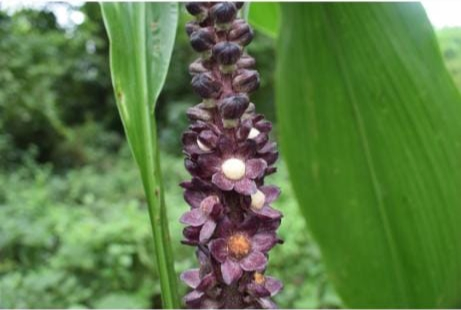
Rediscovery of Tupistra stoliczkana (Asparagaceae) in northeastern India.

This forest is now the last left forest of Biswanath district of Assam. Apart from hosting such a large sum of biodiversity it also balances the ecological sanctity of the area. It is the major oxygen producer for the zone and it stores tons of carbon emitted by the tea and brick industries predominant in the district. Maintaining the ground water level, providing essential commodities to several dependent population are many of the other examples known.

== Conflicts and threats ==
The area is under severe conflict with its neighbouring region regarding its northern boundary. Illegal encroachment from almost all the sides, more severe in the northern boundary is one of the most major concern for survival of this forest along with deforestation and hunting. Now only 60 km^{2} of the original forest cover is left, others being encroached or are degraded.
