= Leptoptilos patagonicus =

Leptoptilos patagonicus Temporal range: Late Miocene (Chasicoan) ~9.41 Ma

Scientific classification
- Kingdom: Animalia
- Phylum: Chordata
- Class: Aves
- Order: Ciconiiformes
- Family: Ciconiidae
- Genus: Leptoptilos
- Species: †L. patagonicus

Binomial name
- †Leptoptilos patagonicus Noriega & Cladera, 2008

Extinct species of bird

Leptoptilos patagonicus is an extinct species of large-bodied stork that existed during the Late Miocene. Fossils of the species were discovered in the San Madryn Formation in Chubut Province, Argentina. L. patagonicus is the first fossil record discovery of a member of Leptoptilos in South America and the only one found so far in the New World.

== Description ==
In comparison with extant Leptoptilos, L. patagonicus is larger than L. javanicus and similar in size to the largest members of L. dubius and L. crumenifer. In comparison with extant Leptoptilos, the hindlimbs are larger than the forelimbs, resulting in shorter wings relative to extant Leptoptilos, a characteristic shared by the extinct Leptoptilos falconeri. L. patagonicus is smaller than L. falconeri.

The humerus and ulna are shorter than those of L. dubius and L. crumenifer. The tibiotarsus is shorter than that of L. falconeri, but slighter longer than those usually found in L. dubius and L. crumenifer.
