= Leptoptilos lui =

Leptoptilos lui Temporal range: Middle Pleistocene, .260 Ma

Scientific classification
- Kingdom: Animalia
- Phylum: Chordata
- Class: Aves
- Order: Ciconiiformes
- Family: Ciconiidae
- Genus: Leptoptilos
- Species: †L. lui

Binomial name
- †Leptoptilos lui Zhang et al., 2012

Synonyms
- Leptoptilos lüi Zhang et al., 2012 incorrect original spelling

Extinct species of bird

Leptoptilos lui is an extinct species of large-bodied stork that existed during the Middle Pleistocene. Along with Aegypius jinniushanensis, L. lui is one of several new species of extinct birds discovered at Jinniushan, Liaoning, China. The extinct stork is named after Professor Zun-e Lu.

When described, the name was spelled as Leptoptilos lüi, however, this violates the rules of the International Code of Zoological Nomenclature, so the correct spelling is Leptoptilos lui.

Extant members of the genus Leptoptilos are today found only found in the African and Asian tropics. L. lui is the only member of Leptoptilos from the Pleistocene so far to have been discovered outside of its modern range.

== Description ==
L. lui is one of the largest Leptoptilos on record and might be larger than Leptoptilos titan and Leptoptilos robustus. (Note: Insufficient overlapping elements for a full comparison) The humerus and proximal phalanx are longer and more robust than those of any other Leptoptilos on record.

With very long wings, L. lui was probably a good flyer that mainly relied on gliding and soaring on the thermal air currents available then, as the climate conditions in the region during the Middle Pleistocene was a lot warmer and more humid. L. lui most likely relied on scavenging from Pleistocene megafauna for the bulk of its food source. The disappearance of Pleistocene megafauna and climate change are likely the primary causes of its extinction.

== Bibliography ==
- Zhang, Zihui; Huang, Yunping; James, Helen F.; Hou, Lianhai (2012). "A Marabou (Ciconiidae: Leptoptilos) from the Middle Pleistocene of Northeastern China". The Auk. 129 (4): 699–706. doi:10.1525/auk.2012.11227. S2CID 55170353.
