= Leptoptilos titan =

Leptoptilos titan Temporal range: Pleistocene

Scientific classification
- Kingdom: Animalia
- Phylum: Chordata
- Class: Aves
- Order: Ciconiiformes
- Family: Ciconiidae
- Genus: Leptoptilos
- Species: †L. titan

Binomial name
- †Leptoptilos titan Wetmore, 1940

Extinct species of stork

Leptoptilos titan is a species of adjutant-like stork that lived in Watualang, East Java during the Middle-Upper Pleistocene epoch. It remains mainly consist of a nearly complete left metatarsus that measure around 372 mm in length. Compared to largest marabou stork metatarsus specimen (345 mm), it can be inferred that L. titan was a very tall stork. Only L. falconeri from Africa and South Asia that have longer metatarsi (405 mm). Meanwhile, the more famous L. robustus have shorter metatarsi based on the more recently found specimen (LB-Av-2476) that is 10 mm shorter but have larger shaft dimension than those of L. titan.

The discovery of this species and L. robustus show that Southeast Asia is probably the last refugee for giant adjutant-like stork in Pleistocene epoch. Its also noteworthy to mention that L. titan lived alongside an unidentified Aegypiinae vulture which consist of distal portions of a right ulna and radius about the size of white-rumped vulture. This faunal composition can also be seen in L. robustus environment on Flores island that housed vulture species (Trigonoceps).
