= Dipankar Borah =

Indian Field Botanist (born 1994)

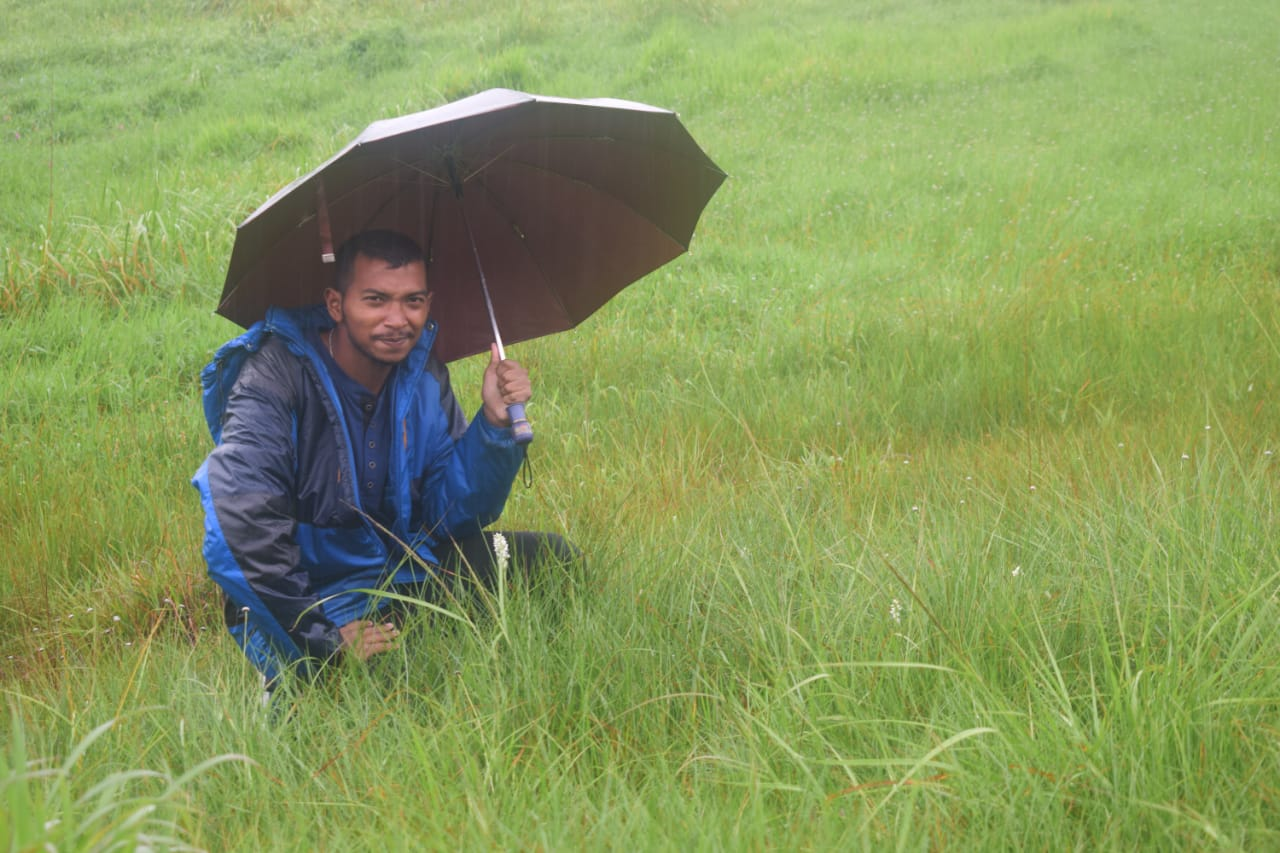
- Dipankar Borah with Peristylus densus in the grasslands of Meghalaya
- Born: 11 October 1994 (age 31)
- Occupations: Assistant professor; Researcher

Academic background
- Education: Rajiv Gandhi University; Biswanath College

Academic work
- Main interests: Plant taxonomy; Ethnobotany
- Website: Ethnobotany of Northeast India

Dipankar Borah (born 1994) is an Indian field botanist from Assam.

== Personal life ==
Dipankar Borah is a botanist of the region and belongs from Monabarie TE, one of the largest tea plantations in the country located in the Biswanath District of Assam. Son of Moheswar Borah (father) and Bijanti Borah (mother). He did his BSc from Biswanath College (affiliated to Gauhati University) in 2015, his MSc in 2017 and PhD in 2022 from Rajiv Gandhi University. He conducted majority of his plant explorations in Arunachal Pradesh, Assam and Meghalaya states of Northeast India. From 2020 to 2023, he served as an Assistant Professor in the Department of Botany, Goalpara College, Assam, India. Since July 2023, he has been serving as an Assistant Professor in the Department of Botany at Kaliabor College, Assam.

== Work ==
Borah is best known for his studies on Begonias, Gesneriads, Aristolochia (Pipeworts) and Chlorophytum of Northeastern India (in the Himalayas and Indo-Burma biodiversity hotspots) apart from several other genera. So far he has described more than 20 new plant names.

In February 2021, Borah along with his two fellow scientists discovered a new alpine plant species named Cremanthodium indicum from Penga Teng Tso of Arunachal Pradesh's Tawang district, which became too popular amongst the plants described that year.

He was also into the discovery of Pedicularis khoiyangii, a plant species that was discovered in alpine regions of the Eastern Himalayas and named after his late friend, Mr. Hawtoo Khoiyang. Its common name is Hawtoo’s lousewort.

In December 2020, three Indian scientists, V.S. Hareesh, M. Sabu and Dipankar Borah, discovered a new species named Amomum arunachalense from Nirjuli in Papum Pare district, Arunachal Pradesh.

He has also been into conservation of orchids of Assam.

Borah has worked extensively in Behali Reserved Forest and raised his voice for its protection and upgradation.

== Doctoral research ==
He did his PhD on floristic studies of Behali Wildlife Sanctuary (formerly known as Behali Reserve Forest) from Rajiv Gandhi University, Arunachal Pradesh. Borah is also the creator of the public website "Ethnobotany of Northeast India", database of names of useful plants of Northeast India.
