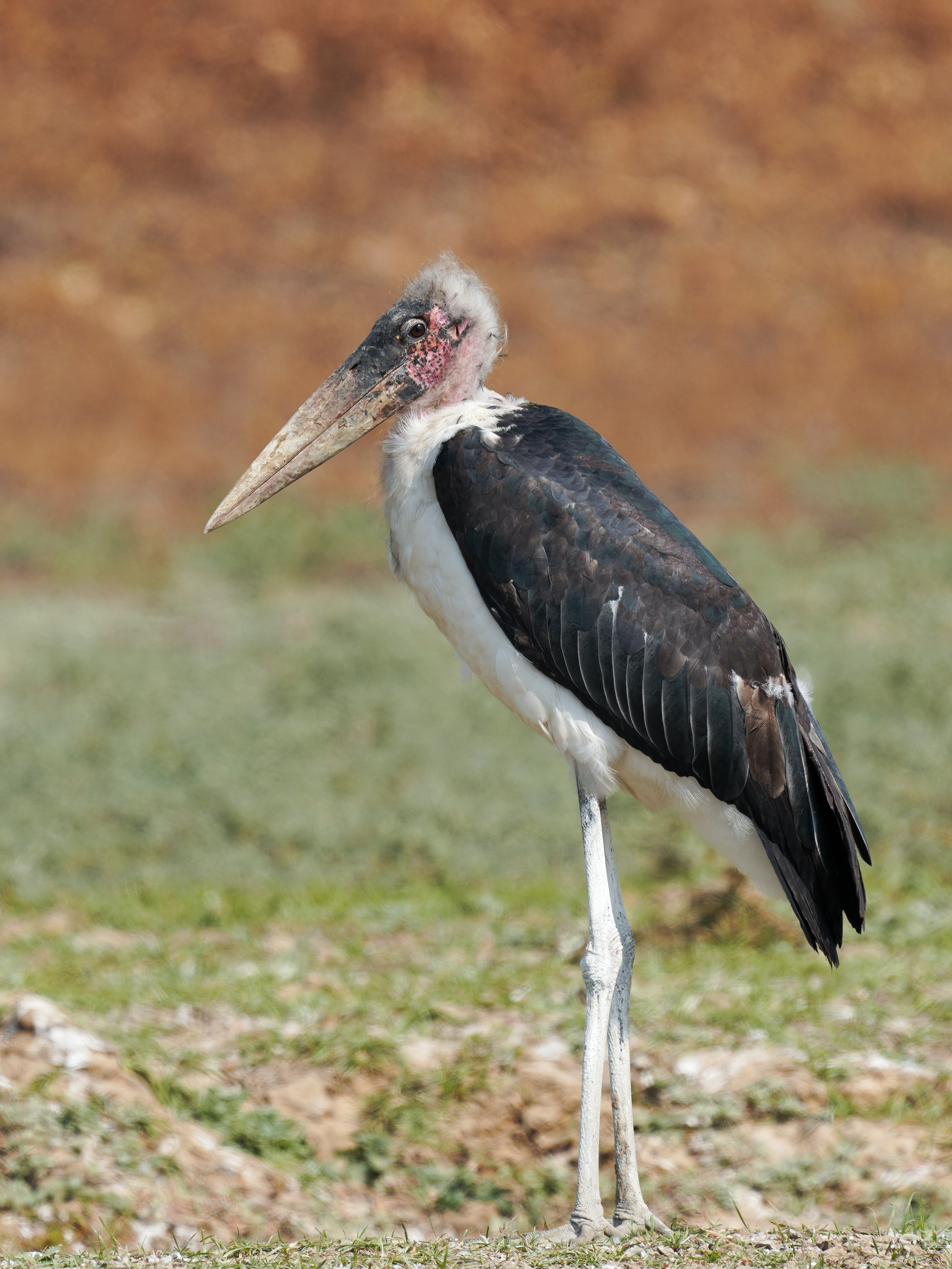
- Marabou stork near South Luangwa National Park, Zambia

Scientific classification
- Kingdom: Animalia
- Phylum: Chordata
- Class: Aves
- Order: Ciconiiformes
- Family: Ciconiidae
- Genus: Leptoptilos; Lesson, RP, 1831

Type species
- Ardea argala = Ardea dubia Latham, 1790

Species
- L. crumenifer L. dubius L. javanicus

Synonyms
- Cryptociconia

= Leptoptilos =

Leptoptilos Temporal range: Late Miocene to Recent

Genus of birds

Leptoptilos is a genus of very large tropical storks, commonly known as adjutants. The name means thin (lepto from Ancient Greek λεπτός) feather (ptilos from Ancient Greek πτίλον). Two species are resident breeders in southern Asia, and the marabou stork is found in Sub-Saharan Africa.

These are huge birds, typically 110–150 cm (3 ft 7 in – 4 ft 11 in) tall with a 210–250 cm (6 ft 11 in – 8 ft 2 in) wingspan. The three species each have a black upper body and wings, and white belly and undertail. The head and neck are bare like those of a vulture. The huge bill is long and thick. Juveniles are a duller, browner version of the adult.

Leptoptilos storks are gregarious colonial breeders in wetlands, building large stick nests in trees. They feed on frogs, insects, young birds, lizards and rodents. They are frequent scavengers, and the naked head and neck are adaptations to this, as are those of the vultures with which they often feed. A feathered head would become rapidly clotted with blood and other substances when a scavenging bird's head was inside a large corpse, and the bare head is easier to keep clean.

Most storks fly with neck outstretched, but the three Leptoptilos storks retract their necks in flight like a heron.

== Taxonomy and species ==
The genus Leptoptilos was introduced in 1831 by the French naturalist René Lesson. The genus name combines the Ancient Greek leptos meaning "delicate" or "slender" with ptilon meaning "feather". The type species was subsequently designated as the greater adjutant by George Robert Gray.

The genus contains three extant species.

Genus Leptoptilos – Lesson, RP, 1831 – three species
Common name	Scientific name and subspecies	Range	Size and ecology	IUCN status and estimated population
Marabou stork	Leptoptilos crumenifer (Lesson, RP, 1831)	Africa south of the Sahara	Size: Habitat: Diet:	LC
Lesser adjutant	Leptoptilos javanicus (Horsfield, 1821)	South and Southeast Asia, from India and Sri Lanka to Indonesia	Size: Habitat: Diet:	NT
Greater adjutant	Leptoptilos dubius (Gmelin, JF,, 1789)	northern India to mainland southeast Asia	Size: Habitat: Diet:	NT

=== Fossils ===
There is an ample fossil record of this genus. Many fossils members of the genus were much larger than living species, standing as tall as a man, with the earliest being Leptoptilos falconeri from the Pliocene of Afro-Eurasia. Giant Leptoptilos storks survived into the Late Pleistocene on the Southeast Asian islands of Java (L. titan) and Flores (L. robustus).

- †Leptoptilos falconeri (Early to Late Pliocene of south Asia and east Africa)
- †Leptoptilos indicus (Late Pliocene of Siwalik, India) – formerly Cryptociconia indica, may be the same as L. falconeri (Louchart et al. 2005)
- †Leptoptilos lui (Middle Pleistocene of Jinniushan, Liaoning, China)
- †Leptoptilos patagonicus (Puerto Madryn Late Miocene of Valdés Peninsula, Argentina)
- †Leptoptilos pliocenicus (Early Pliocene of Odesa, Ukraine and Urugus, Ethiopia to Late Pliocene of Koro Toro, Chad and Olduvai, Tanzania) – includes L. cf. falconeri, may be the same as L. falconeri
- †Leptoptilos richae (Beglia Late Miocene of Bled ed Douarah, Tunisia, and Wadi Moghara, Egypt?)
- †Leptoptilos robustus (Pleistocene, Flores, Indonesia)
- †Leptoptilos titan (Notopuro Middle/Late Pleistocene of Watualang, Java, Indonesia)
- †Leptoptilos sp. (Ngorora Formation Late Miocene of Baringo District, Kenya: Louchart et al. 2005)

†Leptoptilos siwalicensis from the Siwalik deposits (Late Miocene? to Late Pliocene) may belong to this genus or to a closely related one (Louchart et al. 2005).
