= Leptoptilos falconeri =

Leptoptilos falconeri Temporal range: Pliocene to Early Pleistocene, 5.3–1.8 Ma

Scientific classification
- Kingdom: Animalia
- Phylum: Chordata
- Class: Aves
- Order: Ciconiiformes
- Family: Ciconiidae
- Genus: Leptoptilos
- Species: †L. falconeri

Binomial name
- †Leptoptilos falconeri Milne−Edwards, 1868

Extinct species of stork

Leptoptilos falconeri is an extinct species of large-bodied stork that lived during Pliocene to Pleistocene of Sivalik Hills of India, with also being known from Africa, specifically Chad and Ethiopia, though it might have also inhabited Ukraine. Although not the oldest fossil species of the genus Leptoptilos (as several date to earlier times such as the Miocene) it was the first fossil species of the genus to be described. Furthermore, it was the largest known species of stork ever and amongst the tallest and heaviest flying birds known to have existed, having reached at least 2 m (6 ft 7 in) in height.

== Discovery and naming ==
The fossils of Leptoptilos falconeri were discovered in the typical Sivalik Hills from an uncertain horizon. However the material are described to be the part of Captain Proby Cautley's collection, who collected numerous remains from Sivaliks of northern India while working in the Yamuna and Ganges irrigation.

Later Alphonse Milne-Edwards noticed the remains in the British Museum and described them as Argala falconeri. The species name, falconeri was named in honor of Hugh Falconer for his contribution in Sivalik Hills paleontology while working with Proby Cautley. Later in 1886, Richard Lydekker recombined the name into the genus Leptoptilos, resulting in a new combination Leptoptilos falconeri.

== Distribution ==
Leptoptilos has an extensive fossil record, extending not only to Asia and Africa but to Europe and even to South America. Leptoptilos falconeri, in particular, appears to have been a widely found species. Despite its type specimen being from India, extensive fossil records show it was distributed well into Africa, from deposits within Ethiopia, Chad and Egypt as well as possibly Kenya. Analysis by Louchart, et al. (2005) suggested that an excessive number of Leptoptilos had been described and that L. falconeri is the only species for which there is strong evidence of it being present in the Pliocene, making the lineage of extant Leptoptilos species somewhat ambiguous. Given its unique osteological characteristics, it is thought to be unlikely that L. falconeri is the ancestor of any living stork in the genus Leptoptilos.

== Description and life history ==
Leptoptilos falconeri was similar in adaptations to a somewhat better-known cousin from a younger insular fossil species from Flores, Leptoptilos robustus, that also grew to very large dimensions, although current estimated sizes for that species are slightly smaller than L. falconeri. It can be inferred from the recorded dimensions of the bones that L. falconeri was substantially taller and heavier than other species of Leptoptilos. Much like L. robustus, L. falconeri showed reduced forelimb size relative to its otherwise oversized, robust skeletal structure, suggesting limited flying abilities (though, perhaps unlike L. robustus, it is not currently opined to have been completely flightlessness) and a strongly terrestrial lifestyle. The most striking feature of L. falconeri fossils are its very large size. It is estimated that this species attained an average height of 200 cm (6 ft 7 in) and weighed approximately 20 kg (44 lb), larger than other good-sized fossil species such as Leptoptilos titan (and the aforementioned L. robustus). L. falconeri was taller than the tallest extant flying bird, the up to 180 cm (5 ft 11 in) sarus crane, and substantially heavier than the heaviest flying birds such as condors, swans or large bustards. While the largest members of the bustard family can weigh up to perhaps 18 kg (40 lb) or more, these largest living flying species average only around 11 to 12 kg (24 to 26 lb), about 45% less heavier on average than L. falconeri.

All three modern species of the genus Leptoptilos are large, bulky storks which forage extensive in open areas, switching between the lifestyle of being a scavenger on carrion, unlike other storks, and then alternating usually to more nutritious small, live prey such as fish and invertebrates when feeding nestlings (although the smaller lesser adjutant more infrequently engages in scavenging that the other two species). Since the specifics of the life history of fossil storks are difficult to infer, it can be more or less assumed that fossil Leptoptilos led a similar lifestyle to the modern species. However, given the much larger sizes and limited flight of large species such as L. falconeri this may have facilitated a more cursorial foraging style and more active predation on sometimes substantial prey. While modern species are not usually actively predatory, locally marabou storks are considered the most substantial threat to colonies of lesser flamingoes and have been shown to dispatch even adult flamingoes.
