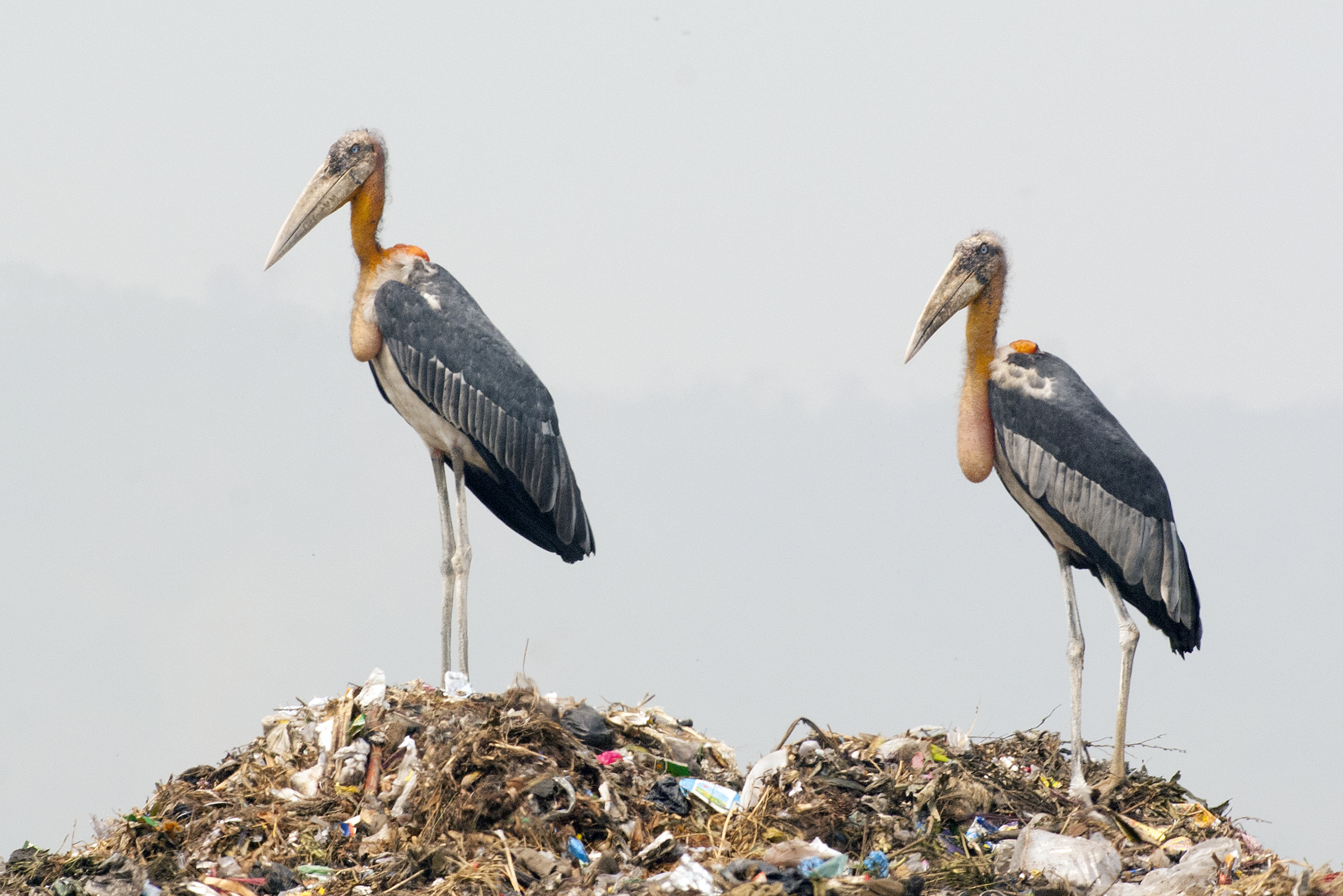
- Two adults, on the right with breeding plumage, at a garbage dump in Assam

Conservation status
- Near Threatened (IUCN 3.1)

Scientific classification
- Kingdom: Animalia
- Phylum: Chordata
- Class: Aves
- Order: Ciconiiformes
- Family: Ciconiidae
- Genus: Leptoptilos
- Species: L. dubius

Binomial name
- Leptoptilos dubius (Gmelin, JF, 1789)
- Breeding range Resident non-breeding range Seasonal non-breeding range

Synonyms
- Leptoptilus argala Ardea dubia Leptoptilus giganteus Argala migratoria

= Greater adjutant =

Species of bird

The greater adjutant (Leptoptilos dubius) is a member of the stork family, Ciconiidae. Its genus includes the lesser adjutant of Asia and the marabou stork of Africa. Once found widely across southern Asia and mainland southeast Asia, the greater adjutant is now restricted to a much smaller range with only three breeding populations; two in India, one in the north-eastern state of Assam and a smaller one around Bhagalpur; and another breeding population in Cambodia. They disperse widely after the breeding season. This large stork has a massive wedge-shaped bill, a bare head and a distinctive neck pouch. During the day, it soars in thermals along with vultures with whom it shares the habit of scavenging. They feed mainly on carrion and offal; however, they are opportunistic and will sometimes prey on vertebrates. The English name is derived from their stiff "military" gait when walking on the ground (see adjutant). Large numbers once lived in Asia, but they have declined (possibly due to improved sanitation) to the point of endangerment. The total population in 2008 was estimated at around a thousand individuals. In the 19th century, they were especially common in the city of Calcutta, where they were referred to as the "Calcutta adjutant" and included in the coat of arms for the city. Known locally as hargila (derived from the Assamese words har, 'bone', and gila, 'swallower', thus 'bone-swallower') and considered to be unclean birds, they were largely left undisturbed but sometimes hunted for the use of their meat in folk medicine. Valued as scavengers, they were once depicted in the logo of the Calcutta Municipal Corporation.

== Taxonomy ==
The greater adjutant was described in 1785 by the English ornithologist John Latham as the "giant crane" in his book A General Synopsis of Birds. Latham based his own description on that given by Edward Ives in his A Voyage from England to India that was published in 1773. Ives had shot a specimen near Calcutta. In his account Latham also mentioned that he had learned from the traveller Henry Smeathman that a similar species was found in Africa. When in 1789 the German naturalist Johann Friedrich Gmelin revised and expanded Carl Linnaeus's Systema Naturae, he included the greater adjutant, coined the binomial name Ardea dubia and cited Latham's work. Gmelin did not mention the coloured plate of the bird that Latham included in his 1787 Supplement to the General Synopsis of Birds. Latham based his plate on a drawing in the collection of Lady Impey that had been made of a live bird in India.

There was some confusion as to whether the African marabou stork represented a separate species. In 1790 Latham in his Index Ornithologicus repeated his earlier description of the Indian species but gave the location as Africa and coined the binomial name Ardea argala. Finally, in 1831 the French naturalist René Lesson described the differences between the two species and coined Circonia crumenisa for the marabou stork.

The greater adjutant is now placed with the lesser adjutant and the marabou stork in the genus Leptoptilos that was introduced in 1831 by the French naturalist René Lesson. The species is monotypic: no subspecies are recognised.

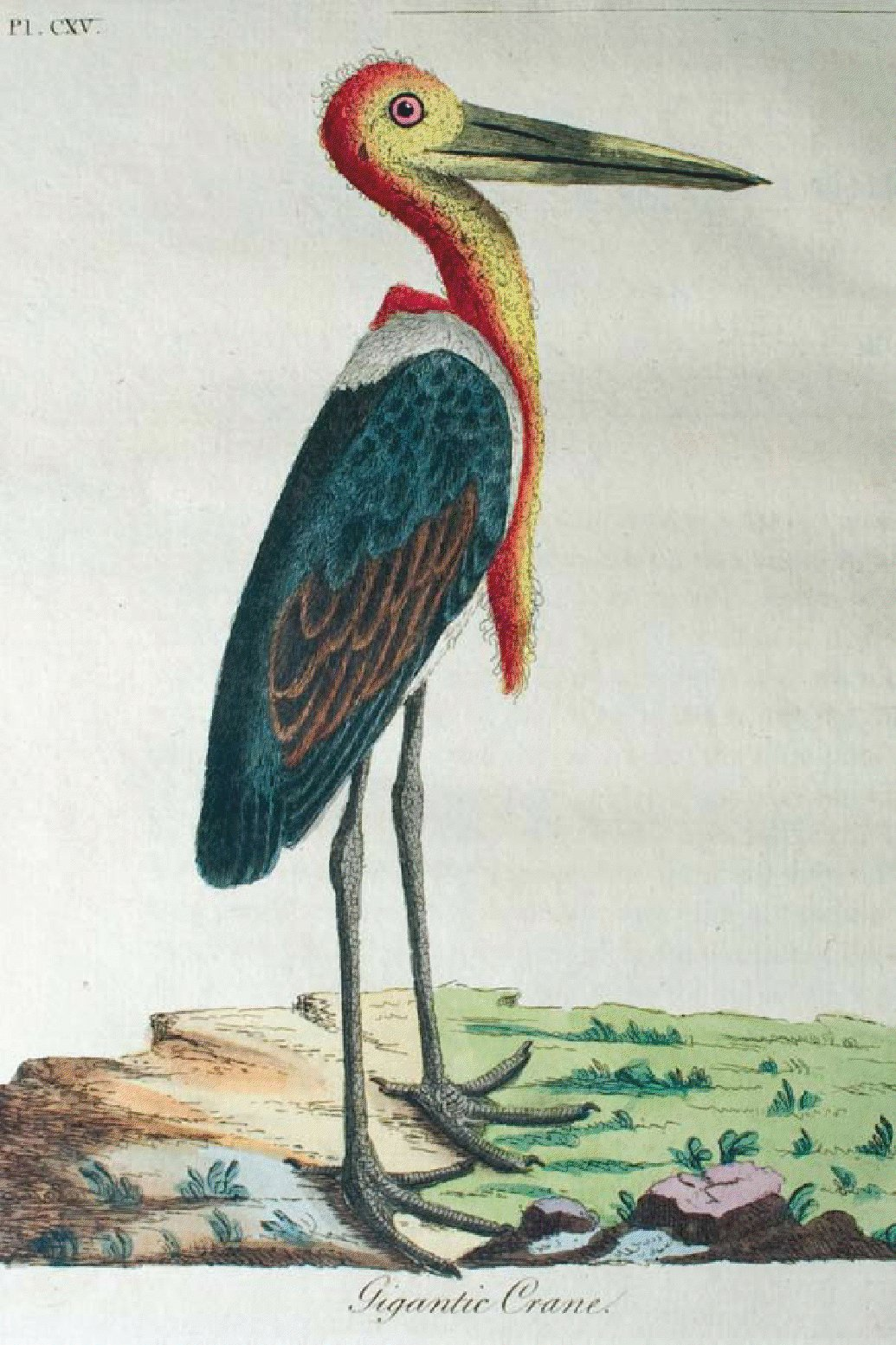
"Gigantic Crane" from Latham's Supplement to the General Synopsis of Birds (1787)

The marabou stork of Africa looks somewhat similar but their disjunct distribution ranges, differences in bill structure, plumage, and display behaviour support their treatment as separate species.

Most storks fly with their neck outstretched, but the three Leptoptilos species retract their neck in flight as herons do, possibly due to the heavy bill. When walking on the ground, it has a stiff marching gait from which the name "adjutant" is derived.

== Description ==
The greater adjutant is a huge bird, standing tall at 145–150 cm (4 ft 9 in – 4 ft 11 in). The average length is 136 cm (4 ft 6 in) and average wingspan is 250 cm (8 ft 2 in), it may rival its cousin the marabou stork (Leptoptilos crumeniferus) as the largest winged extant stork. While no weights have been published for wild birds, the greater adjutant is among the largest of living storks, with published measurements overlapping with those of the jabiru (Jabiru mycteria), saddle-billed stork (Ephippiorhynchus senegalensis) and marabou stork (Leptoptilos crumeniferus). Juvenile greater adjutant storks in captivity weighed from 8 to 11 kg (18 to 24 lb). A greater adjutant after recuperating in captivity from after injury during nest collapse was found to weigh 4.71 kg (10.4 lb) as a nestling and to weigh 8 kg (18 lb) after reaching maturity and ready for re-release. For comparison, the heaviest known wild stork was a marabou stork scaling 8.9 kg (20 lb), with adult marabou ranging from 4–6.8 kg (8.8–15.0 lb) (females) and 5.6–8.9 kg (12–20 lb) (males). The huge bill, which averages 32.2 cm (12.7 in) long, is wedge-like and is pale grey with a darker base. The wing chord averages 80.5 cm (31.7 in), the tail 31.8 cm (12.5 in) and the tarsus 32.4 cm (12.8 in) in length. With the exception of the tarsus length, the standard measurements of the greater adjutant are on average greater than that of other stork species. A white collar ruff at the base of its bare yellow to red-skinned neck gives it a vulture-like appearance. In the breeding season, the pouch and neck become bright orange and the upper thighs of the grey legs turn reddish. Adults have a dark wing that contrasts with light grey secondary coverts. The underside of the body is whitish and the sexes are indistinguishable in the field. Juveniles are a duller version of the adult. The pendant inflatable pouch connects to the air passages and is not connected to the digestive tract. The exact function is unknown, but it is not involved in food storage as was sometimes believed. This was established in 1825 by Dr. John Adam, a student of Professor Robert Jameson, who dissected a specimen and found the two-layered pouch filled mainly with air. The only possible confusable species in the region is the smaller lesser adjutant (Leptoptilos javanicus), which lacks a pouch, prefers wetland habitats, has a lighter grey skull cap, a straighter edge to the upper mandible, and lacks the contrast between the grey secondary coverts and the dark wings.

Like other storks, it lacks intrinsic muscles in the syrinx and produces sound mainly by bill-clattering, although low grunting, mooing or roaring sounds are made especially when nesting. The bill-clattering display is made with the bill raised high and differs from that of the closely related African marabou which holds the bill pointed downwards.

== Distribution ==
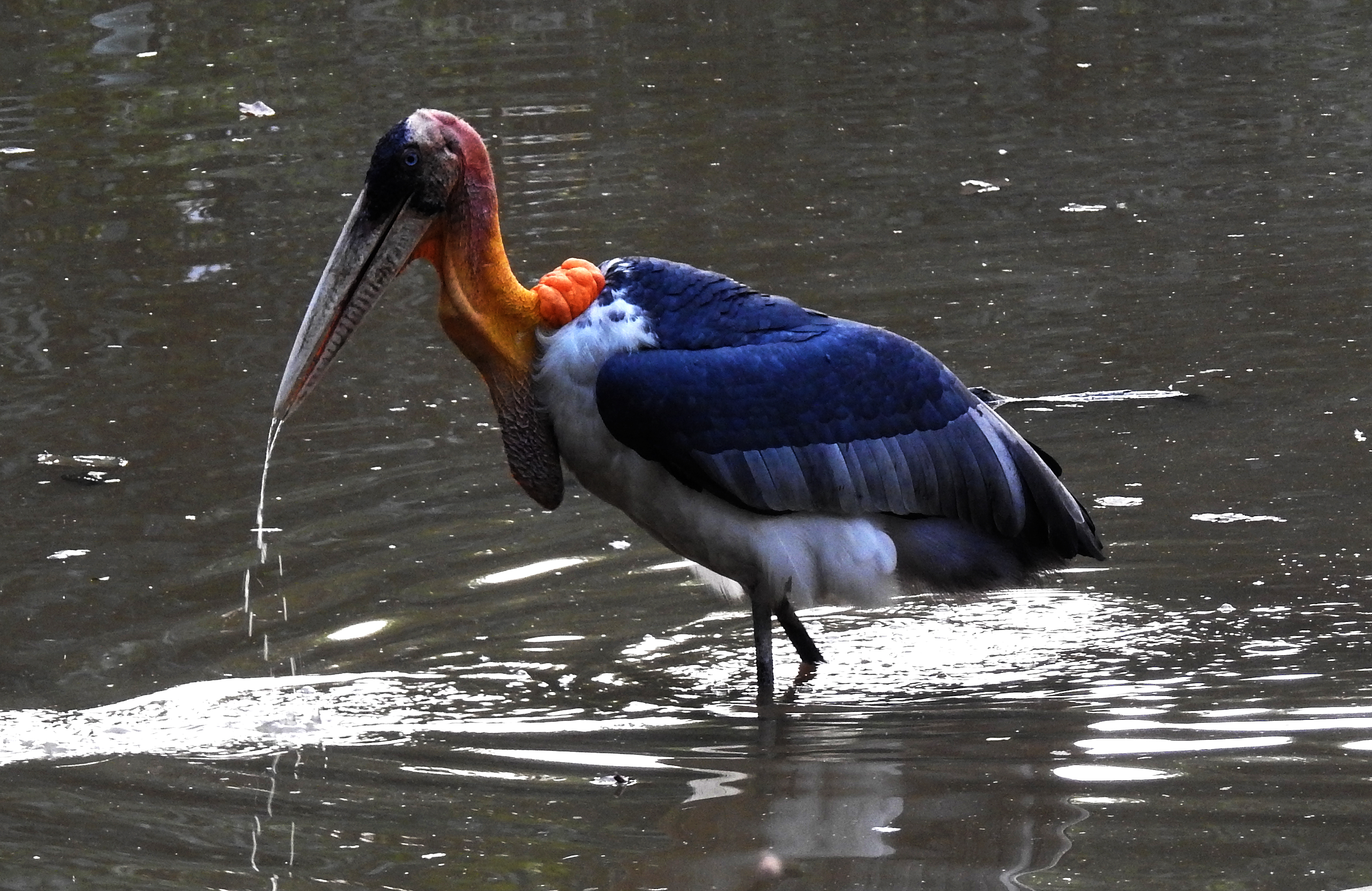
Greater adjutant in water (Kaziranga, Assam)

This species was once a widespread winter visitor in the riverine plains of northern India. However, their breeding areas were largely unknown for a long time until a very large nesting colony was finally discovered in 1877 at Shwaygheen on the Sittaung River, Pegu, Burma. It was believed that the Indian birds bred there. This breeding colony, which also included spot-billed pelicans (Pelecanus philippensis), declined in size and entirely vanished by the 1930s. Subsequently, a nest site in Kaziranga was the only known breeding area until new sites were discovered in Assam, the Tonle Sap lake and in the Kulen Promtep Wildlife Sanctuary. In 1989, the breeding population in Assam was estimated at 115 birds, and between 1994 and 1996 the population in the Brahmaputra valley was considered to be about 600. A small colony with about 35 nests was discovered near Bhagalpur in 2006. The number increased to 75 nests in 2014. Fossil evidence suggests that the species possibly (since there were several other species in the genus that are now extinct) occurred in northern Vietnam around 6000 years ago. The IUCN notes their extant range is Cambodia and India, while they are probably extinct in Bangladesh, Laos, Myanmar, Nepal, Pakistan, Thailand, and Vietnam.

During the non-breeding season, storks in the Indian region disperse widely, mainly in the Gangetic Plains. Sightings from the Deccan region are rare. Records of flocks from further south, near Mahabalipuram, have been questioned. In the 1800s, adjutant storks were extremely common within the city of Calcutta during the summer and rainy season. These aggregations along the Ghats of Calcutta, however, declined and vanished altogether by the early 1900s. Improved sanitation has been suggested as a cause of their decline. Birds were recorded in Bangladesh in the 1850s, breeding somewhere in the Sundarbans, but have not been recorded subsequently.

== Behaviour and ecology ==
The greater adjutant is usually seen singly or in small groups as it stalks about in shallow lakes or drying lake beds and garbage dumps. It is often found in the company of kites and vultures and will sometimes sit hunched still for long durations. They may also hold their wings outstretched, presumably to control their temperature. They soar on thermals using their large outstretched wings.

=== Breeding ===
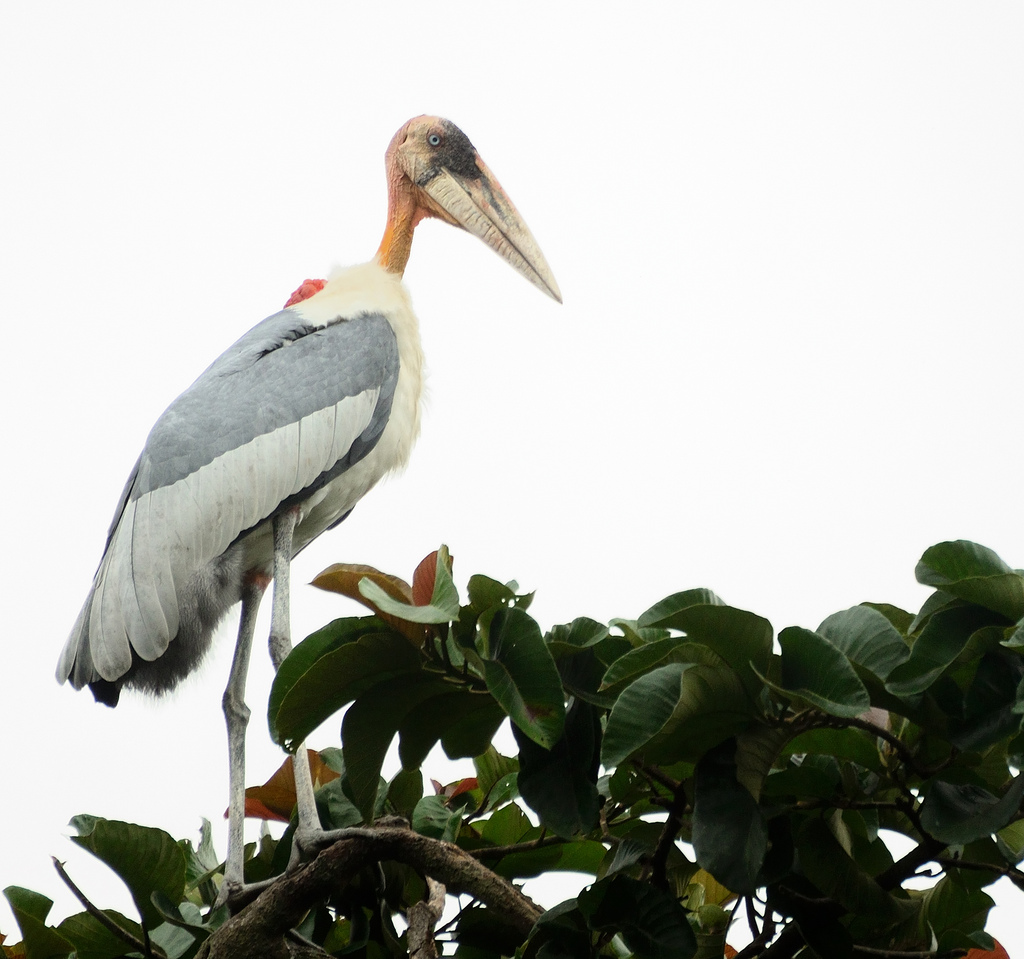
Greater adjutant stork in breeding plumage, perched near nest (Assam)

The greater adjutant breeds during winter in colonies that may include other large waterbirds such as the spot-billed pelican. The nest is a large platform of twigs placed at the end of a near-horizontal branch of a tall tree. Nests are rarely placed in forks near the center of a tree, allowing the birds to fly easily from and to the nests. In the Nagaon nesting colony in Assam, tall Alstonia scholaris and Anthocephalus cadamba were favourite nest trees. The beginning of the breeding season is marked by several birds congregating and trying to occupy a tree. While crowding at these sites, male birds mark out their nesting territories, chasing away others and frequently pointing their bill upwards while clattering them. They may also arch their body and hold their wings half open and drooped. When a female perches nearby, the male plucks fresh twigs and places it before her. The male may also grasp the tarsus of the female with the bill or hold his bill close to her in a preening gesture. A female that has paired holds the bill and head to the breast of the male and the male locks her by holding his bill over her neck. Other displays include simultaneous bill raising and lowering by a pair. The clutch, usually of three or four white eggs, is laid at intervals of one or two days and incubation begins after the first egg is laid. Both parents incubate and the eggs hatch at intervals of one or two days, each taking about 35 days from the date of laying. Adults at the nest have their legs covered with their droppings and this behaviour termed as urohidrosis is believed to aid in cooling during hot weather. Adults may also spread out their wings and shade the chicks. The chicks are fed at the nest for about five months. The chicks double in size in a week and can stand and walk on the nest platform when they are a month old. At five weeks, the juveniles leap frequently and can defend themselves. The parent birds leave the young alone for longer periods at this stage. The young birds leave the nest and fly around the colony when about four months but continue to be fed occasionally by the parents.

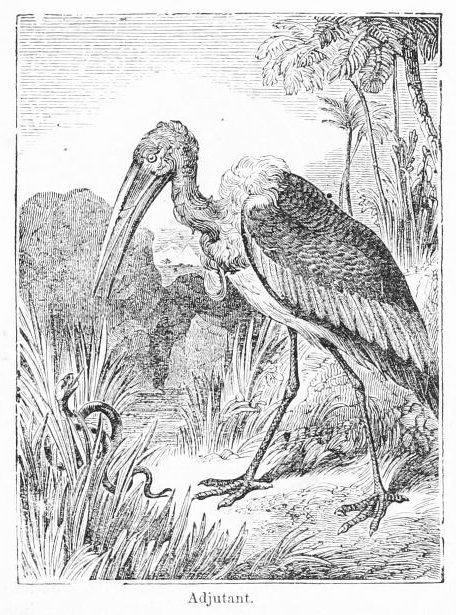
An 1855 illustration depicting the stork hunting a snake

=== Feeding ===
The greater adjutant is omnivorous and although mainly a scavenger, it preys on frogs and large insects and will also take birds, reptiles and rodents. It has been known to attack wild ducks within reach, swallowing them whole. Greater adjutants also capture many fish, with 36 fish prey species documented in Assam, and many fish taken were large, weighing about 2 to 3 kg (4.4 to 6.6 lb). Their main diet however is carrion, and like the vultures their bare head and neck is an adaptation. They are often found on garbage dumps and will feed on animal and human excreta. In 19th-century Calcutta, they fed on partly burnt human corpses disposed along the Ganges river. In Rajasthan, where it is extremely rare, it has been reported to feed on swarms of desert locusts (Schistocerca gregaria) but this has been questioned.

=== Parasites, diseases and mortality ===
At least two species of bird lice, Colpocephalum cooki and Ciconiphilus temporalis have been found as ectoparasites. Healthy adult birds have no natural predators, and the only recorded causes of premature mortality are due to the direct or indirect actions of humans; such as, poisoning, shooting, or electrocution such as when the birds accidentally fly into telephone lines. Captive birds have been found to be susceptible to avian influenza, (H5N1) and a high mortality rate was noted at a facility in Cambodia, with two-thirds of infected birds dying. The longest recorded life span in captivity was 43 years.

== Status and conservation ==
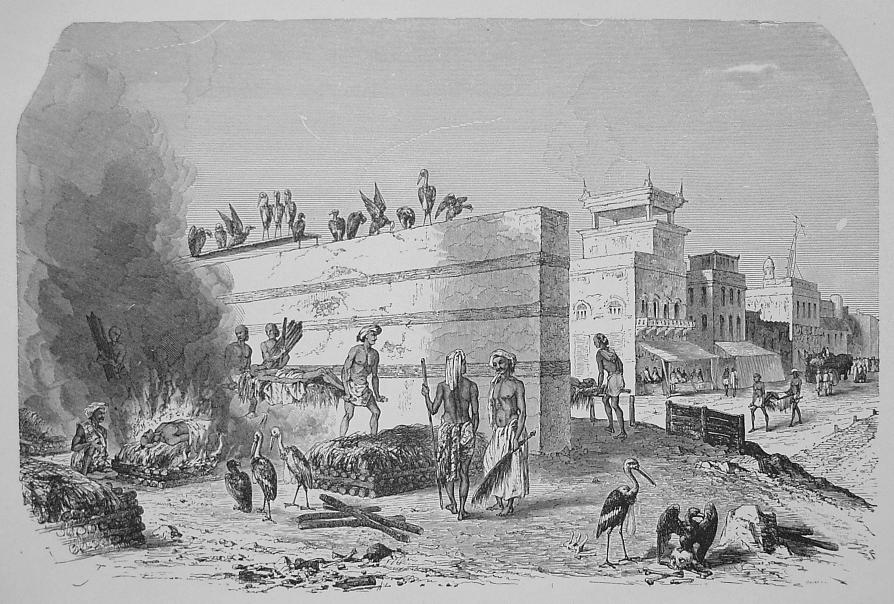
Engraving showing adjutants at the cremation ghat in Calcutta, c. 1877

Loss of nesting and feeding habitat through the draining of wetlands, pollution and other disturbances, together with hunting and egg collection in the past caused a large decline in the population of this species. The world population was estimated 1,360–1,510 mature individuals as of 2023, and this small population appears to be increasing. The greater adjutant is listed as Near Threatened on the IUCN Red List of Threatened Species.

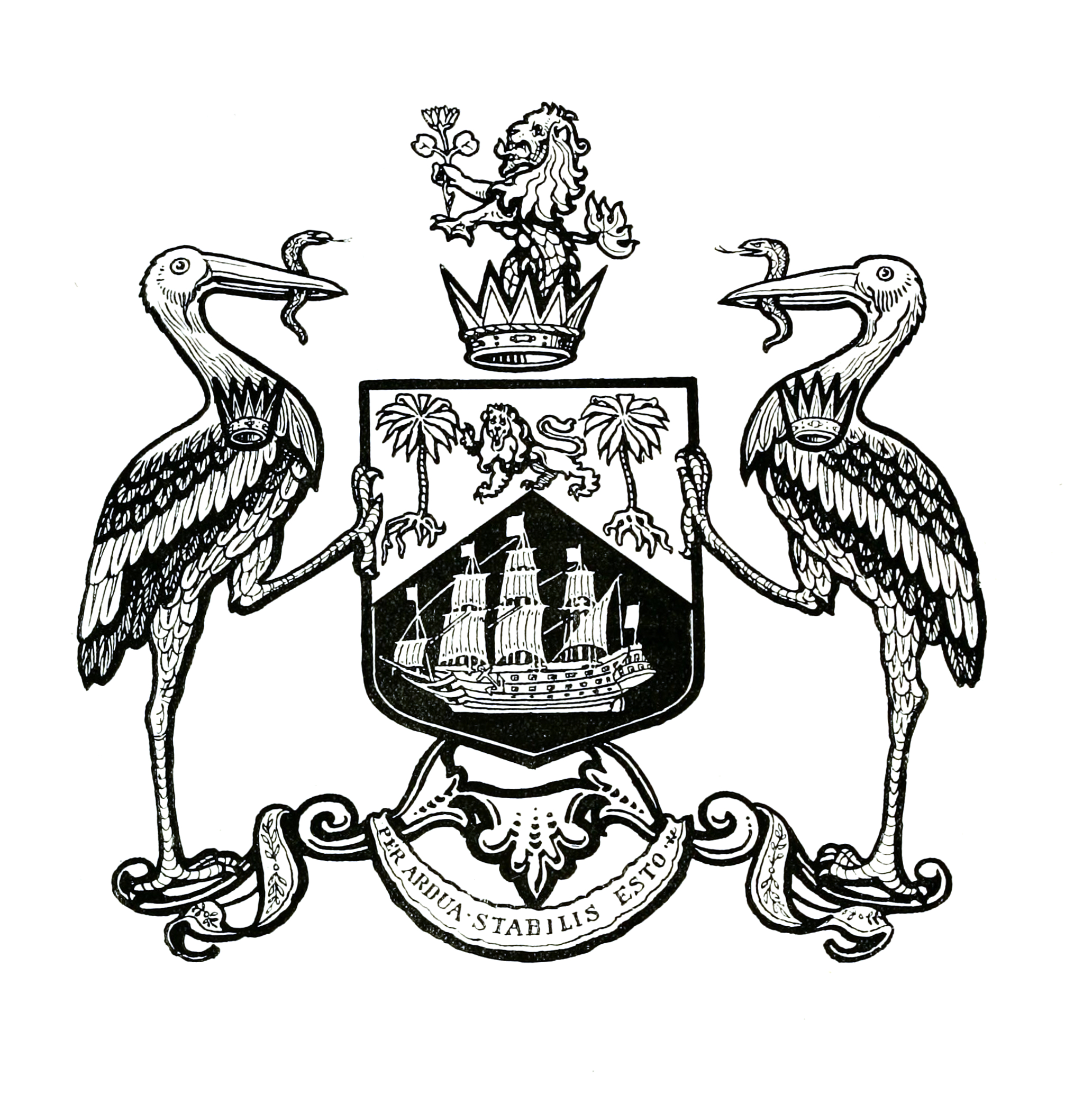
Coat of arms for the city of Calcutta in 1896

Conservation measures have included attempts to breed them in captivity and to reduce fatalities to young at their natural nesting sites. Nearly 15% of the chicks are killed when they fall off the nests and die of starvation, so some conservationists have used nets positioned below the nests to prevent injuries to falling young. These fallen birds are then fed and raised in enclosures for about five months and then released to join their wild siblings.

In Kamrup district, Assam, which is home to one of the few large colonies of greater adjutants, outreach efforts including cultural and religious programming, especially aimed at village women, have rallied residents to conserve the birds. The locals, who formerly regarded the birds as pests, now see the storks as special and take pride in protecting them and the trees in which they breed. Locals have even added prayers for the safety of the storks to hymns, and included stork designs to the motifs used in traditional weaving. Similar measures have been used with success in other parts of India where adjutants breed.

Once regarded as a bird of ill omen, the endangered Greater adjutant has seen a shift in perception, gaining strong community support. Conservation efforts in Assam have helped stabilize and gradually increase its population. In 2007, biologist Purnima Devi Barman witnessed widespread habitat destruction in Dadra village. Her efforts later played a key role in mobilizing local communities to protect the species.

== In culture ==
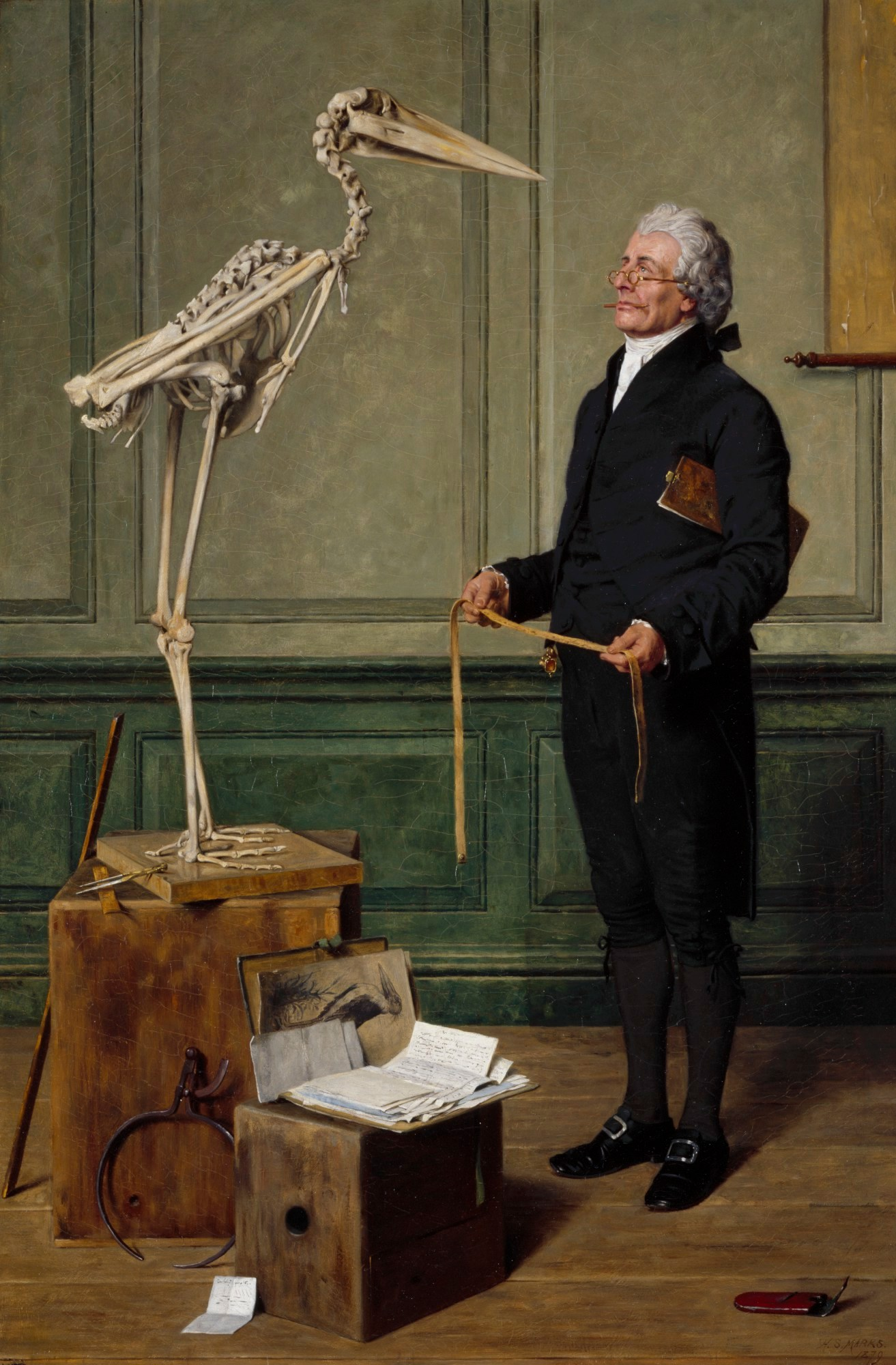
Science is Measurement (1879) by Henry Stacy Marks

Aelian described the bird in 250 AD in his De Natura Animalium as the kilas (κηλας), a large bird from India with a crop that looks like a leather bag. Babur described it in his memoirs under the name of ding. In Victorian times the greater adjutant was known as the gigantic crane and later as the Asiatic marabou. It was very common in Calcutta during the rainy season and large numbers could be seen at garbage sites and also standing on the top of buildings. In Bihar, the bird is associated with the mythical bird garuda. Its name hargila in Bengal and Assam is said to be derived from the Sanskrit roots had for "bone" and gila – "to swallow"- and describes the bird as a "bone swallower". John Latham used the Latinized form as the species epithet in the binomial name, Ardea argala. Young British soldiers were known to harass these birds for fun, even blowing up birds by feeding them meat containing bones packed with a cartridge and fuse. The birds in Calcutta were considered to be efficient scavengers and an act was passed to protect them. Anyone who injured or killed a bird had to pay a hefty fine of fifty rupees. The coat of arms of the city of Calcutta issued through two patents on 26 December 1896 included two adjutant birds with serpents in their beaks and charged on their shoulder with an Eastern Crown as supporters. The motto read "Per ardua stabilis esto", Latin for "steadfast through trouble". The arms were included in the logo of official bodies such as the Calcutta Municipal Corporation and the Calcutta Scottish regiment. Captured birds, probably from Calcutta, reached menageries in Europe during this period.

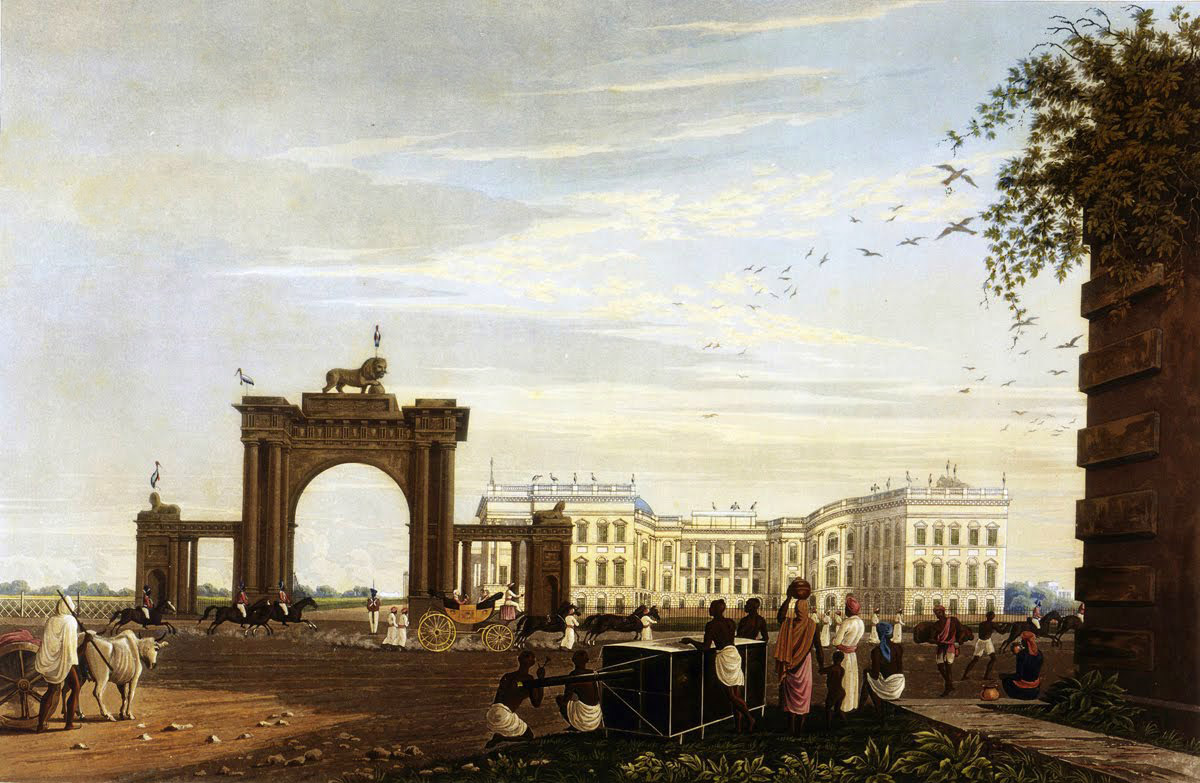
A view of Calcutta in 1819 by R. Havell Jr. based on James Baillie Fraser showing a number of greater adjutants standing on the buildings

The undertail covert feathers taken from adjutant were exported to London during the height of the plume trade under the name of Commercolly (or Kumarkhali, now in Bangladesh) or "marabout". Since the birds were protected by law, plume collectors would ambush the birds roosting atop buildings, grabbing their undertail feathers which would come off when the birds took to flight. Along with egret plumes, these were the most valuable of feather exports. Specimens of tippets, victorines and boas made from these feathers were displayed at the Great Exhibition of 1851.

An Indian myth recorded by the Moghul emperor Babur was that a magic "snake-stone" existed inside the skull of the bird, being an antidote for all snake venoms and poisons. This "stone" was supposed to be extremely rare as it could only be obtained by a hunter with great skill, for the bird had to be killed without letting its bill touch the ground since that would make the "stone" evaporate instantly. Folk-medicine practitioners believed that a piece of stork flesh chewed daily with betel could cure leprosy.

The English artist Henry Stacy Marks (1829-1888) took a special interest in birds. Many of his paintings were based on birds in the London Zoo with several depicting greater adjutants including Convocation (1878), Science is Measurement (1879), Half hours at the Zoo, and An Episcopal Visitation.
