= Borgang =

- village
- Location in Assam, India Borgang (India)
- Coordinates: 26°48′11″N 93°33′16″E
- Country: India
- State: Assam
- District: Sonitpur

Government
  - Body: Gram panchayat

Languages
  - Official: Assamese
- Time zone: UTC+5:30 (IST)
- PIN: 784167
- Telephone code: 03715
- Vehicle registration: AS
- Nearest city: Biswanath Chariali

Borgang is a small village in Sonitpur district in the state of Assam of North East India. It gained township status in 2006. Borgang is surrounded by the tea plantations of Williamson Magor. Borgang River flows through this village. Borgang's Catholic church and hospital were constructed in 1978 and are run by Christian missionaries. The church has paintings on its inner dome by General Reserve Engineer Force serviceman A. Robert Chandra.
