= Borgang River =

River in India

- Location within Assam Location within India
- Native name: বৰগাং নদী (Assamese)

Location
- State: Assam

Physical characteristics
- Source: Daphla Hills
  - location: Arunachal Pradesh
- Mouth: Brahmaputra River
  - location: Pithia Mari, Sonitpur District, Assam
  - coordinates: 26°45′08.4″N 93°19′09.0″E

Basin features
- Progression: Borgang River - Brahmaputra River

The Borgang River is a tributary of the Brahmaputra River in the Indian state of Assam. The Borgang river originates from Daphla Hills of Arunachal Pradesh. After flowing through the Daphla Hills, the river receives its tributary Naomara and Dikal before its confluence with Brahmaputra River. Recently the river has started to erode the adjoining places on the bank of the river at Borgang area causing floods.
