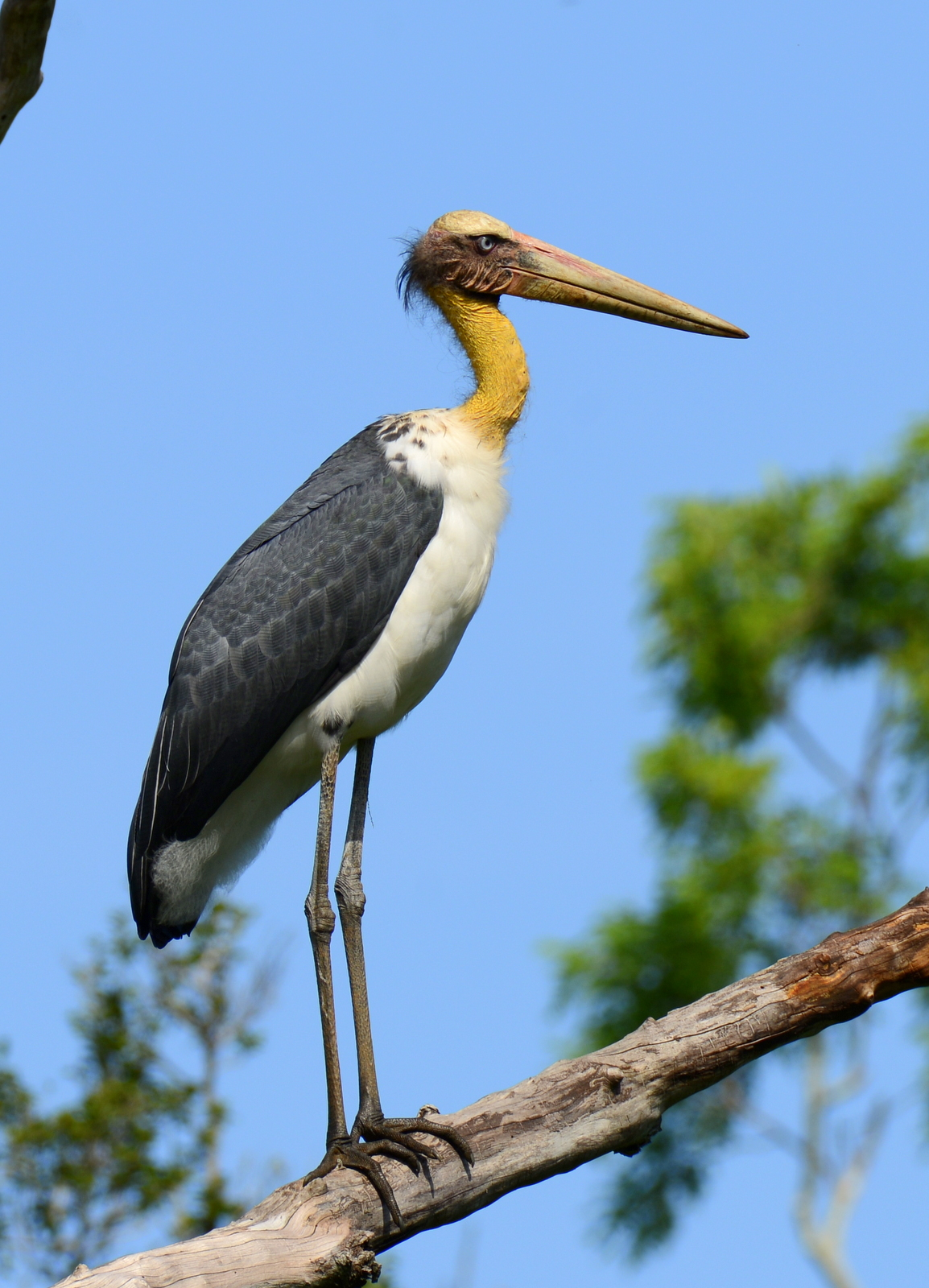
- Lesser adjutant, Yala National Park

Conservation status
- Near Threatened (IUCN 3.1)

Scientific classification
- Kingdom: Animalia
- Phylum: Chordata
- Class: Aves
- Order: Ciconiiformes
- Family: Ciconiidae
- Genus: Leptoptilos
- Species: L. javanicus

Binomial name
- Leptoptilos javanicus (Horsfield, 1821)

= Lesser adjutant =

Species of bird

The lesser adjutant (Leptoptilos javanicus) is a large wading bird in the stork family Ciconiidae. Like other members of its genus, it has a bare neck and head. It is however more closely associated with wetland habitats and agriculture fields where it is solitary and is less likely to scavenge than the related greater adjutant. It is a widespread species that has found from India through Southeast Asia.

== Description ==
A large stork with an upright stance, a bare head and neck without a pendant pouch, it has a length of 87–93 cm (34–37 in) (outstretched from bill-to-tail measurement), weighs from 4 to 5.71 kg (8.8 to 12.6 lb) and stands about 110–120 cm (43–47 in) tall. The only confusable species is the greater adjutant, but this species is generally smaller and has a straight upper bill edge (culmen), measuring 25.8–30.8 cm (10.2–12.1 in) in length, with a paler base and appears slightly trimmer and less hunch-backed. The skullcap is paler and the upper plumage is uniformly dark, appearing almost all black. The nearly naked head and neck have a few scattered hair-like feathers. The upper shank or tibia is grey rather than pink, the tarsus measures 22.5–26.8 cm (8.9–10.6 in). The belly and undertail are white. Juveniles are a duller version of the adult but have more feathers on the nape. During the breeding season, the face is reddish and the neck is orange. The larger median wing coverts are tipped with copper spots and the inner secondary coverts and tertials have narrow white edging. The wing chord measures 57.5–66 cm (22.6–26.0 in) in length. Like others in the genus, they retract their necks in flight. In flight, the folded neck can appear like the pouch of the greater adjutant. Males and females appear similar in plumage but males tend to be larger and heavier billed.

== Distribution and habitat ==
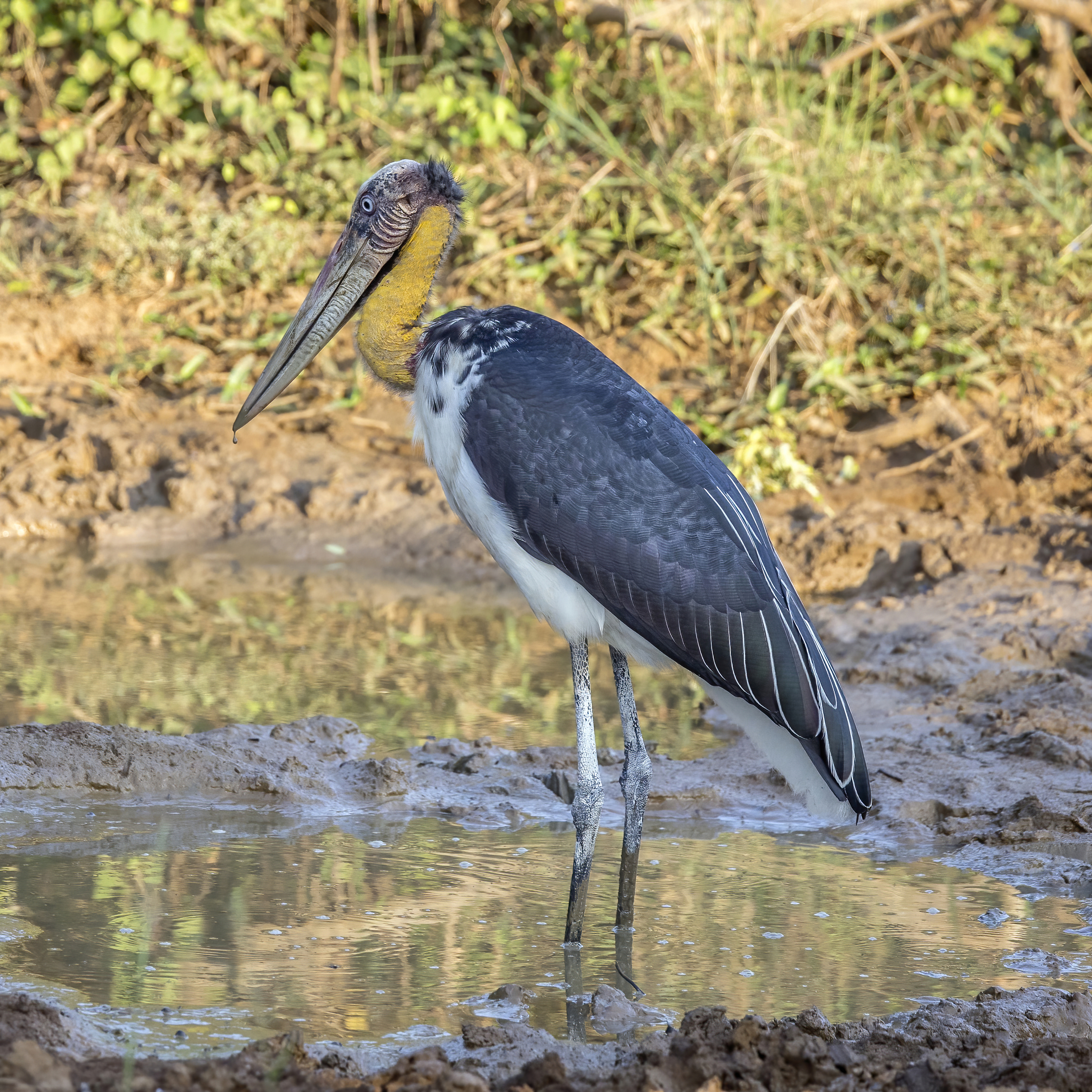
In Sri Lanka

The lesser adjutant is often found in large rivers and lakes inside well wooded regions, in freshwater wetlands in agricultural areas, and coastal wetlands including mudflats and mangroves. It is found in India, Nepal, Sri Lanka, Bangladesh (a colony with about 6 nests and 20 individuals was discovered near Thakurgaon in 2011), Myanmar, Thailand, Vietnam, Malaysia, Laos, Singapore, Indonesia and Cambodia. The largest population is in Cambodia. In India they are mainly distributed in the eastern states of Assam, West Bengal and Bihar. It may occur as a vagrant on the southern edge of Bhutan. They are extremely rare in southern India found largely on the west coat. In Sri Lanka, they are found in lowland areas largely within protected areas, though they also use forested wetlands and crop fields. In Nepal, surveys in eastern districts had suggested that they preferentially use forested patches with small wetlands, largely avoiding crop fields. Additional studies, however, have shown the storks having starkly different requirements - breeding densities and breeding success of Lesser Adjutant across lowland Nepal are much higher on croplands.

== Behaviour and ecology ==
The lesser adjutant stalks around wetlands feeding mainly on fish, frogs, reptiles, large invertebrates, rodents, small mammals and rarely carrion. Location of prey appears to be entirely visual, with one observation of storks sitting on telegraphic poles apparently scanning a marsh for prey.

They are largely silent but have been noted to clatter their bill, hiss and moan at the nest. During one of the threat displays called the "Arching display" that is given in the presence of intruders, adults extend their neck and sometimes give a hoarse wail.

Courtship behaviour of the lesser adjutant is identical to other species of the genus Leptoptilos. During pair formation, female birds lift their heads in a scooping motion with bill-clattering (called the "Balancing Posture"). They are solitary except during the breeding season when they form loose colonies, never exceeding 20 nests in a single colony. The breeding season is February to May in southern India and November to January in north-eastern India, beginning as early as July. In central lowland Nepal, nesting in 2015 began in July, and new colonies continued to be initiated until November. The nest is a large platform of sticks placed on a tall tree. In Nepal, nest initiations started in mid-September continuing until mid-November, with all chicks fledging by late-January. The nest diameter is more than a meter and up to a meter deep. The clutch consists of two to four white eggs that are rapidly soiled during incubation. Incubation period is 28–30 days.

In eastern Nepal, four colonies consisting of 61 nests were all built on the tree species Haldina cordifolia and Bombax ceiba. In central lowland Nepal, 35 colonies with 101 nests were located on four tree species namely Haldina cordifolia, Bombax ceiba, Ficus benghalensis and Ficus religiosa with the majority of colonies located on Bombax ceiba trees. Another study the subsequent year across five locations along lowland Nepal monitored 65 colonies with 206 nests from which 280 chicks fledged, and the most frequently used tree species were B. ceiba, H. cordifolia and F. religiosa respectively. Other tree species on which nests have been found in India and Myanmar include Alstonia scholaris and Salmalia malabarica with some nests located as high as 46 m. Nests have not yet been located in Sri Lanka, though young birds have been observed feeding in crop fields and in freshwater wetlands. The average size of 35 colonies with a total of 101 nests in central, lowland Nepal was 2.9 nests, ranging in size from one nest to 13 nests. Location of colonies in central lowland Nepal was not related to tree density available on the landscape suggesting that nest trees are still adequate here. However, lesser adjutant storks strongly selected non-domestic trees almost entirely, also preferring trees that were much taller and bigger relative to available trees on the landscape. Religious beliefs and agro-forestry practices appear to be responsible for retaining trees that are preferred by lesser adjutants for locating their colonies.

Breeding success in lowland Nepal was positively correlated to colony size, possibly due to reduced predation at colonies. Colony-level breeding success was also impacted by extent of wetlands around colonies, which ameliorated negative impacts of proximity to human habitation. Colonies located on trees in agricultural landscapes of lowland Nepal had a higher breeding success relative to colonies located on trees in forested areas or protected wetland preserves suggesting that current agricultural practices with one season of flooded crops (rice during the monsoon season) followed by winter crops that need some pulsed irrigation (e.g. wheat) are conducive to Lesser Adjutant breeding. Multi-site evaluations showed Lesser Adjutants used cues such as tree height to locate colonies, with taller trees hosting bigger colonies, which in turn resulted in higher fledging success.

Adult storks took an average of 30 minutes to return to nests with food for nestlings and fledglings, though there was considerable variation in this measure. Time taken to return to nests by adults was impacted by colony size, age of chicks, amount of wetlands around colonies, and the progression of the season. Adults returned faster when brood sizes were higher, but took longer to return as chicks aged. The breeding season in Nepal extended from the middle of the monsoon, when the primary crop on the landscape was flooded rice, to winter, when the cropping was much more mixed and the landscape was much drier. This variation was clearly represented in the changing amount of time it took adults to return to nest after finding food. They returned much faster during the monsoon, but took longer when the crops changed and the landscape dried out suggesting that changing cropping patterns can have serious implications on their ability to raise chicks.

A lesser adjutant paired and hybridized with a painted stork at Dehiwala Zoo, Sri Lanka and at Kuala Lumpur Zoo. The hybrid young had plumage and bill-size of the adjutant, but stance and bill shape of the painted stork.

== Conservation ==
Lesser adjutants were downlisted from Vulnerable to Near Threatened by the IUCN in 2023 due to new findings in Nepal that showed the largest populations to occur in multi-cropped agricultural mosaics with community-use wetlands, rather than in forested areas with wetlands that had been incorrectly assumed to be the primary habitat of this species. The new findings also helped increase the assumed population size of the species considerably showing that colonies nesting on trees in agricultural areas has relatively high breeding success. In Nepal, lesser adjutants appear to be adaptable to human presence as long as agricultural practices help retain nesting trees and retail some wetland habitats on the landscape. The habit of lesser adjutants using agricultural areas has incorrectly led status assessments to assume that it is a threatened species. In Nepal, where the largest known breeding population occurs, the greatest threat appears to be conversion of agricultural land to urban areas. Though many nesting are felled each year in Nepal, the long-standing practice of agroforestry (especially planting Bombax ceiba) and reverence towards certain trees (e.g. Ficus sp.) has ensured that the storks have adequate nesting trees scattered widely across large swathes of agricultural areas. in Nepal Like many other large waterbirds, the southeast Asian populations of lesser adjutant storks appear to be greatly at risk due to a combination of hunting and habitat destruction. As of 2023, the global population is estimated to be 5,000–15,000 mature individuals.

== Images ==
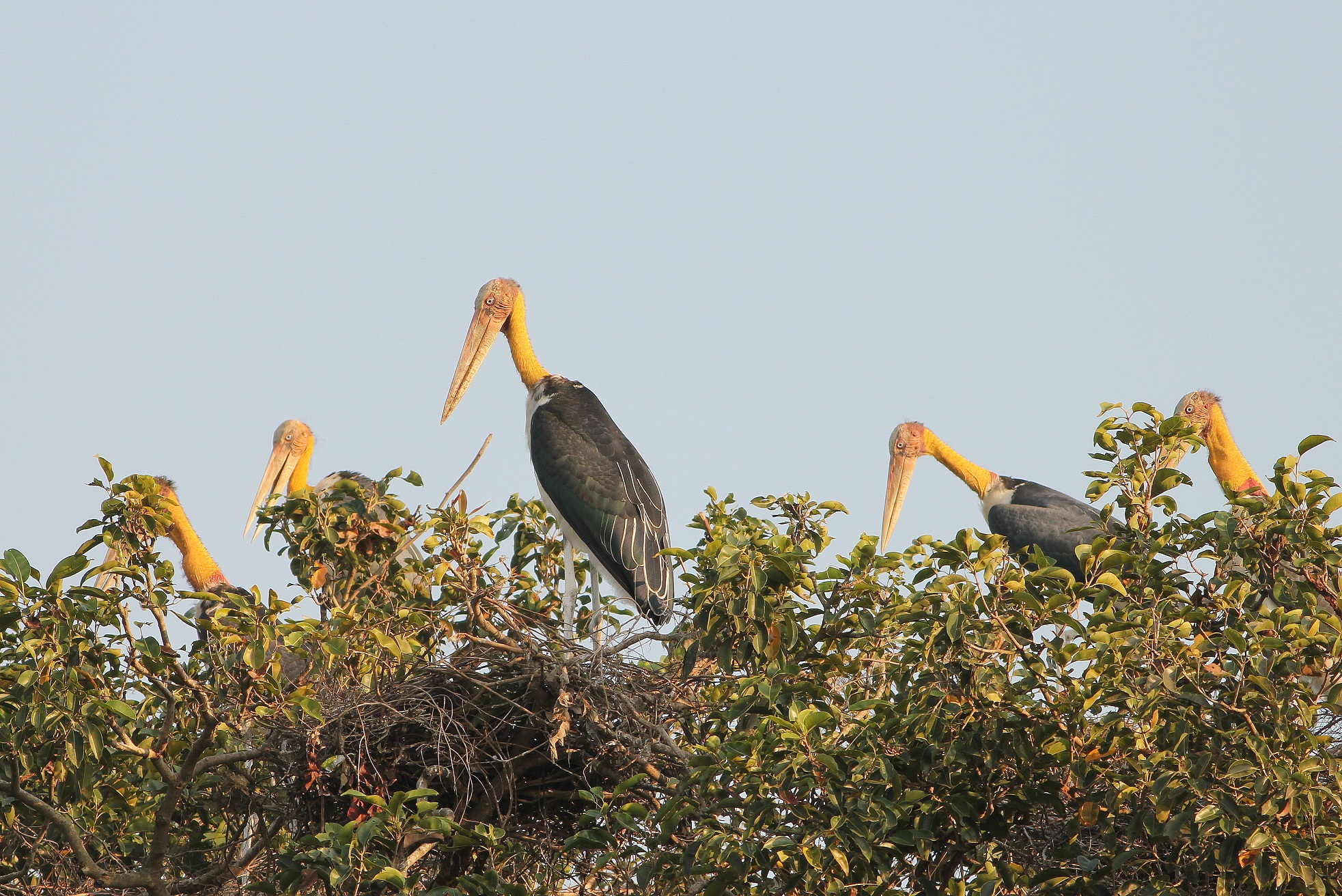
Nesting at Nehra, Darbhanga, Bihar

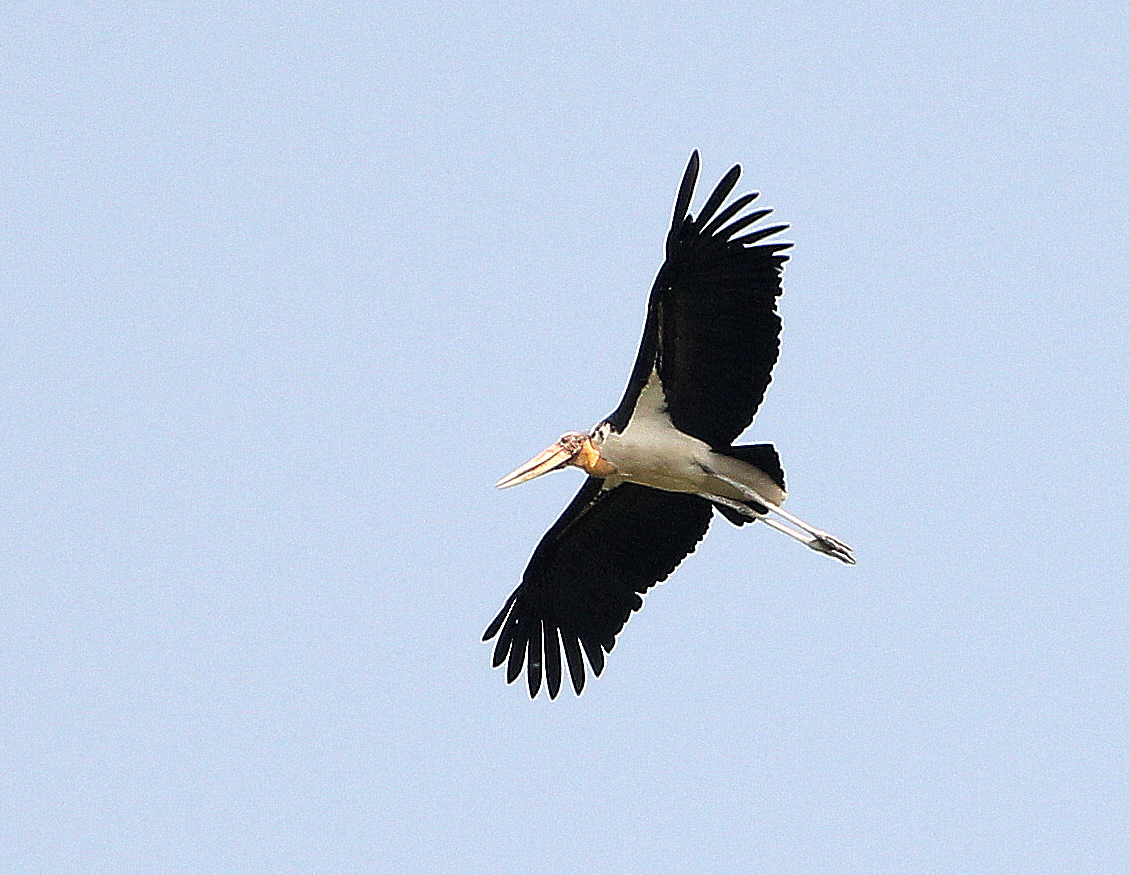
In flight at Nehra, Darbhanga, Bihar

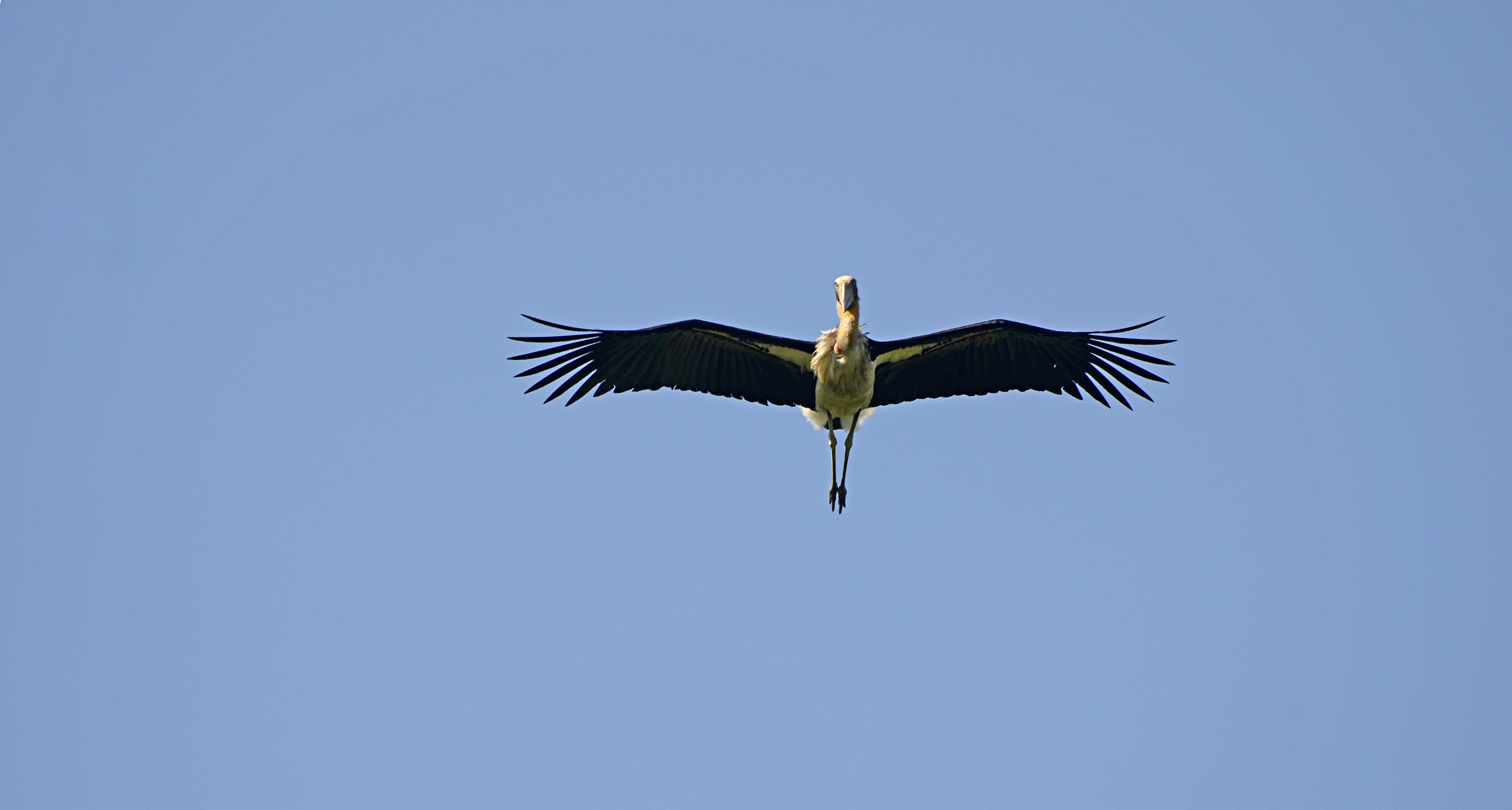
In flight at Dadara, Assam
