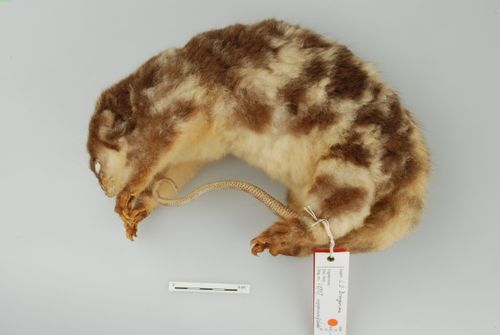

Conservation status
- Critically Endangered (IUCN 3.1)

Scientific classification
- Kingdom: Animalia
- Phylum: Chordata
- Class: Mammalia
- Infraclass: Marsupialia
- Order: Diprotodontia
- Family: Phalangeridae
- Genus: Spilocuscus
- Species: S. wilsoni

Binomial name
- Spilocuscus wilsoni Helgen & Flannery, 2004
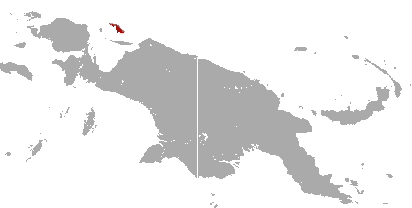
- Blue-eyed spotted cuscus range

= Blue-eyed spotted cuscus =

Species of marsupial

The blue-eyed spotted cuscus or Biak spotted cuscus (Spilocuscus wilsoni) is a species of critically endangered marsupial in the family Phalangeridae.

== Taxonomy ==
The blue-eyed spotted cuscus is one of five species of spotted cuscus in the genus Spilocuscus. The characteristics of species in this genus are sexual dichromatism in fur colour and pattern, sexual dimorphism, small and internally furry ears, vertically slit pupils, and a protruding frontal sinus/forehead.

Spilocuscus
| Species | Geographic Range |
|---|---|
| S. rufoniger | Lowlands, northern New Guinea |
| S. maculatus | Lowlands, northern New Guinea; tropical northeastern Australia |
| S. papuensis | Waigeo and Batanta islands, northwestern New Guinea |
| S. kraemeri | Admiralty island group, northwestern Bismarck Archipelago |
| S. wilsoni | Biak and Suipori islands, northern New Guinea |

Spilocuscus wilsoni is a "distinctive insular species" like the S. papuensis and S. kraemeri, and is endemic to a small island group in Cenderawasih Bay. Blue-eyed spotted cuscus inhabit Biak island, coexisting with the Common Spotted Cuscus (Spilocuscus papuensis). Spilocuscus wilsoni was classified as its own species in 2004 by Kristofer M. Helgen and Timothy F. Flannery.

=== Etymology ===
The species is named for Don E. Wilson, of the Division of Mammals at the United States National Museum of Natural History, mentor of the co-classifier Kristofer M. Helgen.

== Description ==
The blue-eyed spotted cuscus has a pale marbled coat with shades of brown, grey, and white with a creamy white underbelly. Colour, patterns and size differ according to sex and age.This species is relatively smaller in size than the other Spilocuscus cuscuses and has distinct blue-green eyes, not seen in any other species in the genus.

=== Sexual dimorphism ===
Females are larger than males.

== Distribution and habitat ==
The blue-eyed spotted cuscus can be found on several of the islands in the Cenderawasih Bay in West Papua and in Halmahera Island in North Maluku of Indonesia. This region is made up of the islands Biak, Supiori, and Numfor. Despite being endemic to the islands Biak and Supiori, the blue-eyed spotted cuscus have been spotted on the island of Numfor as pets. This cuscus lives in the treetops of the tropical rainforests found throughout Supiori and Biak. Due to the rugged terrain common on the Supiori Island, it is better insulated from human foot traffic and allows for a more flourishing population than that on Biak.

== Conservation ==
The major threats to the blue-eyed spotted cuscus include habitat loss, hunting, and collection for the exotic pet trade by locals. Due to its rarity, the blue-eyed spotted cuscus was only scientifically described in 2004 and was deemed critically endangered by the IUCN in 2015. Recent surveys have failed to find any wild individuals from Numfor and, more recently, Biak. Reasons for the rarity of the blue-eyed spotted cuscus is unknown, especially considering the other species within the genus (S. maculatus and S. kraemeri species) also operate in restricted ranges, yet are still quite common despite hunting and habitat destruction.

Currently, there are no widespread conservation efforts dedicated to protecting this species. However, 12% of its ecoregion (344km^{2}) has been classified as protected between the three islands.
