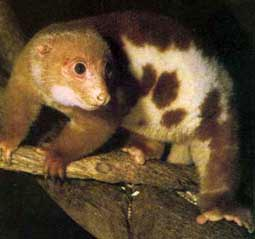
- Common spotted cuscus

Scientific classification
- Domain: Eukaryota
- Kingdom: Animalia
- Phylum: Chordata
- Class: Mammalia
- Infraclass: Marsupialia
- Order: Diprotodontia
- Family: Phalangeridae
- Genus: Spilocuscus; J. E. Gray, 1861

Type species
- Phalangista maculata Desmarest, 1818

Species
- S. kraemeri; S. maculatus; S. papuensis; S. rufoniger; S. wilsoni

= Spilocuscus =

Genus of marsupials

Spilocuscus is a genus of marsupial in the family Phalangeridae. Its members are found on the Cape York Peninsula of Australia, New Guinea, and smaller nearby islands. It contains the following species:

- Admiralty Island cuscus, Spilocuscus kraemeri
- Common spotted cuscus, Spilocuscus maculatus
- Waigeou cuscus, Spilocuscus papuensis
- Black-spotted cuscus, Spilocuscus rufoniger
- Blue-eyed spotted cuscus, Spilocuscus wilsoni
