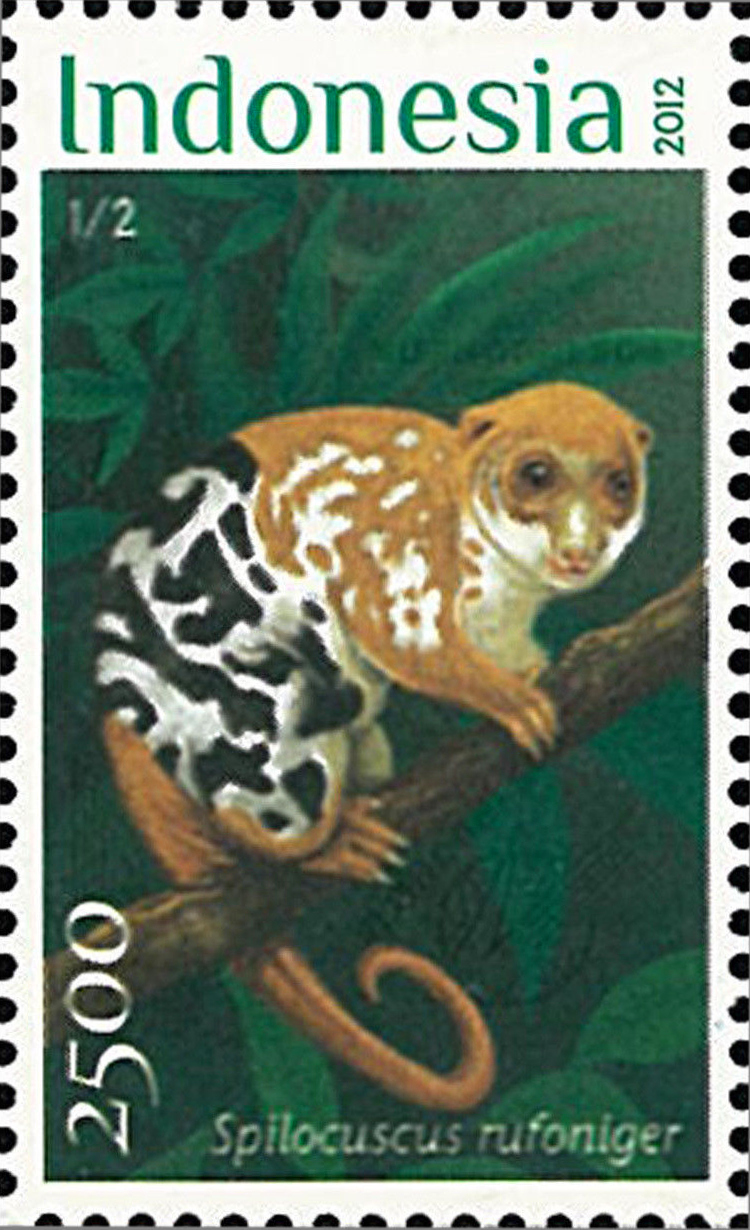

Conservation status
- Critically Endangered (IUCN 3.1)

Scientific classification
- Kingdom: Animalia
- Phylum: Chordata
- Class: Mammalia
- Infraclass: Marsupialia
- Order: Diprotodontia
- Family: Phalangeridae
- Genus: Spilocuscus
- Species: S. rufoniger

Binomial name
- Spilocuscus rufoniger (Zimara, 1937)
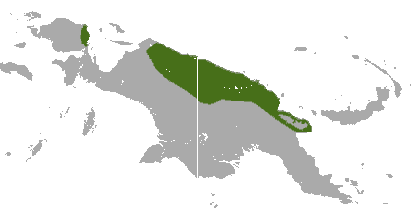
- Black-spotted cuscus range

= Black-spotted cuscus =

Species of marsupial native to New Guinea

The black-spotted cuscus (Spilocuscus rufoniger) is a species of marsupial in the family Phalangeridae. It is among the largest members of the family, only being surpassed by the bear cuscus. It is a relatively colourful species found in forests of northern New Guinea. It is threatened by hunting and habitat loss, and has already disappeared from large parts of its range. Consequently, it is rated as Critically Endangered by IUCN.

== Evolution and history ==
The family Phalangeridae originated from the Australian rainforests by the early Miocene epoch. Since then, cuscuses have successfully diversified from the Phalangerids. Current research has indicated that the Trichosurini (possums) separated from the cuscuses that comprised the extant Phalangerids approximately 23 to 29 million years ago. This split supports the surfacing of Sulawesi and New Guinea. The emergence of these land masses implies that the ancestors of the cuscuses traveled to the New Guinea region that appeared while the Trichosurini stayed in Australia. Shortly after this event, around 19 to 24 million years ago, the cuscuses divided into two groups. The first group consists of Ailurops and Strigocuscus celebensis, and the second consists of Phalanger and Spilocuscus, which currently has five species remaining. Out of these five, three are endangered, with Spilocuscus rufoniger being one of them.

There is a masseteric process present in Spilocuscus rufoniger, which is unique to marsupials. There are also inflated frontal sinuses present in the species, which is thought to be a derived characteristic within the family Phalangeridae. Thus, certain distinct features of the black-spotted cuscuses allow them to be classified them as marsupials in the family Phalangeridae.

== Geographic range and habitat ==
The black-spotted cuscus is indigenous to the island of New Guinea. Although the species is spread throughout northern New Guinea, it has been commonly seen in Sattelberg, a village in the Morobe Province of Papua New Guinea. It dwells in undisturbed lower-montane, tropical, primary forests and lowland areas of thick brushwood below 1200 meters in elevation. Black-spotted cuscuses have been located in secondary forests as well.

== Description ==
Black-spotted cuscuses comprise one of the largest species of the family Phalangeridae; only surpassed in size by the bear cuscus. Adult black-spotted cuscuses weigh approximately 6 to 7 kg (13 to 15 lb) on average. Typically, they are 120 cm in length, with the head and body measuring approximately 70 cm, and the tail measuring 50 cm.

Both adult males and females exhibit red and black fur that is dense and woolly. However, females are bigger and have a uniformly dark, saddle-like coloration, while males have spotty colorations. The pelages of the young transform through a series of colors during maturation. The undersides of black-spotted cuscuses have areas of yellow and white. Females possess four mammae and modified pouches for neonates that open anteriorly.

Black-spotted cuscuses have round heads with a short, pointed snout. The frontal skull bones are convex, which gives them their bulging forehead, and they have a large sinus that is closed off from the nasal cavity. In black-spotted cuscuses, the basioccipital and alisphenoid bones in the skull create a well-developed structure earlier than in other Phalangeridae. Their eyes are characterized by large, vertically split pupils that are useful for their nocturnal lifestyle. There is fur lining the inner ears, which are almost invisible. Black-spotted cuscuses can be distinguished from other cuscuses by their teeth. They have low crowns and small premolars that lie anterior to the primary premolar in the upper jaw. In addition, they have a prominent protocone on their first, upper molars.

They have arched front claws that are pointed acutely for the purpose of climbing. The first two digits on these foreclaws are opposable to the other three digits. The toes of the hind feet have adapted to grasp objects and branches; the opposable big toe has no claws, while the smaller second and third toes are fused together.

Black-spotted cuscuses primarily use their tails for grasping. They are naked at the tip, and the underside of the tails are streaked with calluses for ease of picking up items such as food.

== Behavior ==
Spilocuscus rufoniger are endotherms. The black-spotted cuscuses are primarily arboreal; they only descend to the ground periodically. Being nocturnal creatures, they rest in a curled position on high branches throughout the day. Naturally, they are sluggish creatures with predominantly solitary lifestyles. Feeding and nesting is performed individually. Interactions and encounters between individuals of this species typically involve aggression. There have been no reports of arboreal predators in the habitats of the black-spotted cuscus.

=== Reproduction ===
Little is known regarding the mating behavior of black-spotted cuscuses. Courting is typically performed on tree limbs. Black-spotted cuscuses produce offspring via sexual reproduction. They are viviparous, with the mother birthing live young.

=== Parental care ===
The mother possesses a pouch that functions in nursing and protecting her altricial neonates. Little else is noted in regards to the parental investment and care of the black-spotted cuscus.

=== Diet ===
Little is known about the dietary habits of this species. They are believed to be omnivores that consume small animals. In addition, they feed upon fruits, leaves, nuts.

== Population ==
From 1982 to 1990, the International Union for Conservation of Nature (IUCN) stated that the species was "Rare". This was until its status was changed to "Vulnerable" in 1994 and then to "Endangered" in 1996. According to the IUCN, the black-spotted cuscus has been classified as Critically Endangered since 2010. The population of this species is drastically declining due to human disruptions.

The expansion of human populations has led to the conversion from forestry to cultivated land for agricultural purposes. For instance, there has been an influx of Javan people into Papua New Guinea, which destroys the habitats of the black-spotted cuscuses and contributes to their decline.

Currently, plans for oil palm activities and logging concessions are underway in locations that are home to the black-spotted cuscus. International trade has also inhibited the biodiversity on the island of Papua New Guinea. Papua New Guinea has high exportation rates, which serves as a threat to the species.

The main threat to the black-spotted cuscus is overhunting. Due to its large size in comparison to other marsupials, it is frequently hunted for its meat. In addition, its dense, colorful fur makes it favorable for capes and headwear. The existence of the black-spotted cuscus in a limited environment makes it an easy hunting target.

== Conservation status ==
Currently, there are no existing national parks in Papua New Guinea to protect this species. However, to address the critical endangerment status, a management area has been built in Papua New Guinea, and there are numerous areas in Indonesia that the black-spotted cuscuses can inhabit for protection. To further address the problem, hunting restrictions and public awareness need to be implemented.
