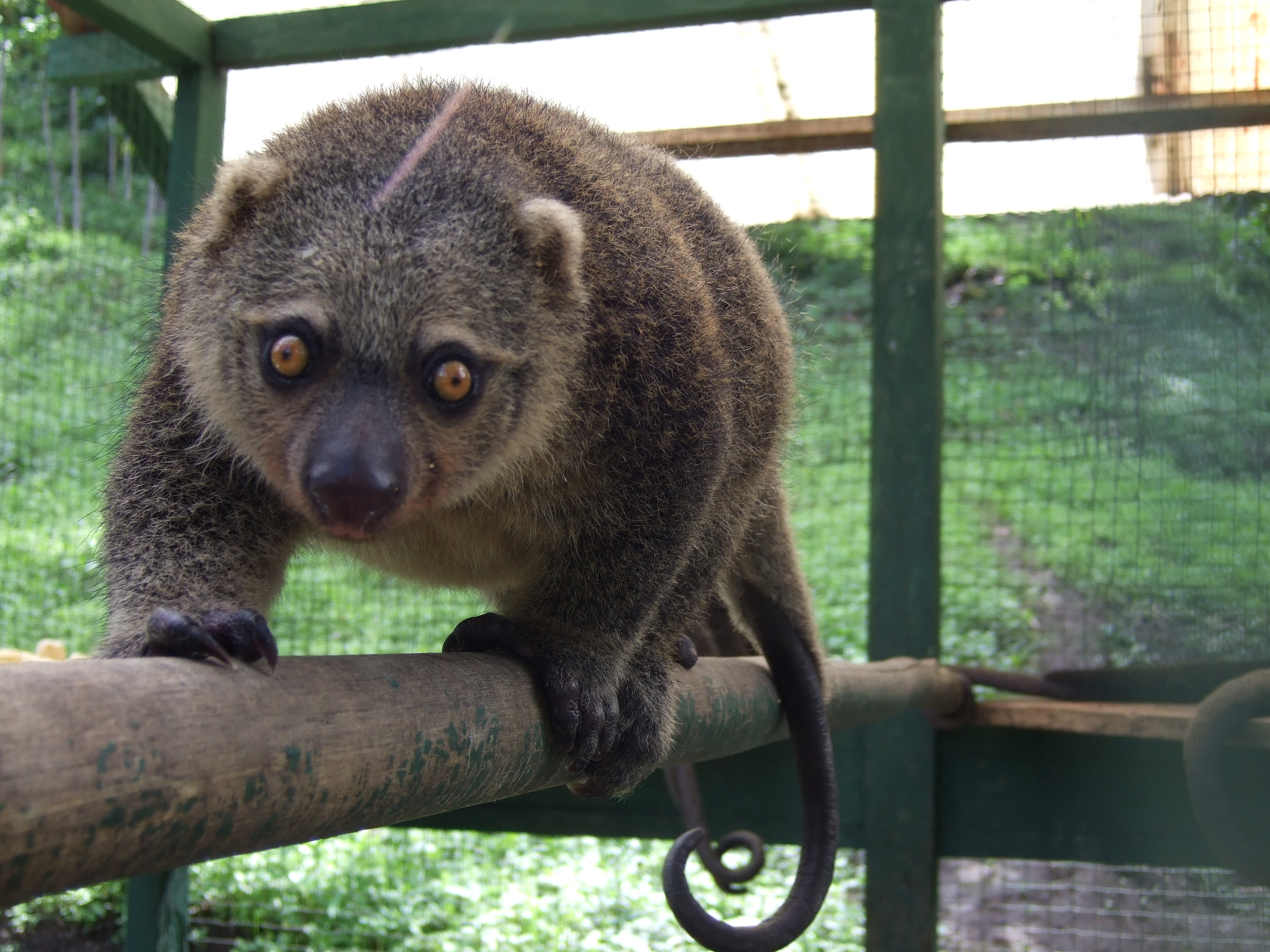

Conservation status
- Vulnerable (IUCN 3.1)

Scientific classification
- Kingdom: Animalia
- Phylum: Chordata
- Class: Mammalia
- Infraclass: Marsupialia
- Order: Diprotodontia
- Family: Phalangeridae
- Genus: Ailurops
- Species: A. ursinus

Binomial name
- Ailurops ursinus (Temminck, 1824)
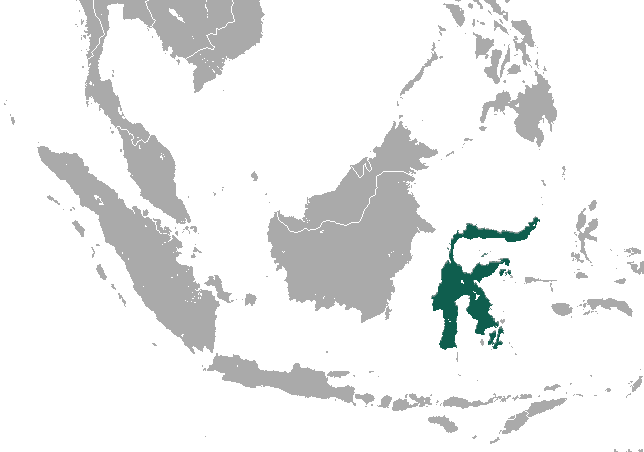
- Sulawesi bear cuscus range

Synonyms
- Phalanger ursinus (Temminck, 1824)

= Sulawesi bear cuscus =

Species of marsupial

The Sulawesi bear cuscus, also known as the Sulawesi bear phalanger (Ailurops ursinus), is a species of arboreal marsupial in the family Phalangeridae that is endemic to Sulawesi and nearby islands in Indonesia. It lives in tropical moist lowland forest at elevations up to 600 m (2,000 ft) and is diurnal, folivorous and often found in pairs. A. ursinus is threatened by hunting, collection for the pet trade and deforestation.

One specimen was observed adopting a raised posture while making short, harsh chattering and clicking sounds.

== Diet ==
Bear cuscuses can feed on the young leaves of up to 31 different species of plants varying from trees, lianas, and mistletoes. Feeding only amounts to about 5% of their daily activity, compared to about 63% spent on resting.

== Vulnerability ==
The lack of legal protection for bear cuscuses, combined with habitat loss and poaching for consumption and illegal trade has caused the species to suffer a decline.

Despite its status and declining population trend, the bear cuscus is not protected by Indonesian law or listed in the CITES appendices, even though it is commonly traded in Sulawesi and abroad. It was previously protected by Indonesian law from 1999 to 2018, even after its reclassification from the name Phalanger ursinus in 1987. However, when the government updated its list of protected species in 2018, only A. melanotis — a bear cuscus species listed as critically endangered by the IUCN and found only on the Talaud and Sangihe islands off North Sulawesi — was included. A. ursinus was not proposed for protection by Indonesia’s scientific authority at the time, LIPI (now BRIN), despite its broad distribution and growing threats to its survival.

The bear cuscus has been illegally hunted for consumption, trade between villages, rearing or pet food. There continues to be consistent demand for bear cuscus meat at bushmeat markets. Stronger action must be taken to combat poaching, including developing alternative economic opportunities for local people, improving awareness and environmental education, and mitigating demand for bushmeat.

Habitat loss from land conversion is also a significant threat to the bear cuscus, particularly as licensed mining operations continue to increase. These operations often employ harmful extractive processes that cause substantial damage to the surrounding ecosystem.

== Gallery ==
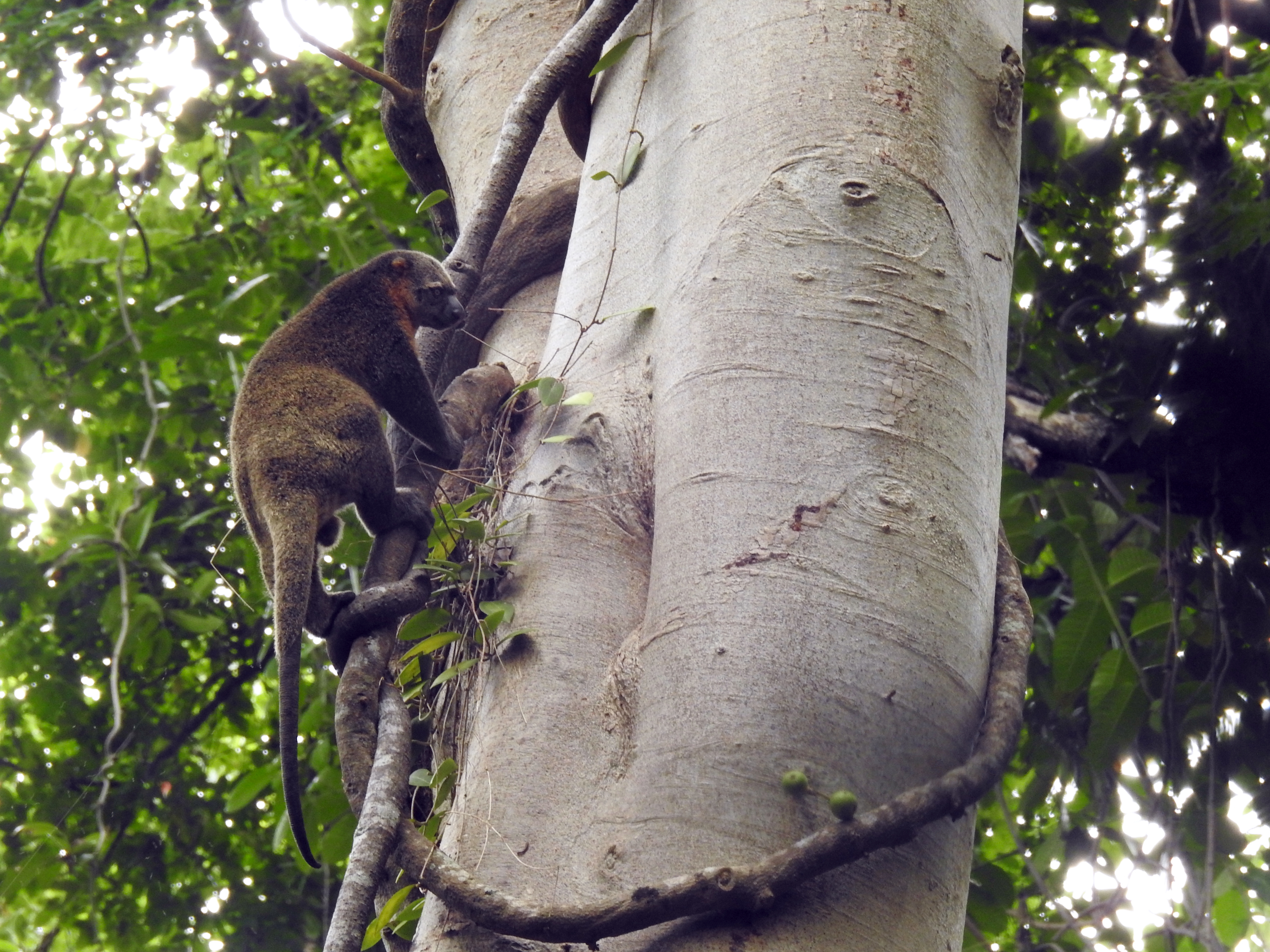
Male in Tangkoko Nature Reserve

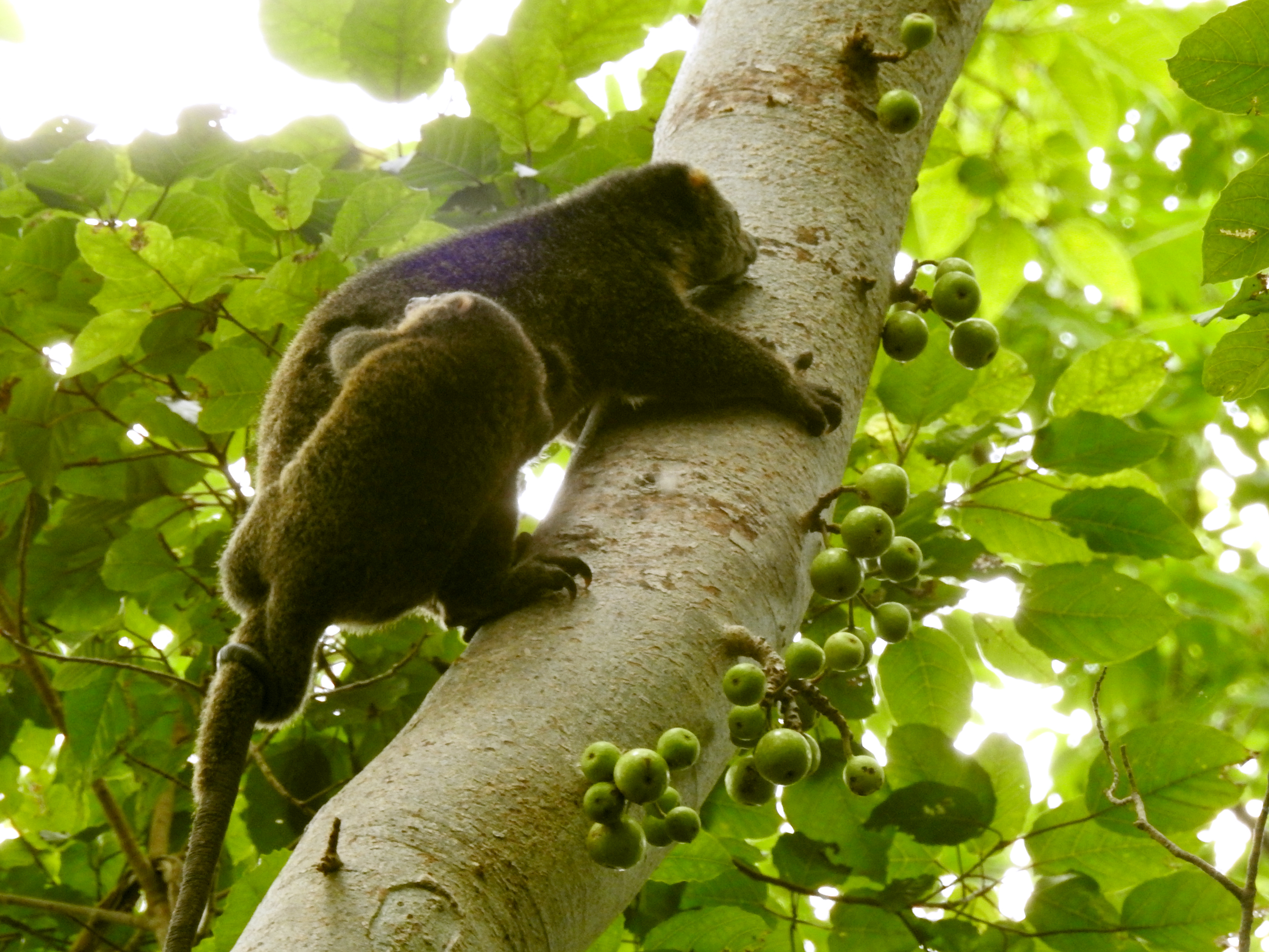
Female and infant on fruiting Ficus tree in Tangkoko

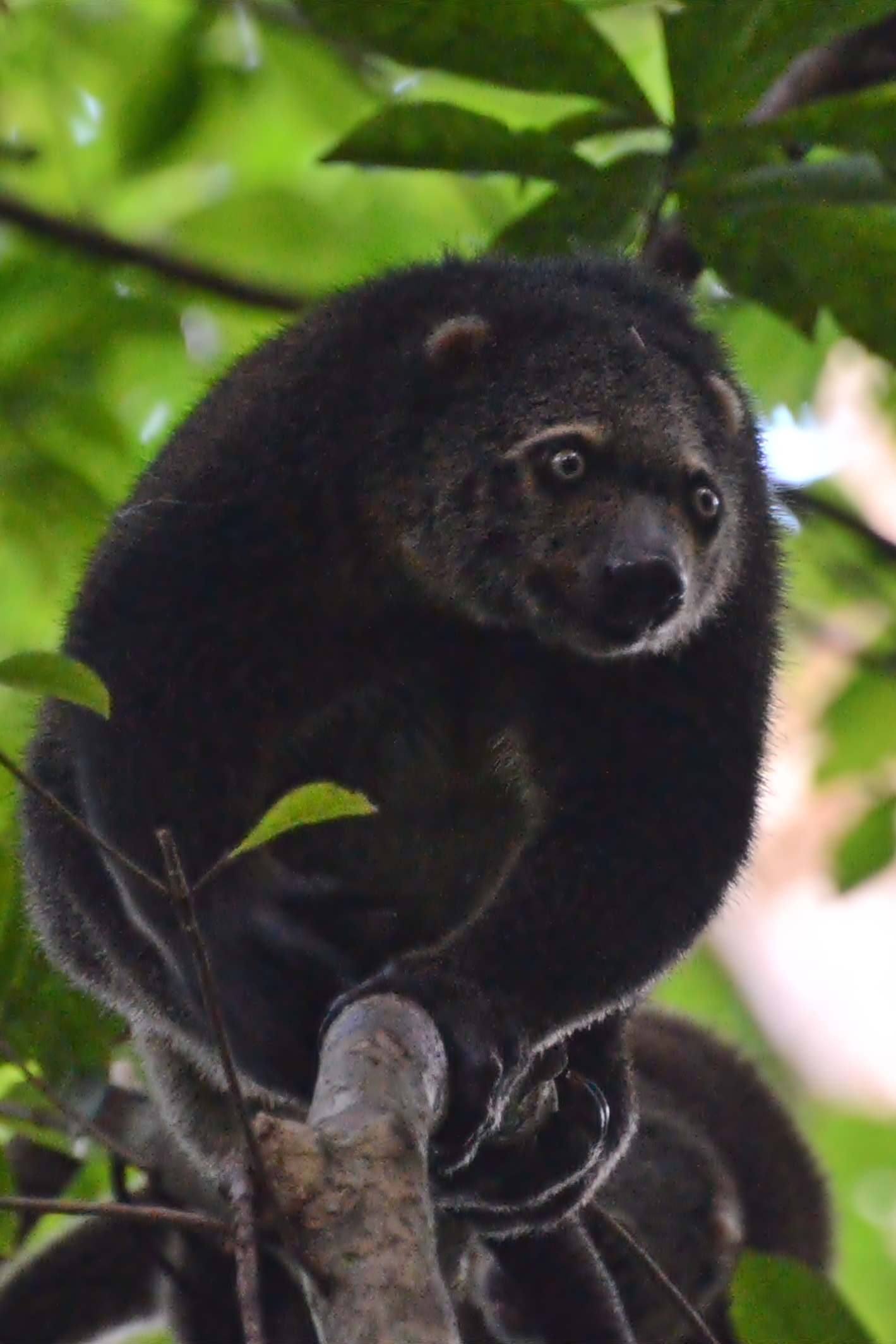
Bear cuscus in Sulawesi

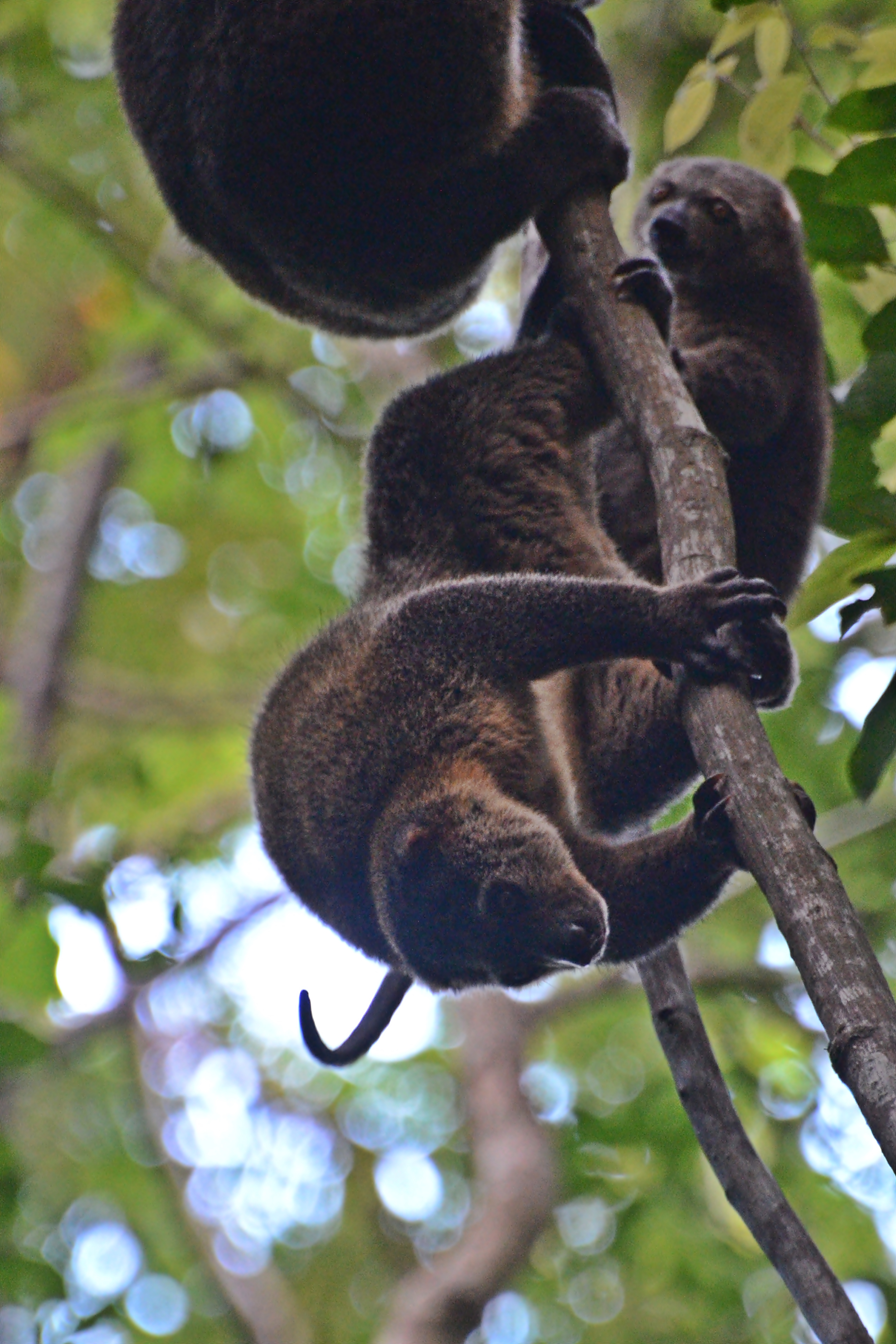
Ailurops ursinus in Tangkoko
