= Admiralty Island cuscus =

Conservation status
- Near Threatened (IUCN 3.1)
- CITES Appendix II (CITES)

Scientific classification
- Kingdom: Animalia
- Phylum: Chordata
- Class: Mammalia
- Infraclass: Marsupialia
- Order: Diprotodontia
- Family: Phalangeridae
- Genus: Spilocuscus
- Species: S. kraemeri

Binomial name
- Spilocuscus kraemeri (Schwartz, 1910)
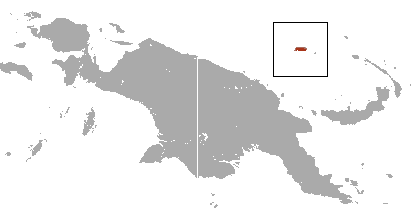
- Admiralty Island cuscus range

Species of marsupial

The Admiralty Island cuscus or Manus Island spotted cuscus (Spilocuscus kraemeri) is a species of marsupial in the family Phalangeridae. It is endemic to the Admiralty Islands of Papua New Guinea. It is the smallest member of the genus Spilocuscus, and the female has a black back, while the male has blackish spots on a white background. Both genders have rufous heads.

Listed as Near Threatened because, although it is common within its small range (its extent of occurrence is less than 2,000 km^{2}), there is continuing decline in both quality of habitat and numbers of individuals, thus making the species close to qualifying for Vulnerable under criterion B. The increasing human population pressures and the low fecundity of this relatively long-lived animal are cause for concern. Populations of this species should be closely monitored.
