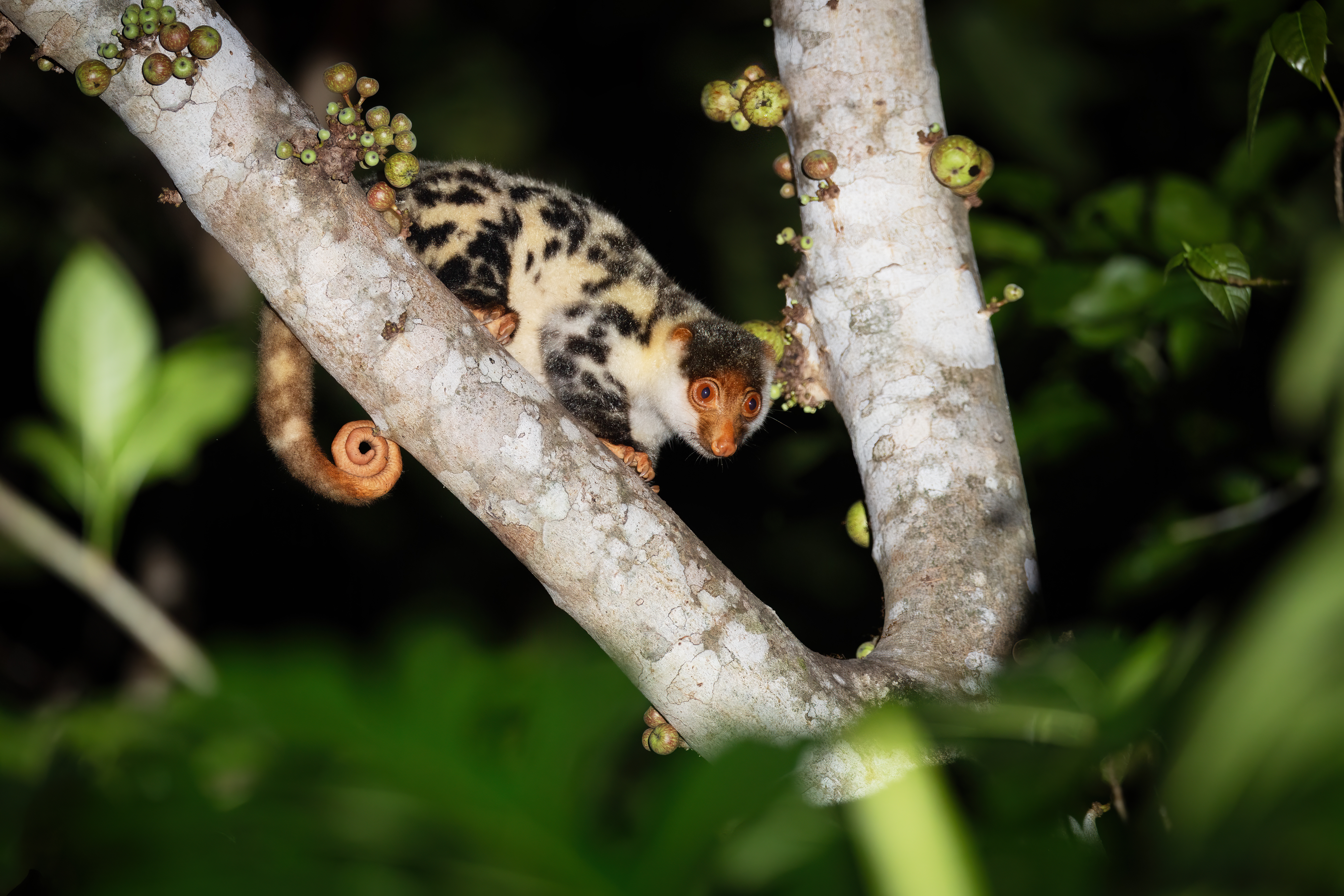

Conservation status
- Vulnerable (IUCN 3.1)
- CITES Appendix II

Scientific classification
- Kingdom: Animalia
- Phylum: Chordata
- Class: Mammalia
- Infraclass: Marsupialia
- Order: Diprotodontia
- Family: Phalangeridae
- Genus: Spilocuscus
- Species: S. papuensis

Binomial name
- Spilocuscus papuensis (Desmarest, 1822)
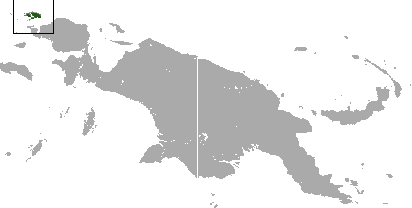
- Waigeou cuscus range

= Waigeou cuscus =

Species of marsupial

The Waigeou cuscus or Waigeou spotted cuscus (Spilocuscus papuensis) is a species of marsupial in the family Phalangeridae. It is endemic to the island of Waigeo in Indonesia, and consequently the spelling Waigeo cuscus is often used instead of Waigeou cuscus. Unlike all other members of the genus Spilocuscus, both sexes are whitish with black spots. It remains fairly common, but its small range makes it vulnerable to habitat loss and hunting.
