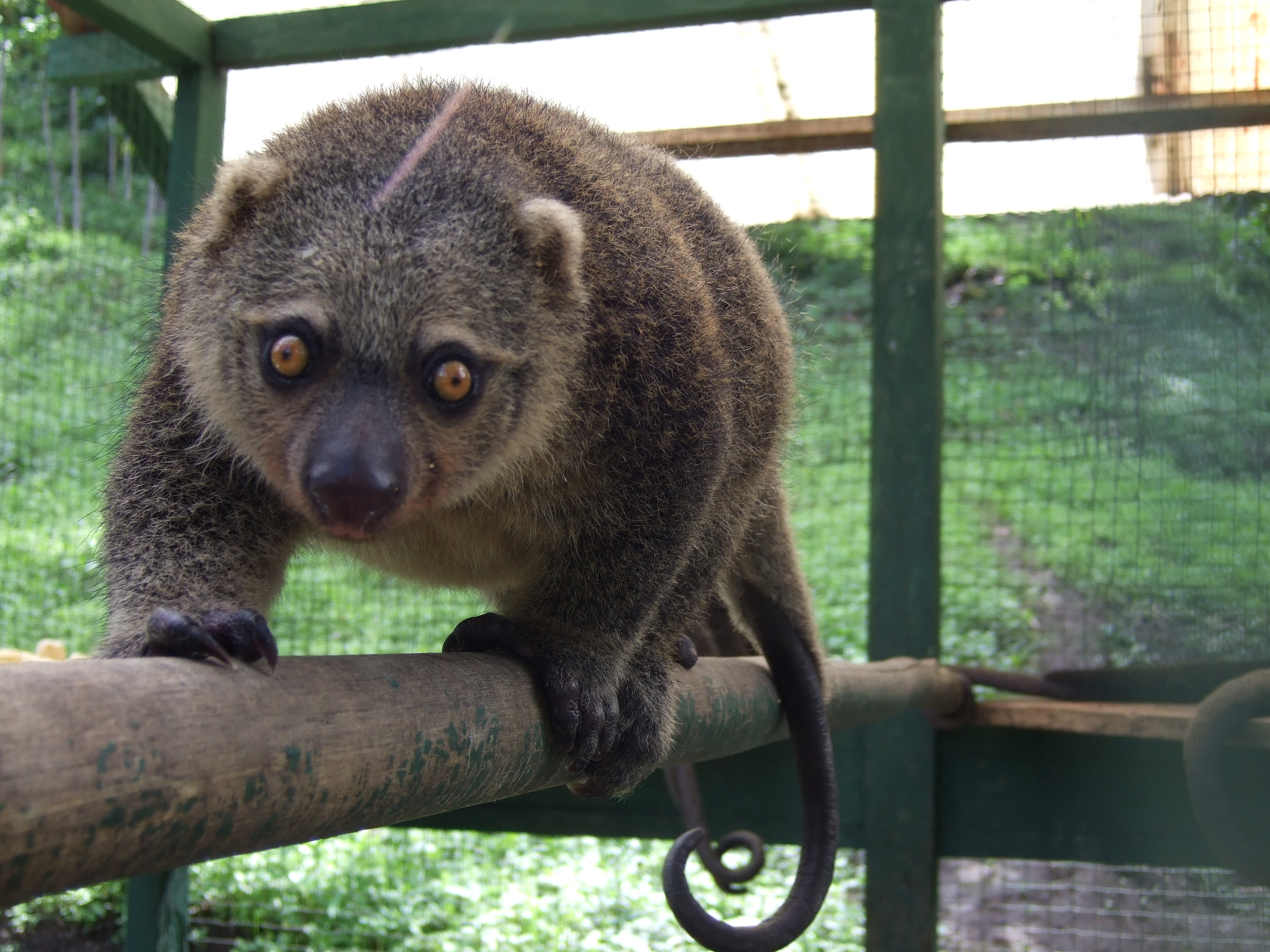
- Sulawesi bear cuscus

Scientific classification
- Kingdom: Animalia
- Phylum: Chordata
- Class: Mammalia
- Infraclass: Marsupialia
- Order: Diprotodontia
- Family: Phalangeridae
- Subfamily: Ailuropinae
- Genus: Ailurops; Wagler, 1830

Type species
- Phalangista ursina Temminck, 1824

Species
- Ailurops melanotis; Ailurops ursinus

= Bear cuscus =

Bear cuscuses

Species of marsupial native to Sulawesi island

The bear cuscuses are the members of the genus Ailurops. They are marsupials of the family Phalangeridae.

The bear cuscuses are arboreal marsupials. Almost nothing is known of their status and ecology. Although some scientists assign all populations to one species, A. ursinus, others place melanotis as its own species. The genus is distinct, though, and some authorities place it within its own subfamily, Ailuropinae.

They are found only in Indonesia on Sulawesi and some smaller nearby islands that are biogeographically part of Wallacea, which from a faunal standpoint is intermediate between the Australian and Indomalayan realms. It is hypothesized that the isolation of the bear cuscuses on the island of Sulawesi in the Miocene accounts for the animal's morphological divergence from the rest of the family Phalangeridae.

The genus contains the following species:

- Talaud bear cuscus, Ailurops melanotis - Salebabu Island in the Talaud Islands
- Sulawesi bear cuscus, Ailurops ursinus - Sulawesi, Peleng Island, Muna Island, Butung Island, Togian Islands
