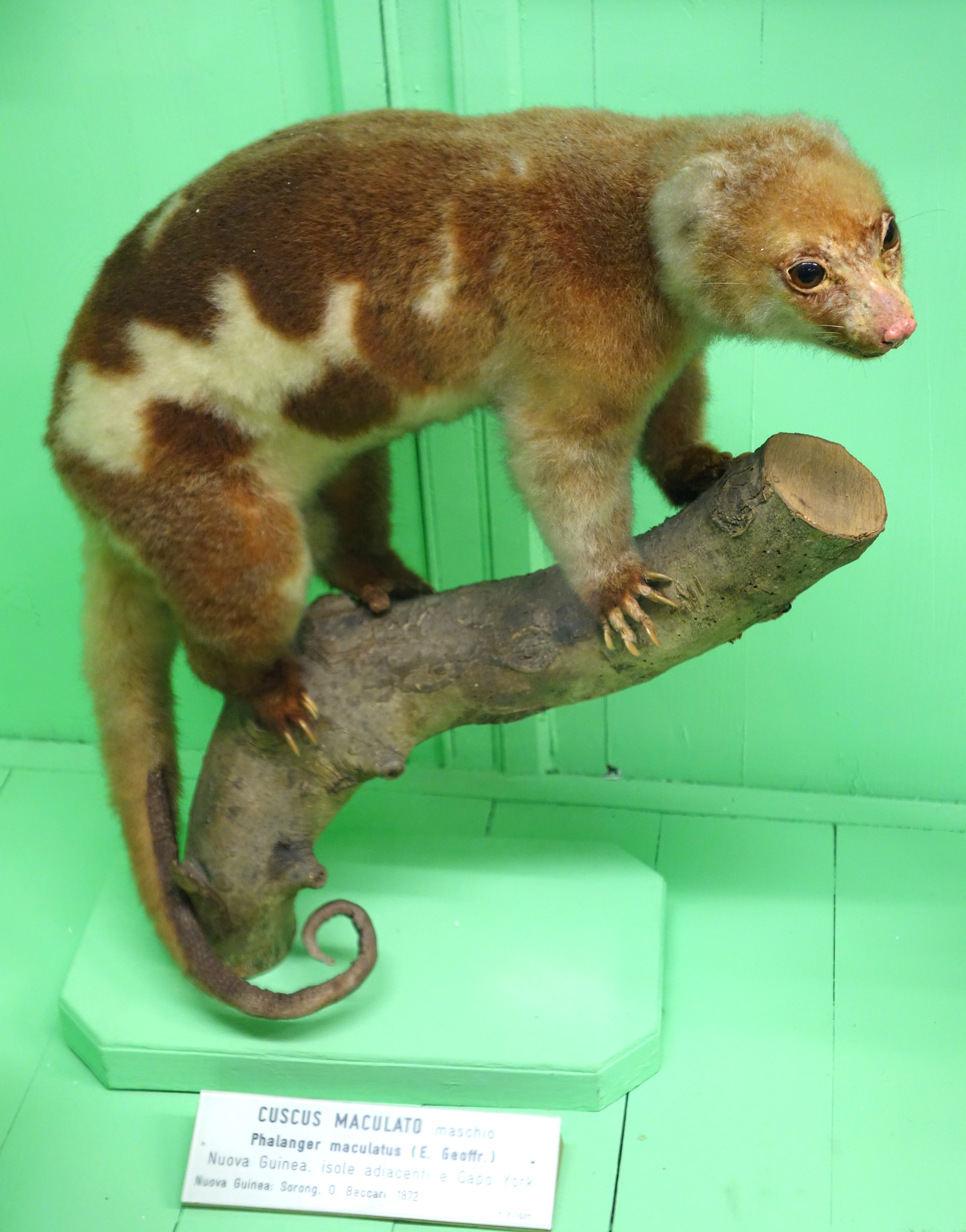
- Spilocuscus maculatus (male)

Conservation status
- Least Concern (IUCN 3.1)
- CITES Appendix II

Scientific classification
- Kingdom: Animalia
- Phylum: Chordata
- Class: Mammalia
- Infraclass: Marsupialia
- Order: Diprotodontia
- Family: Phalangeridae
- Genus: Spilocuscus
- Species: S. maculatus

Binomial name
- Spilocuscus maculatus (E. Geoffroy, 1803)
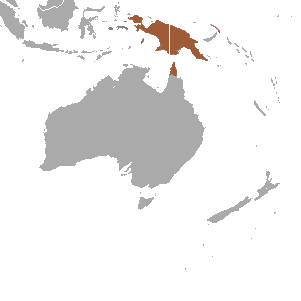
- Common spotted cuscus range (brown — native, red — introduced, dark gray — origin uncertain)

= Common spotted cuscus =

Species of marsupial

The common spotted cuscus (Spilocuscus maculatus), also known as the white cuscus, is a cuscus, a marsupial that lives in the Cape York region of Australia, New Guinea, and nearby smaller islands.

== Names ==
It is known as aklang or gabi in the Kalam language of Papua New Guinea.

== Description ==
The common spotted cuscus is about the size of a common house cat, weighing 1.5 to 6 kilograms (3.3 to 13.2 lb), body size about 35 to 65 centimetres (14 to 26 in) long, and a tail 32 to 60 centimetres (13 to 24 in) long. It has a round head, small hidden ears, thick fur, and a prehensile tail to aid in climbing. Its eyes range in colour from yellows and oranges to reds, and are slit much like a snake's. All four of its limbs have five digits and strong, curved claws, except the first digit on each foot. The second and third digits of the hind foot are partly syndactylous: they are united by skin at the top joint, but divide at the claws. These smaller claws can serve as hair combs when cleaning. The first and second digits of the fore foot are opposable to the other three, helping it grip branches while climbing. The undersides of its paws are bare and striated, which also help it grasp trees and food. The first digit on the hind foot is clawless and opposable.

It has thick, woolly fur of varying colours depending on age, sex, and location. Males are typically grey/white or brown/white with splotchy patterns on their back and a white underbelly. Only males have spots. Females are usually white or grey and unspotted. Some completely white individuals are known in both males and females. As the young grow, they go through a series of color changes before reaching sexual maturity around one year old. Colouration varies from reds and whites to buffs, browns, light greys, and blacks. Unlike some other species of cuscuses or possums, the common spotted cuscus does not have a dorsal stripe on its fur.

The curled, prehensile tail is a distinctive characteristic of the common spotted cuscus. The upper part of the tail closest to the body is covered in fur, while the lower half is covered in rough scales on the inside surface to grip branches.

== Behaviour ==
The common spotted cuscus is typically very shy, so it is rarely seen, especially in northern Australia. It is nocturnal, hunting and feeding at night and sleeping during the day on self-made platforms in tree branches. It also has been found resting in tree hollows, under tree roots, or among rocks. It is slow-moving and somewhat sluggish, sometimes mistaken for sloths, other possums, or even monkeys. Unlike its close relatives, the common spotted cuscus has been observed feeding during the day on rare occasions.

The common spotted cuscus is typically a solitary creature, feeding and nesting alone. Interactions with others, especially between competing males, can be aggressive and confrontational. Male cuscuses scent mark their territory to warn off other males, emitting a penetrating musk odor both from their bodies and scent gland excretions. They distribute saliva on branches and twigs of trees to inform others of their territory and mediate social interactions. If they encounter another male in their area, they make barking, snarling, and hissing noises, and stand upright to defend their territories. They are aggressive, and can scratch, bite, and kick potential predators.

== Mating ==
Cuscuses mate year-round and with multiple partners, conducting courtship on tree limbs. The gestation period for a pregnant female is around 13 days, with a pouch period of 6–7 months. While females have four teats in their pouches and can have up to three young per birth, they rarely suckle more than two. Each young weighs no more than 1 gram at birth, and is held in the mother's well-developed forward-opening pouch. Cuscuses can live to be 11 years old, and reach sexual maturity around one year old.

== Habitat and environment ==
The common spotted cuscus lives in rainforests, mangroves, hardwood and eucalyptus forests below 1,200 metres (3,900 ft); unlike most of its relatives, it is not restricted to rainforest environments. Because it lives in dense wooded habitats, it is not easily seen, especially in Australia.

It is debated whether cuscuses originated in Australia and then migrated to New Guinea, or vice versa. It is believed that over the past million years there have been waves of migration during periods of low sea levels that exposed seabed across the Torres Strait. Currently the common spotted cuscus resides in Cape York, Queensland, in northeastern Australia, as well as New Guinea and nearby smaller islands. It inhabits areas as far west as Sulawesi and as far east as the Solomon Islands.

== Diet ==
The common spotted cuscus has an unspecialised dentition, allowing it to eat a wide variety of plant products. It eats the leaves of ficus, alstonia, and slonea plants, nectar, and the fruits of ficus, lithocarpus, aglia, and possibly mischocarpus and pometia plants. It is also known to eat flowers, small animals, and occasionally eggs. Predators of the common spotted cuscus include pythons, hawks and owls.

== Human interactions ==
The common spotted cuscus is hunted for its meat and pelt in New Guinea, but has very little economical influence. Despite hunting, it is still common in New Guinea and most islands, but it is rarely spotted in Australia, mostly because it is a very shy creature. It was introduced by humans to Selayar, Mussau, and New Ireland, and has since flourished in these areas. The conservation status of the common spotted cuscus is least concern because of its wide population distribution, ability to flourish in a variety of environments, and lack of dominating predators. However, continued human expansion, an increase in demand for cuscus meat and pelts, and destruction of its natural habitat could lead to a demise in the spotted cuscus predominance.
