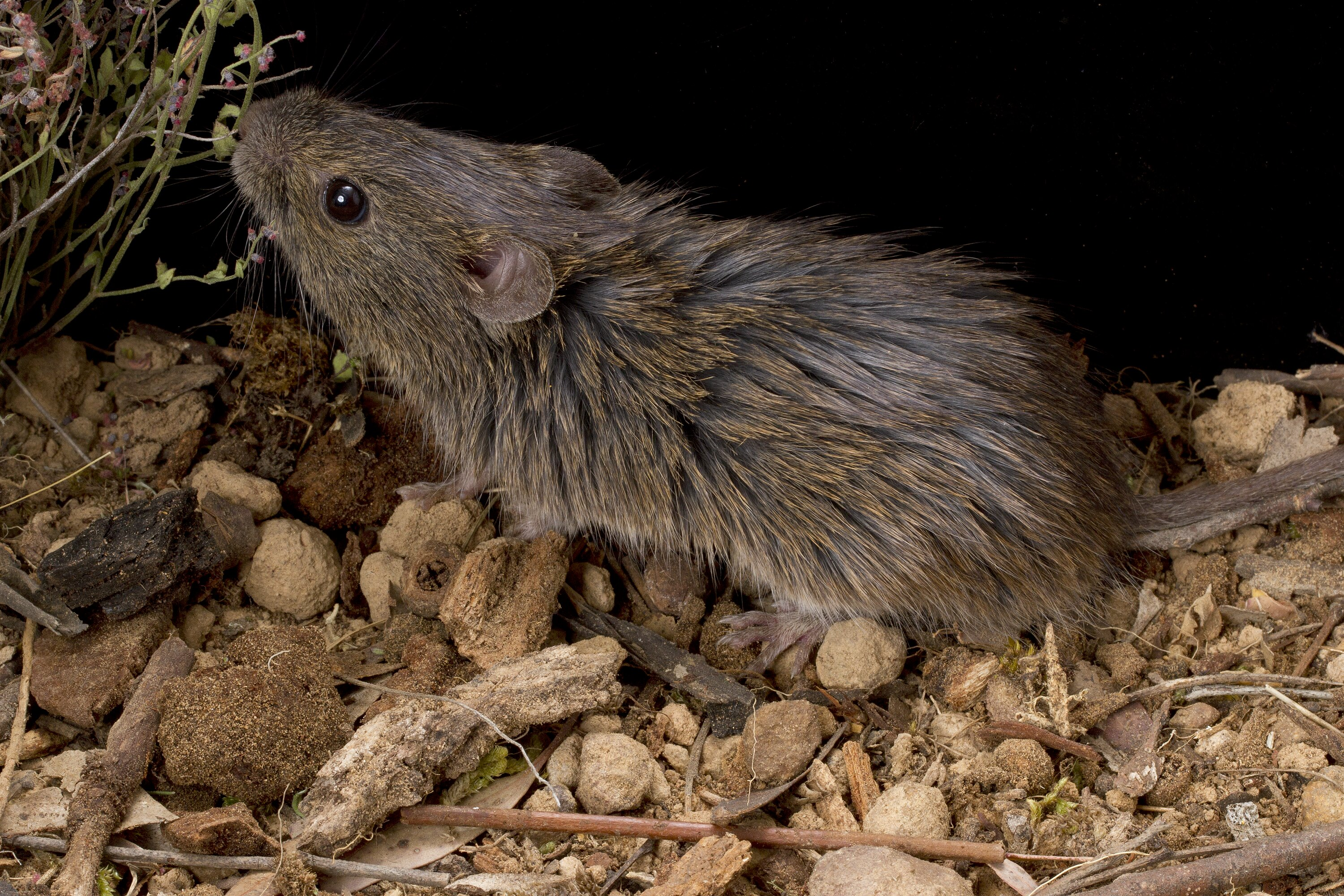

Conservation status
- Near Threatened (IUCN 3.1)

Scientific classification
- Kingdom: Animalia
- Phylum: Chordata
- Class: Mammalia
- Order: Rodentia
- Family: Muridae
- Genus: Pseudomys
- Species: P. shortridgei

Binomial name
- Pseudomys shortridgei (Thomas, 1907)

= Heath mouse =

Species of rodent

The heath mouse (Pseudomys shortridgei) is a species of mouse in the subfamily Murinae, the Old World rats and mice, found in Australia.

== Taxonomy ==
A description of the species, based on material collected by Guy Shortridge at "Woyaline, east of Pinjelly", was published by Oldfield Thomas in 1907.

Shortridge was a South African mammal specialist commissioned to perform fieldwork in Western Australia for the British Museum of Natural History, and was honoured for this by Thomas in the specific epithet of the new taxon.

The species is referred to by the common names heath mouse or heath rat, and by the pre-existing name dayang, derived from the Noongar language. Common names also include blunt-faced rat, Shortridge's native mouse, fausse souris de Shortridge (French), and ratón bastardo crestado (Spanish).

Eastern and western population are not morphologically or phylogenetically distinguishable, although noted for ecological differences that suggests definable groups of the species. The tolerance of the western and southern populations to alterations in fire regimes and frequency may also indicate divergence within the species.

== Description ==
A larger species of the Pseudomys, a genus of Australian rodents, with a body mass in a range from 55 to 90 grams (1.9 to 3.2 oz) for an average weight of 70 grams (2.5 oz). The head and body length of 95 to 120 millimetres (3.7 to 4.7 in) and the tail length of 85 to 100 mm (3.3 to 3.9 in) is always proportionally shorter. The pelage is densely furred and their body is comparatively stocky, the tail is well covered in dark brown hair at the upper side and a whitish colour below. Pseudomys shortridgei have a broad face and short muzzle, and rounded ears that are 14 to 16 mm (0.55 to 0.63 in) from the notch at the head.

The fur colour of Pseudomys shortridgei is warm brown at the upper side, flecked with buff and blackish tones for an overall grey-brown effect. Under-parts of the pelage are distinctly paler, including the marked contrast at lower side of the tail. The regular hair of specimens are a slate colour for most of the length, and tipped with a clay brown tone at the upper quarter of the shaft. Dark guard hairs cover the upper portions of the body and give the heath mouse a fluffy appearance. The hair lengths are 17 mm (0.67 in) for the regular fur, and up to 22 mm (0.87 in) for the guard hairs. The texture of the comparatively long and fine fur, although dense, is soft and loose; the coloration overall has a grizzled or brindled appearance. The colour of the underparts is pale grey, and the upper surface of the feet are covered in long and darker grey hair. This mouse is very similar in appearance to another native mammal, the bush rat Rattus fuscipes, but it can be distinguished from the pink colour of that species feet and tail, which is hairless and scaly, and the elongated shape of a posthallucal pad on the lower surface of the foot.

The face of the heath mouse is blunted in profile, resembling a Roman nose, and possesses bulging eyes, characteristics shared by the majority of the genus Pseudomys. Another common characteristic of Pseudomys, which is also the second morphological character that helps to distinguish the heath mouse from the bush rat, is the hairy tail with distinct bi-colouration; in this species it is dark brown above and light beneath. The muzzle of this species is relatively short. Western and eastern populations show little divergence in characters such as sperm morphology or genetic markers.

The species P. shortridgei is also distinguished by two pairs of teats at the inguinal region.

== Behaviour ==
The species primary diet is herbivorous, consuming the green shoots of grasses when flowers and seeds are out of season, and fungivorous, eating the fruiting bodies of some fungi species. They reside in a nest at ground level or within a shallow burrow. The diet has been termed as generalist, and there is evidence of gut morphology that would favour the consumption of course plant and fungal material. Around one third of the diet is subterranean fruiting bodies, potentially nutritious truffle-like food in the soil. Seeds are a major component of their diet when they are most available, during the earlier part of the austral summer, then shoots and leaves of grasses and other monocot species. They search in soil for food in the seedbank to supplement their diet during winter.

Pseudomys shortridgei is considered semi-nocturnal, usually active in the morning, retiring for the day, and resumes foraging in the later afternoon and evening. The animal is passive and trusting when handled in the field.

== Distribution and habitat ==
The population occurs in two geographically remote regions in the east and west of the continent. The habitat in the east is heathlands and heath-like scrub in treeless areas, the preferred vegetation type in southwest Australia is taller scrubland associated with mallee trees and climax heath assemblages in undisturbed areas. The population structure is responsive to fire, requiring a complex of climax vegetation—that has not been exposed to burning—and recently burnt areas to maintain an equilibrium in their relative abundance. The eastern distribution includes the Grampians region, and the arid open and sclerophyll vegetation of southwest Victoria in an area bounded by Dergholm, Nelson and Mount Clay. A population has been recorded on Kangaroo Island, but its current status is unknown. The western population is represented in isolated locations or conservation areas. including the Fitzgerald River, Lake Magenta and Dragon Rocks national parks and state reserves, and at the Ravensthorpe Range. The western and eastern groups may have become isolated several thousand years ago by a geographic barrier at the Great Australian Bight.

The individual range of P. shortridgei is likely to vary with food availability and other circumstances, recorded as 0.75 hectares in one survey and up to 5 ha in a study using radio tracking. The area inhabited by each individual does not appear to vary with gender or age of the animal. A study of the species population in response to historical and modern practices of fire management was conducted in Victoria in the 1970s, excluding surveys of the western and southern Australian occurrences which were still presumed to be extinct. Alterations to fire management practices and susceptibility of degraded habitat to larger burns is thought to have drastically reduced local populations by increasing the intensity and extent of fire events, replacing historical mosaics of regenerated patches with broad and hot burns that were unsuitable to re-colonisation by this species.

Heath rats were presumed to be totally extinct for a period of thirty years, following Australia's mammalian faunal collapse, and not recorded in surveys after a 1931 collection in southwest Australia. These specimens were supplied to the Western Australian Museum by Joyce Savage of Buniche, after their recent capture by her domestic cats, at a location adjacent to the Harris Nature Reserve in the southeast of the Wheatbelt. The record of living species in the state was previously suspected from evidence in owl droppings, the fragments of several individuals in an old deposit then seemingly fresh bones in a second sample. Many specimens and possibly captures in surveys of other mammals in Western Australia were initially identified or presumed to be Rattus fuscipes, including the 1931 Savage collection received by the state's museum.

The first rediscovery was in Victoria, at The Grampians in 1961 and then in lowland heaths to the south. New records emerged from surveys in Western Australia, where it was rediscovered in 1987, and at Kangaroo Island, off the coast of South Australia, at the start of the twenty first century.

The former distribution of the species, prior to English colonisation, is proposed to have been widespread. Subfossil material is poorly represented at sites in Victoria, but this may be due to misattribution of specimens to the species Pseudomys (Thetomys) gracilicaudatus. Misidentification with native species of rats, Rattus fuscipes and Rattus lutreolus, which they superficially resemble, and this may account for their absence in assessments of a region's mammal fauna, such as the extension of the range from Kangaroo Island to the South Australian mainland. A habitat type favoured by the species at Lake Magenta, particular heath plant communities associated with lateritic soils, was used for aerial photography surveys to successfully predict their occurrence in other localities.

== Conservation ==
Based on an assessment published in 2012 and current in 2016, the IUCN Red List has assigned Pseudomys shortridgei a classification of near threatened, of less concern than the conservations status of vulnerable. They have a low area of occupancy, less than 2,000 km^{2} (770 sq mi), and occurrence at less than ten locations protected by conservation acts. The population trajectory is noted as declining toward extinction, potentially elevating the concern if it continues, and was estimated to be a total of around 11,000 individuals in 2012.

This species is listed as threatened in the states of Victoria, South Australia, and Western Australia. The national status of P. shortridgei (EPBC act, 1999) is vulnerable to extinction. The heath rat was considered to be nationally then regionally extinct during the twentieth century, but rediscovered as fragmented populations at locations in the states listing them as vulnerable.

Pseudomys shortridgei is in a critical weight range of small to medium mammals that succumbed to a mass extinction event during the period 1875 to 1925, the result of one or several threatening factors that caused localised, near or complete extinction. A theory that proposes the primary cause as an epizootic, a novel disease that spread from the Western Australian coast, may be the cause of its apparently large population decline or disappearance; in modelling of the hypothetical disease this species was estimated to have had weak immunity that accounted for its large reduction in range.
