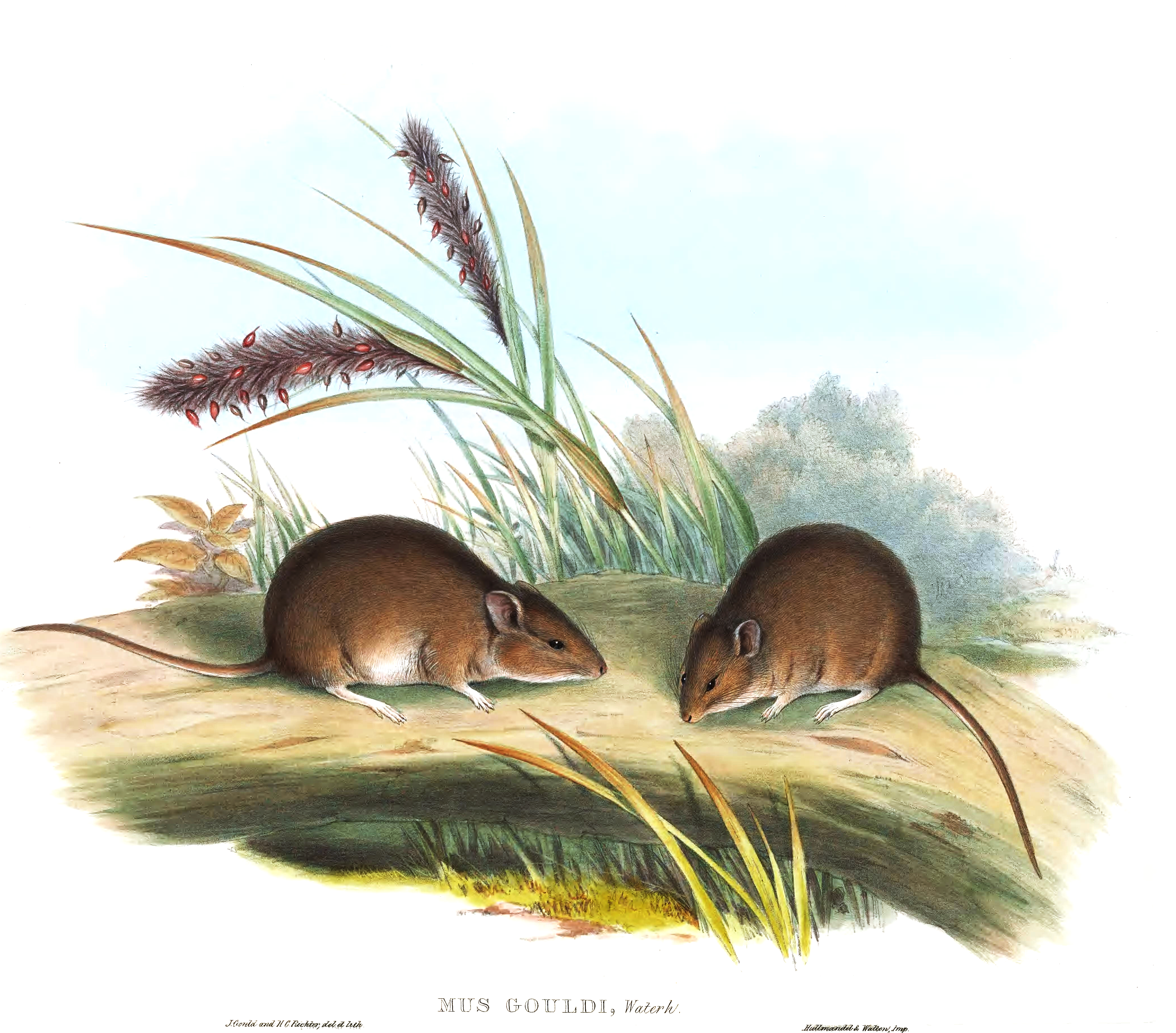
- Illustration by John Gould

Conservation status
- Vulnerable (IUCN 3.1)
- CITES Appendix II

Scientific classification
- Kingdom: Animalia
- Phylum: Chordata
- Class: Mammalia
- Order: Rodentia
- Family: Muridae
- Genus: Pseudomys
- Species: P. gouldii

Binomial name
- Pseudomys gouldii (Waterhouse, 1839)

Synonyms
- Mus gouldii Waterhouse, 1839; Pseudomys rawlinnae Troughton, 1932

= Gould's mouse =

Species of rodent

Gould's mouse (Pseudomys gouldii), also known as the Shark Bay mouse and djoongari in the Pintupi and Luritja languages, is a species of rodent in the murid family. Once ranging throughout Australia from Western Australia to New South Wales, its range has since been reduced to five islands off the coast of Western Australia.

== Taxonomy ==
In 2021, a comprehensive genetic analysis of native Australian rodents found the djoongari or Shark Bay mouse (P. fieldi), which survives on several islands off the coast of Western Australia, to be conspecific with the Gould's mouse. This would make the Gould's mouse, formerly thought extinct, extant once again, albeit only surviving on several islands, a fraction of its former range. The study is based on earlier work by Emily Roycroft for a PhD thesis. It has been proposed that the P. gouldii be retained for the merged species as P. gouldii was described first, but the species' common name be changed to djoongari or Shark Bay mouse.

== Description ==
A large species of Pseudomys, an Australian genus of rodents, with long and shaggy fur. The coloration of the upper parts of djoongari is a pale yellowish fawn interspersed with darker brown guard hairs. The size of the head and body combined ranges from 90 to 115 mm (3.5 to 4.5 in), the tail is a slightly greater length of 115 to 125 mm (4.5 to 4.9 in). Djoongari have an average mass of 45 g (1.6 oz), and may range from 30 to 50 g (1.1 to 1.8 oz). The greyish ears are 19 mm (0.75 in) from the notch to tip. The underside of the pelage is whitish, becoming a buff colour as it grades into the upper parts, the feet are also whitish. The hind foot is 26 to 27 mm (1.0 to 1.1 in) long. The upper surface of the tail is greyish, and distinctly contrasts the lighter coloured lower surface. The tail ends with a tuft of dark fur. Pseudomys gouldii possess two pairs of inguinal teats.

== Discovery ==
As Pseudomys fieldii, the species was described in a description published by Edgar Ravenswood Waite in 1896, the holotype was obtained at Alice Springs; the author allied the new species to the genus Mus. Another description was provided in 1910 by the mammalogist Oldfield Thomas, a new species named as Pseudomys (Thetomys) praeconis. Thomas described a specimen that was obtained at Shark Bay, where the collector Guy C. Shortridge found the dry skull of a female lying on the ground on Bernier Island at the Peron Peninsula; Shortridge reported that he thought the species was locally extinct. Another specimen held at the British Museum, an old female obtained by F. M. Rayner during the voyage of HMS Herald in 1858, was designated as the holotype. The specific epithet was nominated by Waite to fulfil a request of Walter Baldwin Spencer that J. Field be acknowledged for their collection of specimens during the Horn expedition.

== Range ==
It was once found throughout the entire Australian continent, from Western Australia eastwards to New South Wales. but suffered greatly after the arrival of Europeans and feral animals, and eventually its range became reduced to coastal sand dunes on Bernier Island, leaving it severely endangered.

In 2003 the Australian Wildlife Conservancy (AWC) released some Shark Bay mice onto Faure Island in the hope of creating another population. Despite the presence of owls the reintroduction was successful and the population quickly grew to a larger size than that of Bernier Island, no longer leaving the species on the brink of extinction.

The species was reintroduced to Dirk Hartog Island in April 2021, with specimens gathered from another reintroduced population on Western Australia's North West Island.

Fossil evidence expanded the known range of Pseudomys praeconis from the Shark Bay area to areas along the western coast of Australia (Archer and Baynes 1973 and Baynes 1982 cited in Baynes 1990, p. 317), and further inland into the arid zones (Baynes 1984 cited in Baynes 1990, p. 318). It was realised, as the range was further extended by fossil remains, the remains of Pseudomys fieldi represented the easterly bound of the one species (Baynes 1990, 318).

== Behaviour ==
Pseudomys gouldii is slightly smaller than a black rat, and quite social, living in small family groups of 4–8 that shelter by day in a nest of soft, dry grass in a burrow. It usually digs burrows at a depth of 15 centimetres (5.9 in) under bushes.

== Status ==
Gould's mouse was common and widespread before European settlement, but disappeared rapidly after the 1840s, perhaps being exterminated by feral cats. Alternatively, it may have been out-competed by the introduced rats and mice, succumbed to introduced diseases or been affected by grazing stock and changed fire regimes. Despite extensive survey work in its known range, the last specimens were collected in 1856–57, and it was declared officially extinct in 1990 by the IUCN, having been last collected in 1856–1857 by John Gilbert for John Gould, and not sighted since despite several surveys of the area. However, a 2021 genetic study found that it survived on small islands off the coast of Western Australia, in populations which were formerly thought to be their own species known as djoongari. The djoongari is presently classified as Vulnerable on the IUCN Red List.
