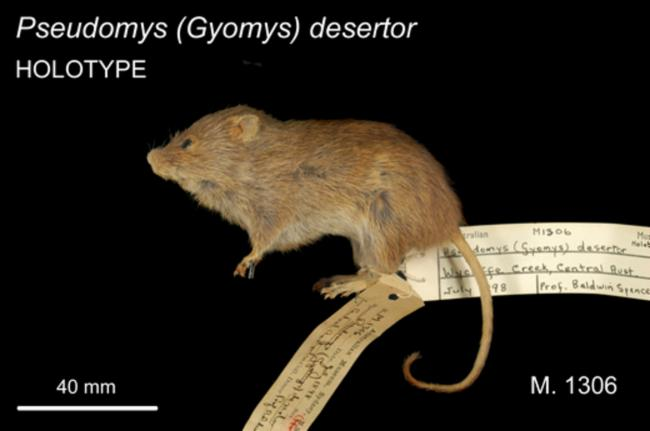
- Pseudomys desertor specimen. Type: holotype. Australian Museum.

Conservation status
- Least Concern (IUCN 3.1)

Scientific classification
- Kingdom: Animalia
- Phylum: Chordata
- Class: Mammalia
- Order: Rodentia
- Family: Muridae
- Genus: Pseudomys
- Species: P. desertor

Binomial name
- Pseudomys desertor (Troughton, 1932)
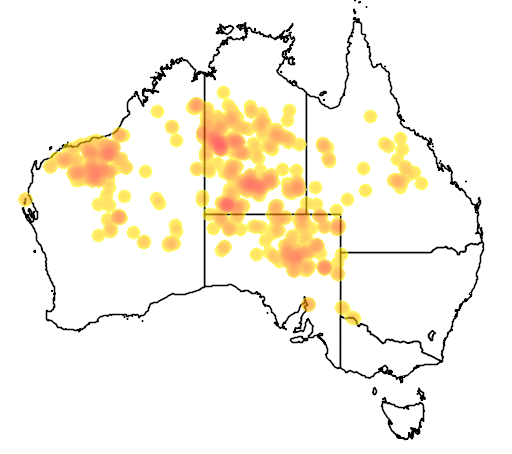
- Pseudomys desertor occurrence records

= Desert mouse =

Species of rodent

The desert mouse (Pseudomys desertor), also known as the brown desert mouse, is a species of rodent in the family Muridae. It is endemic to Australia. The first desert mouse specimen was collected by Australian zoologist Gerard Krefft on the Blandowski Expedition in 1856-57, between Gol Gol Creek and the Darling River.

== Description ==
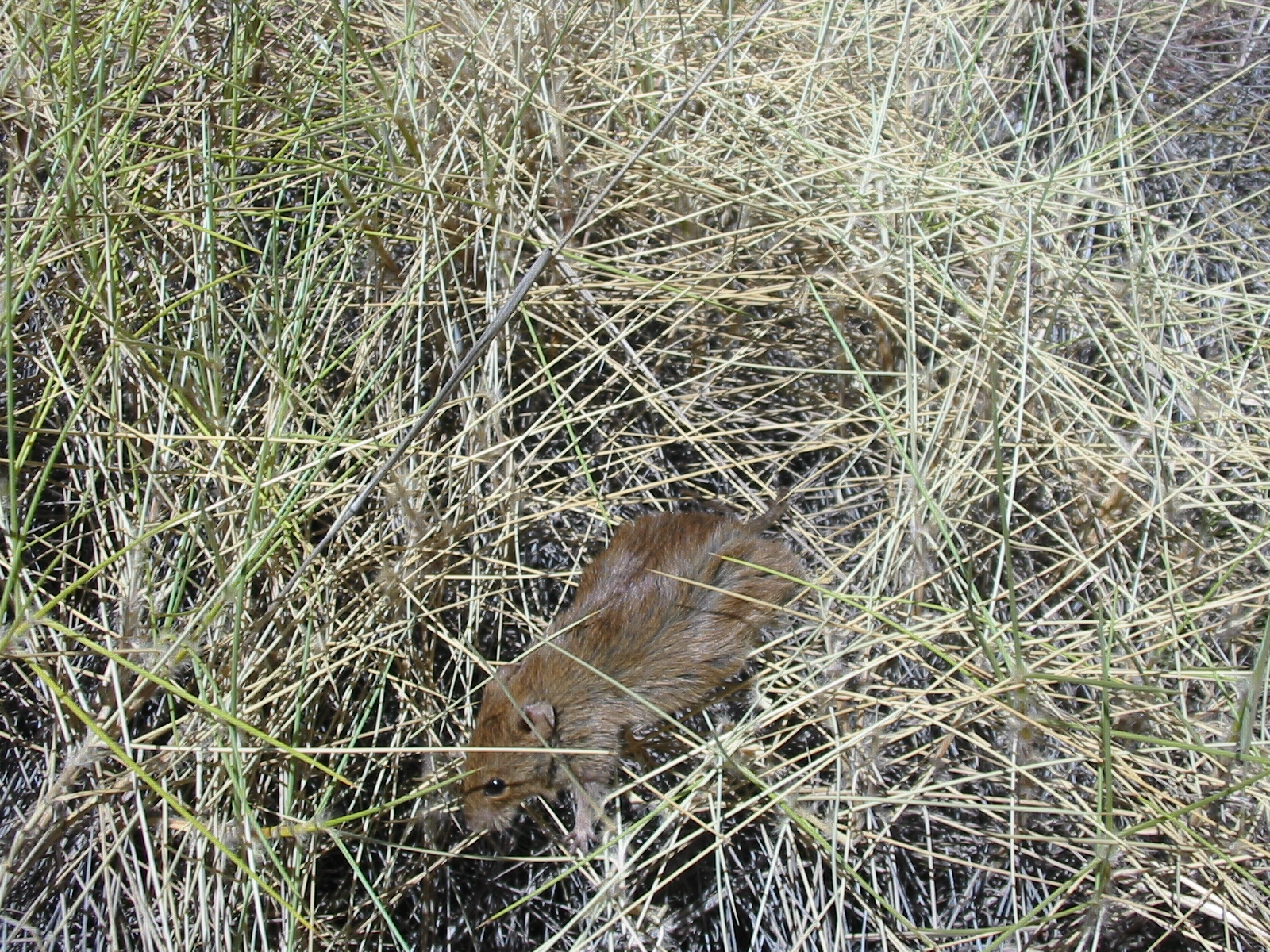
Desert mouse at Purnululu (Bungle Bungle) National Park, Kimberley, WA.

The desert mouse has bright chestnut brown fur above, interspersed with long dark guard hairs which give it a spiny appearance. Its belly fur is a light grey-brown. The tail looks scaly and slightly bi-coloured, with length equal to or shorter than the animal's head-body length. A defining feature of the desert mouse is its pale orange eye-ring, which may be used to distinguish it from the Western chestnut mouse Pseudomys nanus where their habitat overlaps in the northern Tanami Desert.

Typical measurements for the desert mouse are 70–105 mm for head-body length, and 67–103 mm for tail length. Weight is between 15-35 g.

== Distribution and habitat ==
Widespread throughout the arid zone of Australia, the desert mouse also inhabits in the north dry savannah region of Queensland. Its preferred habitat ranges from sand dunes with spinifex to rocky hillsides, which it uses to create shallow burrows.

Fossilized remains of the desert mouse have been found from Cape Range National Park and the Nullarbor Plain in Western Australia, to the northern Flinders Ranges of South Australia, and Lake Victoria in New South Wales. When combined with modern records, these fossil records suggest that the species once had an even more extensive range across arid Australia.

== Behaviour ==
=== Diet ===
Predominantly a folivore, the desert mouse has also been known to eat seeds and invertebrates when leaves and shoots are less widely available. Laboratory studies of the desert mouse have found its water requirements to be quite low.

=== Reproduction ===
The reproduction rate of the desert mouse is very high, even when compared with other species in the Pseudomys genus. This allows populations to increase rapidly after periods of suitable rainfall. Females are sexually receptive and fertile in a 7-9 day cycle. The gestation period lasts 27–28 days, with an average litter size of three pups who will themselves become reproductively mature at about ten weeks.

== Threats ==
The desert mouse appears to be less common in areas affected by fire or grazing. Other threats are posed by introduced species, such as predation by foxes and feral cats, competition from other herbivores like the house mouse (Mus musculus), and habitat alteration by exotic grasses in Queensland.
