= Western delicate mouse =

- Western delicate mouse (Pseudomys pilbarensis) in its natural sandy habitat

Scientific classification
- Kingdom: Animalia
- Phylum: Chordata
- Class: Mammalia
- Order: Rodentia
- Family: Muridae
- Genus: Pseudomys
- Species: P. pilbarensis

Binomial name
- Pseudomys pilbarensis Roycroft, Ford, Ramm, Schembri, Breed, Burns, Rowe & Moritz, 2024

Species of rodent

The western delicate mouse (Pseudomys pilbarensis), also known as the Pilbara delicate mouse or Kalunyja in the Kariyarra language, is a species of rodent native to Australia in the family Muridae. The species occurs in the Pilbara, Great Sandy Desert, and south-eastern Kimberley regions of Western Australia.

== Taxonomy ==
The western delicate mouse, along with the northern delicate mouse (Pseudomys delicatulus) and the eastern delicate mouse (Pseudomys mimulus), was originally described as a single species: the delicate mouse (also called the little native mouse). In 2024, a genomic study led by Dr. Emily Roycroft found that the delicate mouse consisted of three different, morphologically similar species.

== Description ==
The western delicate mouse is a diminutive rodent weighing from 6 to 15 grams (0.21 to 0.53 oz) native to Australia with soft yellow to grey brown fur and a distinctly bicolored tail that is dark brown on top and a lighter grey brown underneath. Measuring 55 to 75 millimetres (2.2 to 3.0 in) in head body length, this nocturnal species possesses large prominent eyes and its tail measures 55 to 80 millimetres (2.2 to 3.1 in) which is equal to or slightly longer than its body. The fur on its underbelly is white or cream, and its rounded ears measure 10 to 12 millimetres (0.39 to 0.47 in) long.

== Habitat ==
The western delicate mouse lives in arid and tropical climates, showing a strong preference for habitats with deep sandy soils. These environments are essential to its burrowing habits. Within these landscapes, the species can typically be found in open areas including spinifex grasslands and low acacia shrubs. In addition to digging tunnels in the sand, the species adapts to its environment by utilising other natural shelters for daytime safety. It frequently hides inside hollow logs, beneath tree bark, or in termite mounds.

== Diet ==
The western delicate mouse feeds primarily on native grass seeds. In addition to its primary consumption of seeds, the species eats green vegetation, plant matter, and roots. It also supplements its diet with small insects and other invertebrates when they are available.
