= Pseudomys vandycki =

Pseudomys vandycki Temporal range: Early Pliocene - Recent

Scientific classification
- Kingdom: Animalia
- Phylum: Chordata
- Class: Mammalia
- Infraclass: Placentalia
- Order: Rodentia
- Family: Muridae
- Genus: Pseudomys
- Species: P. vandycki

Binomial name
- Pseudomys vandycki Godthelp, 1990

Species of rodent

Pseudomys vandycki is a species of the murid family, mice and rats, that is known from fossils discovered in Queensland, Australia.

== Taxonomy ==
Pseudomys vandycki was described in 1990 by Henk Godthelp. The author assigned the specific epithet vandycki in honour of Stephen Van Dyke of the Queensland Museum, acknowledging his contributions to the understanding of mammalian systematics in Australia. The holotype is an incomplete jaw retaining the first and second molar, discovered at the Chinchilla Rifle Range site in 1983.

The species is allied to the Mesembriomys-group, but the phylogeny and biogeographic history of Australasian murids is subject to ongoing research.

== Description ==
Pseudomys vandycki is a medium-sized species of the genus, similar in size and dentition to the ash-grey mouse Pseudomys albocinereus found in Southwest Australia. The morphology of the first molar's crown is characteristic to the species, the first cusp is rectangular and nearly perpendicular to the second and third cusp.

Contemporary species of Pseudomys are unspecialised foragers, eating a variety of plants and fungi with invertebrates often included in the diet.

The rodents' success in other parts of the world is well represented in the diversity of Australian mammal fauna, however, this species and Zyzomys rackhami are the only fossils of the murid family to be discovered and described.

== Distribution and habitat ==
The site of discovery was the Chinchilla fossil site, located in the southeast of Queensland, and the species is only known at this location. The deposit was uncovered in sandstone associated with rivers and lakes and dated to the late Pliocene epoch. Pseudomys vandycki is regarded as an "old endemic" mammal of Australia, part of an early radiation of the rodents into the continent that represented the only terrestrial placental mammals to colonise Australia during the tertiary period. The Chinchilla area was open forest in the Pliocene, with an increasingly warm and seasonally variable climate. The dominant vegetation was eucalyptus woodlands that were displaced by grassland as the climate of the region became warmer and drier.
