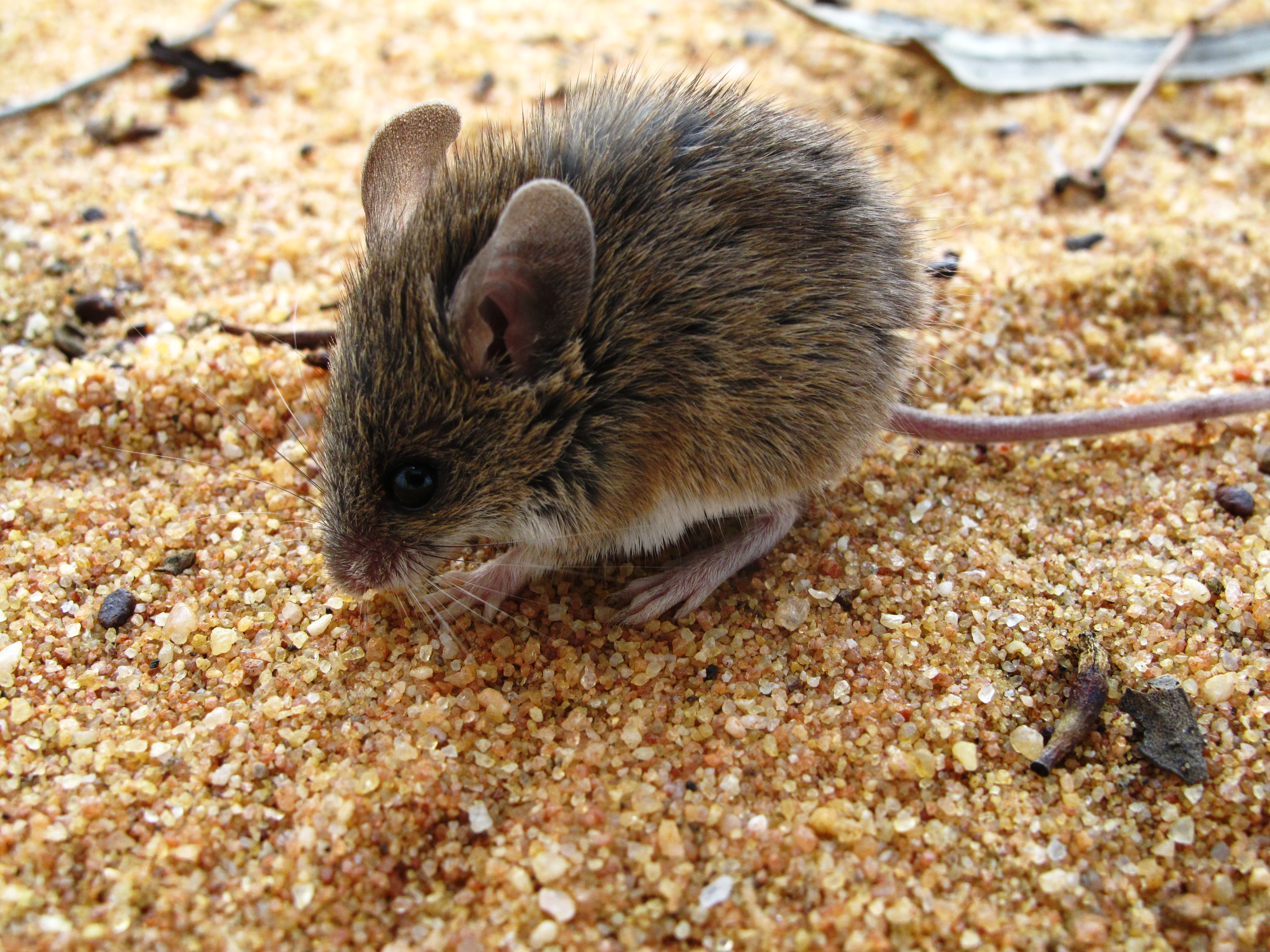

Conservation status
- Data Deficient (IUCN 3.1)

Scientific classification
- Kingdom: Animalia
- Phylum: Chordata
- Class: Mammalia
- Order: Rodentia
- Family: Muridae
- Genus: Pseudomys
- Species: P. pilligaensis

Binomial name
- Pseudomys pilligaensis Fox & Briscoe, 1980

= Pilliga mouse =

Species of rodent

Pseudomys pilligaensis, commonly known as the Pilliga mouse or poolkoo, is a species of rodent in the family Muridae. Its distribution comprises the Pilliga forest region of New South Wales, Australia, specimens have also been trapped in the Warrumbungle National Park and Weetalibah Nature Reserve. Its conservation status is currently listed as "Data Deficient" due to unresolved questions on its taxonomic status.

== Description ==
P. pilligaensis is a small brown mouse with grey-brown upper parts, the head and back greyer, grading through russet flanks to white underparts. The feet are pale pink on top with white hairs. The head-body length is 73–80 millimetres (3–3 in) and the tail about the same length or slightly less. The tail is pale pink with a distinct brown line along the top and a small tuft of darker hairs on the end. The ear length is 15–18 millimetres (0.6–0.7 in) and the weight of the animal is 10–14 grams (0.4–0.5 oz).

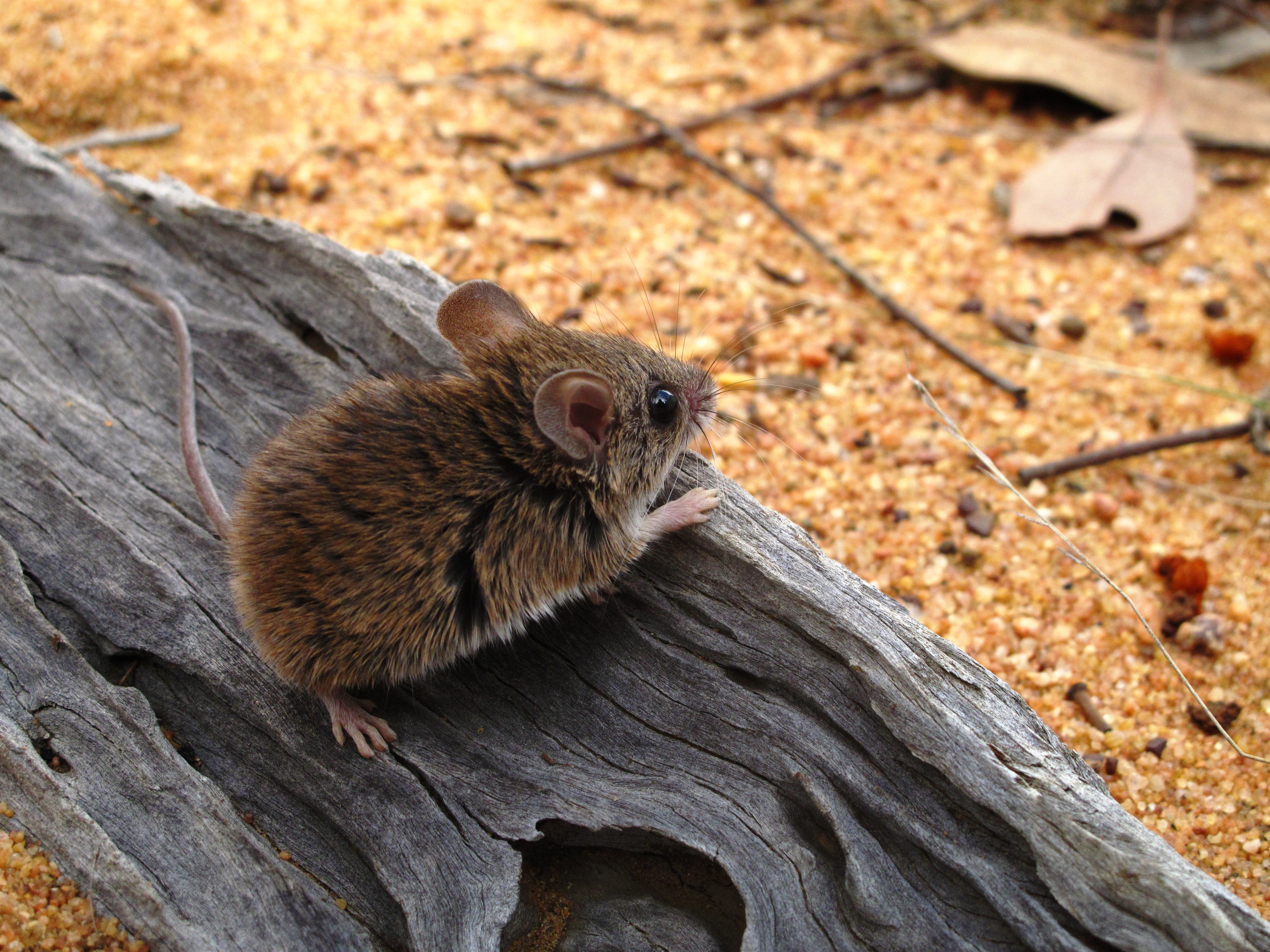
Pseudomys pilligaensis in the Pilliga forest

== Taxonomy ==
The Pilliga mouse was first formally described in 1980 by Barry Fox and David Briscoe. They distinguished it from the similar species P. novohollandiae, P. delicatulus and P. hermannsburgensis on the basis of characters such as skull size and shape and the ratio between tail and head/body length. More recent work has suggested that it is a southern population of the delicate mouse Pseudomys delicatulus. Another suggestion is that it is it a hybrid between Pseudomys delicatulus and the New Holland mouse (Pseudomys novaehollandiae).

== Distribution and habitat ==
P. pilligaensis was described as having a restricted distribution in the Pilliga forest in central New South Wales, initially collected from only four sites within the Pilliga "scrub", none more than 50 km apart. More recent work has shown the Pilliga Mouse is found across central and eastern sections of the Pilliga forest. However, after a bushfire in January 2013 which burned about 80% of the Warrumbungle National Park, a specimen was collected in that park. Pilliga mouse populations increase rapidly in size after fire and rain. Recent research indicates that preferred habitat for this species includes shrubby woodlands and heathlands, particularly where Broombush Melaleuca uncinata and Bloodwood Corymbia trachyphloia occurs. The mouse is nocturnal and lives in burrows.

== Conservation ==
As of January 2015, the Pilliga mouse is currently listed by the IUCN as "Data Deficient" because of the uncertainty of its taxonomic status. If further research indicated that the Pilliga mouse is a separate species, its status would be determined as "Endangered". Threats to the population in the Pilliga include exploration and infrastructure construction relating to coal seam gas, as well as habitat loss through forestry, predation by the introduced cat and fox, and competition from the house mouse.
