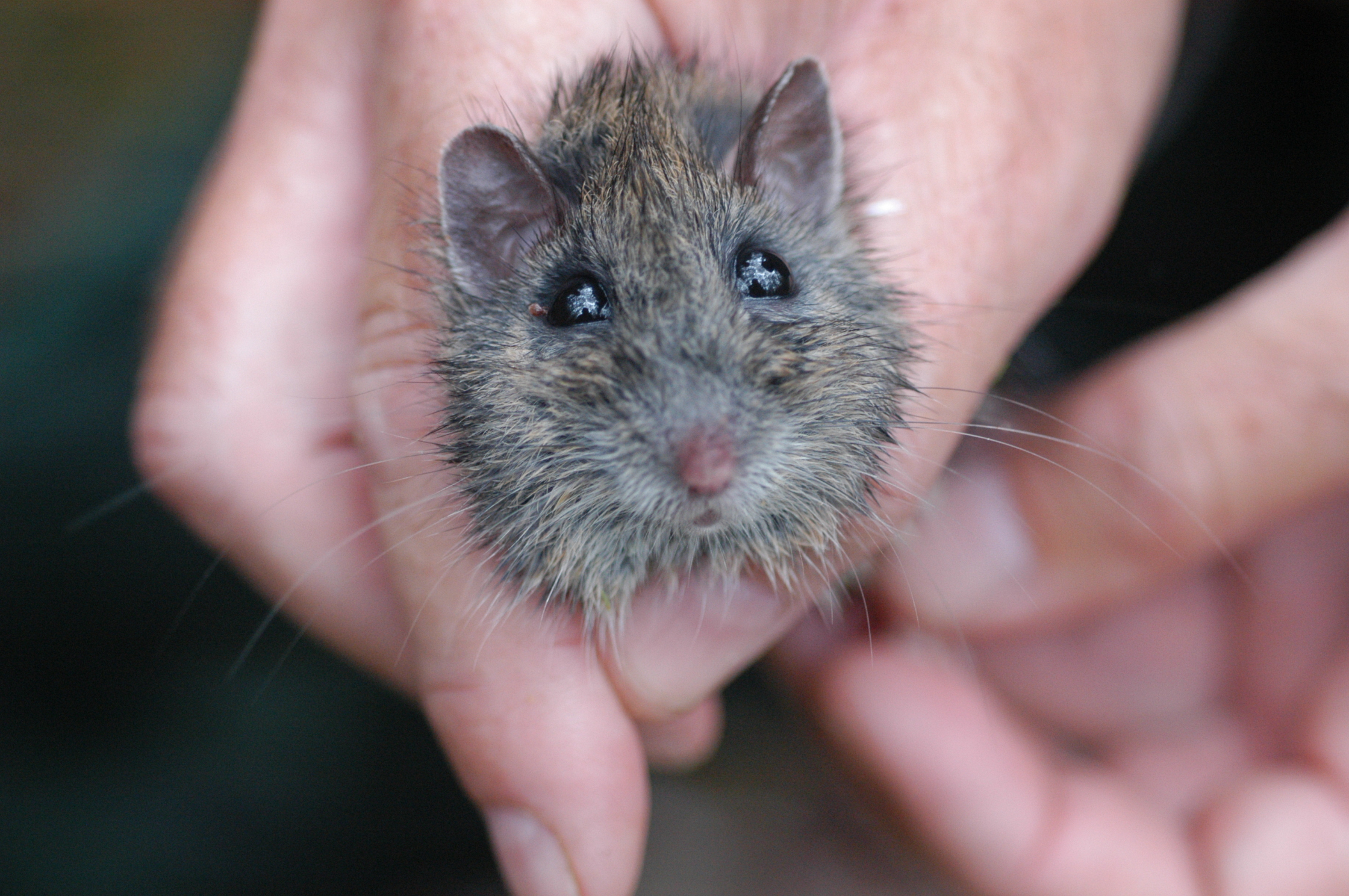

Conservation status
- Vulnerable (IUCN 3.1)

Scientific classification
- Kingdom: Animalia
- Phylum: Chordata
- Class: Mammalia
- Order: Rodentia
- Family: Muridae
- Genus: Pseudomys
- Species: P. oralis

Binomial name
- Pseudomys oralis Thomas, 1921

= Hastings River mouse =

Species of mammal

The Hastings River mouse (Pseudomys oralis) is a species of Australian rodent in the subfamily Murinae of the family Muridae. It is found only in Australia.

== Ecological role ==
Although it is not known if the Hastings River mouse nests with other breeds of this rodent or individually, it is known that in captivity, the Hastings River mouse can eat grain. In the wild, the species adapts well to the seasons by eating various plant materials in the summer and when winter comes, the diet is supplemented by fungi. There is a breeding season in the wild that occurs from August through March. There is also mating that occurs during the winter.

== Population and conservation role ==
There is little known on the population of this species, as the species is both rare and elusive. The Hastings River mouse is often found in New South Wales, Eastern Australia and Queensland in altitudes reaching 1200 m. The Hastings River mouse is easily killed by humans suggesting possible domesticity of this species.

== Size and biology ==
The body and head of this species measures about 145 mm and the average tail measurement is about 140 mm, slightly larger than most other mice. It also weighs an approximate 92 g.
