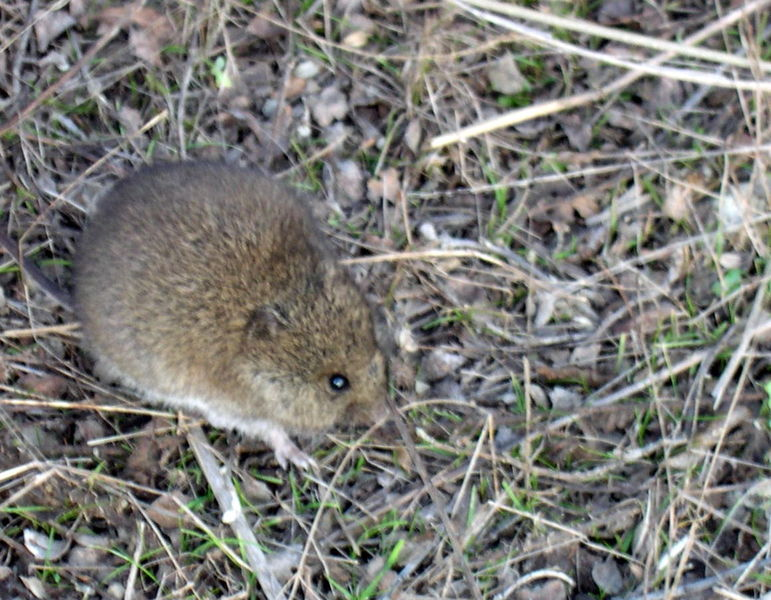

Conservation status
- Near Threatened (IUCN 3.1)

Scientific classification
- Kingdom: Animalia
- Phylum: Chordata
- Class: Mammalia
- Order: Rodentia
- Family: Muridae
- Genus: Pseudomys
- Species: P. occidentalis

Binomial name
- Pseudomys occidentalis Tate, 1951

= Western mouse =

Species of rodent

The western mouse or walyadji (Pseudomys occidentalis) is a species of rodent in the family Muridae. Once widespread across a larger range, it has become restricted to around ten reserves of remnant bushland in Southwest Australia and declared near threatened by extinction. They are small and robust mice that live in burrows in sandy soil, venturing out at night to forage in nearby area.

== Taxonomy ==
A murine species that was first described by George H. H. Tate in 1951, using specimens obtained in 1930. The holotype is a skin and skull of a young adult collected at Tambellup by J. Baldwin, with Tate referring to a second specimen with a damaged skull as slightly larger.

Assigned to a diverse and poorly resolved genus, Pseudomys, the describing author allied the species to a subgeneric classification as Gyomys.

The term walyadji is used to refer to the species, but this word does not appear in a literature review of Noongar language names for mammals of the region.

== Description ==
This mouse is roughly 10 centimeters long, not counting its tail, which may be up to 14 centimeters in length. It weighs an average of 34 grams. It has a soft, fine, dark gray and yellowish buff pelage that is interspersed with black guard hairs. The feet are white.

The species is distinguished by the aquiline profile of nose, and its long tail. The range of measurements for the head and body combined is 88 to 110 millimetres, exceeded by the tail's length of 120 to 140 mm. The hind feet of Pseudomys occidentalis are 24 to 28 mm, relatively long for the genus, with interdigital pads that are larger than the terminal pads. The proportion of the pads and lack of granulation over the surface of the hind foot distinguishes the species from the ash-grey species Pseudomys albocinereus. They have two pairs of inguinal teats. The weight range of the species is 30 to 55 grams.

== Behaviour ==
The subterranean nests have a single entrance, a shaft that connects to a network 200 to 300 millimetres below the ground. The main tunnel has a nest site at the opposite end of a loop, two to three metres from the entrance, with a network of other loops extending as annexes to the central tunnel. The site may be occupied by up to ten individuals.

== Distribution and habitat ==
The distribution range once extended across Southwest Australia and into the arid interior, this became restricted to a few areas near the Ravensthorpe Range, at Fitzgerald River National Park, and several isolated populations in the southern wheatbelt.

This mouse lives in loamy soils in areas that have not been burnt recently, and not known at any location that has been subjected to fire in the preceding 30 to 50 years. The terrain has climax vegetation, especially the desert quandong Santalum acuminatum and sedge-like plants. The substrate of the ecological communities in which they are known to remain is sandy or sandy-clay soil that is often intermixed with gravel. Plant genera associated with their remnant sites are Eucalyptus, Acacia, Isopogon, Allocasuarina and Melaleuca, and the vegetation of their habitat is highly variable, including open woodlands, low and tall shrubland, mallee and heath in open to dense arrangements of plants.

After being identified in 1951, the species was known by five specimens until the region's survey and collection of mammals was begun by the state's museum in 1971.

== Conservation ==
The conservations status of the species was assessed as near threatened in 2016, with a declining population in an area of occupancy less than 200 km^{2}. The fragmented populations inhabit remnants of its preferred habitat, estimated from earlier surveys to be greater than 10 and a decline less than 30% in three generations. Loss of habitat and an anthropogenic climate change is expected to impact upon the species population trajectory.
