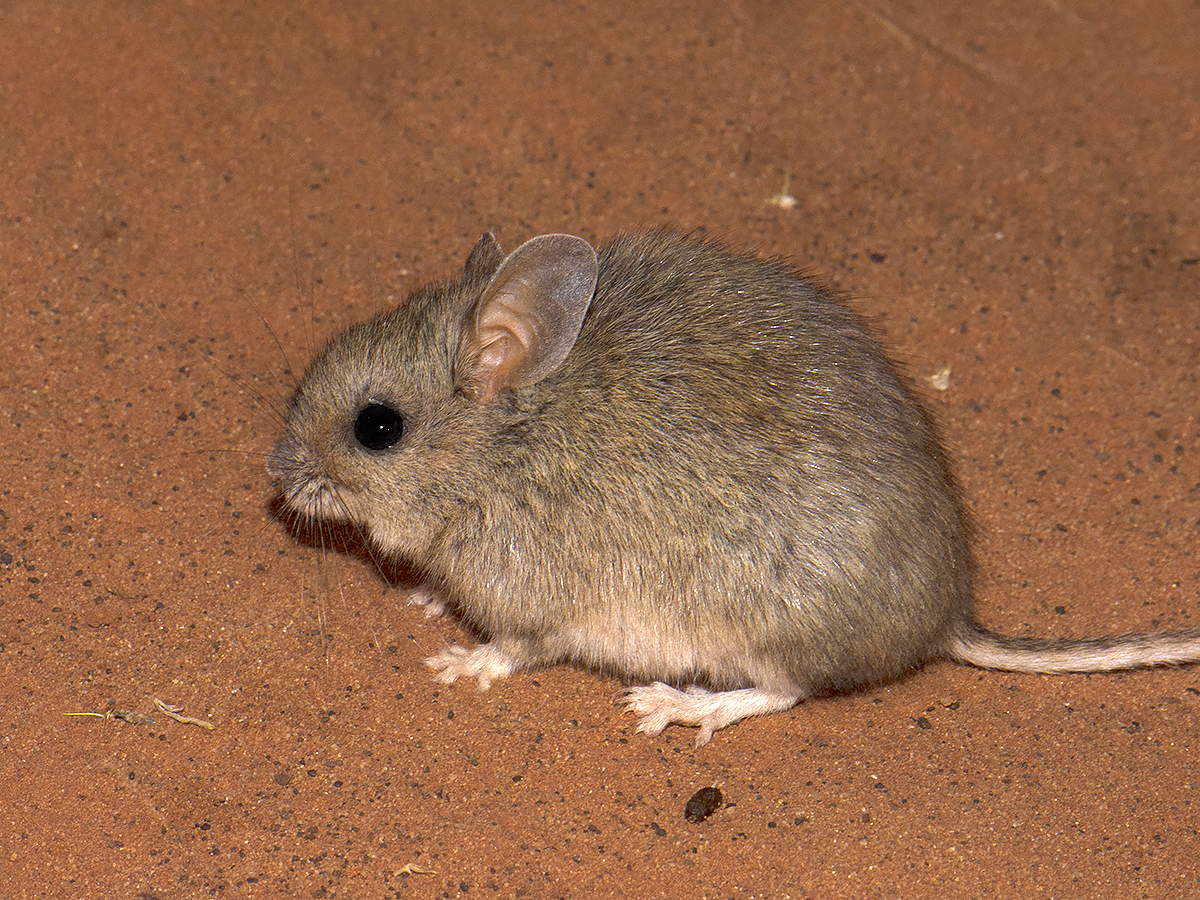
- near Mount Dare Station, South Australia Photography by Tim Bawden (2017)

Conservation status
- Vulnerable (IUCN 3.1)

Scientific classification
- Kingdom: Animalia
- Phylum: Chordata
- Class: Mammalia
- Order: Rodentia
- Family: Muridae
- Genus: Pseudomys
- Species: P. australis

Binomial name
- Pseudomys australis Gray, 1832
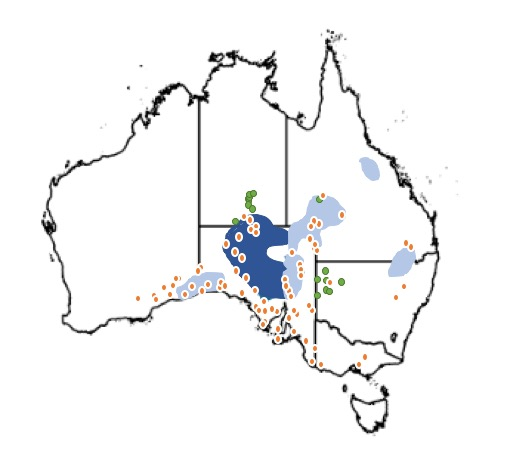
- The historical distribution (pre-1980) and assumed extant distribution (1980-2018) of the plains rat across Australia.

= Plains rat =

Plains rat Temporal range: Pliocene – Recent

Species of rodent

The plains rat (Pseudomys australis), also known as the palyoora, plains mouse and eastern mouse, is a conilurine rodent native to arid and semi-arid Australia. Referred to as the pallyoora or yarlie by Indigenous groups, the plains rat was once widely distributed across central Australia, including north-west New South Wales and south-west Queensland; however, habitat degradation due to grazing, introduced predators and drought have contributed to its decline. Consequently, the plains rat has been listed as 'presumed extinct' in New South Wales and Victoria, 'endangered' in the Northern Territory and Queensland and 'vulnerable' in Western Australia and South Australia. While recent research has indicated the presence of the plains rat in areas such as the Fowlers Gap and Strzelecki Desert regions of New South Wales and within the Diamantina National Park in Queensland, there are only five sub-populations currently recognised nationally, none of which coincide with recent discoveries of the plains rat. As the current population trend of the plains rat has been listed as 'declining' by the International Union for the Conservation of Nature (IUCN), the IUCN conservation status for the species is 'vulnerable'.

== Taxonomy ==
The name Pseudomys comes from the combined form of the Greek word pseudes (meaning "false") and the Latin word mys (meaning "mouse"), presumably because of the plains rat's puzzling similarities and differences to "true mice" in the genus mus. The name australis comes from the Latin word australis (meaning "south land"). Thus, the name Pseudomys australis, first described by Grey in 1832, means 'false mouse from the southern land'.

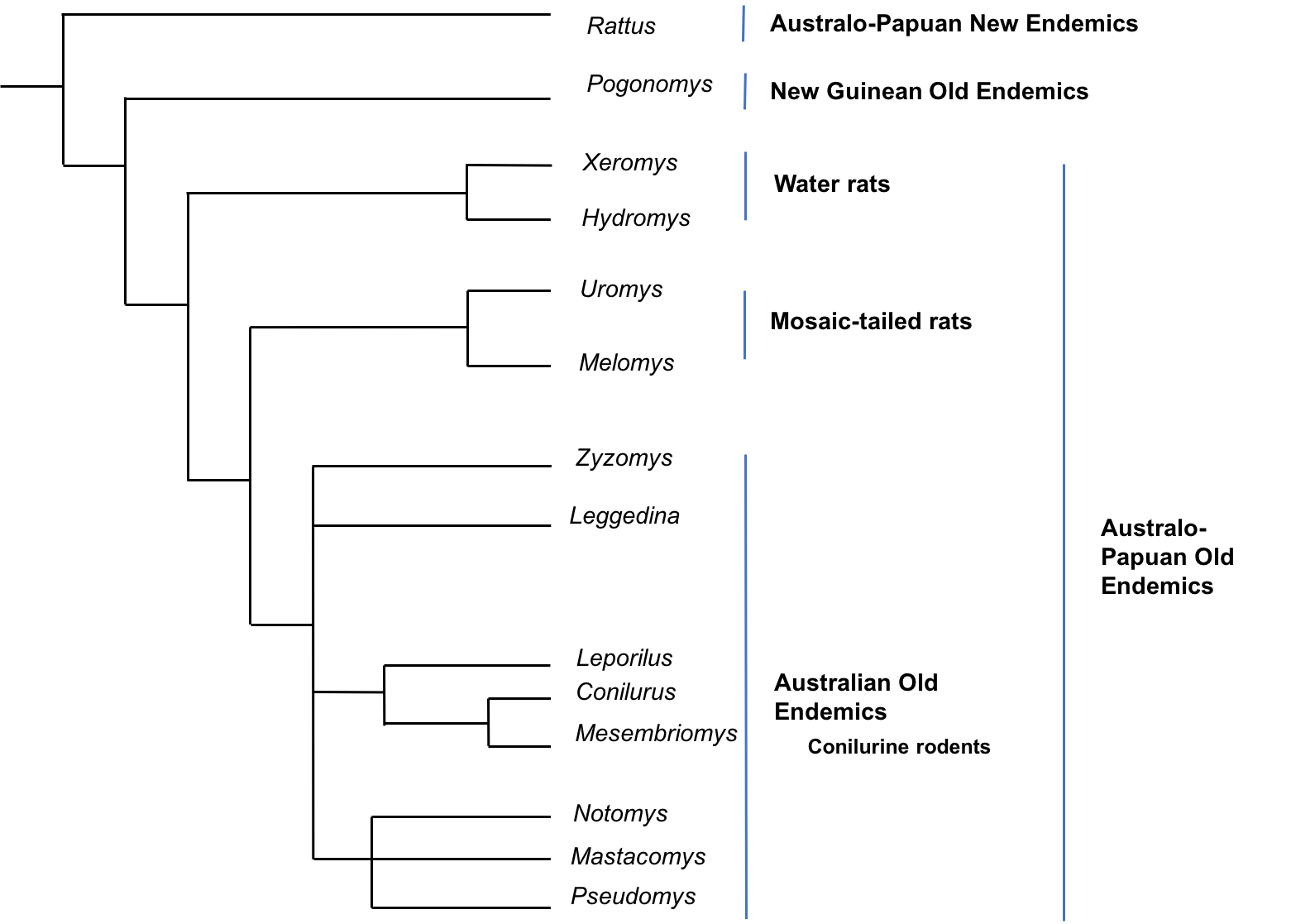
The phylogeny of rodents of the Subfamily Murinae.

The taxonomy of Australian rodents remains controversial; however, it is commonly accepted that there are two major groups including the Australo-Papuan Old Endemics and the Australo-Papuan New Endemics. The plains rat is considered an Australo-Papuan Old Endemic as DNA sequencing from fossilised evidence suggests that its ancestors first arrived in Australia between 4.2 and 5 million years ago, during the Pliocene era. Old endemics, particularly the Family Muridae, are believed to have originated in Southern Asia and then diversified through multiple rodent lineages. Relationships between Australian members of the Order Rodentia suggest that a New Guinean lineage gave rise to the Australo-Papuan Old Endemics and thus the early ancestors of the plains rat.

The plains rat is an Australian conilurine rodent of the Order Rodentia. Within the Order Rodentia are two suborders: the Hystricognathi and the Sciurognathi. The Suborder Sciurognathi comprises several groups; however, the largest group, the Family Muridae, is inclusive of the Subfamily Murinae and Genus Pseudomys, of which the plains rat is classified. Australian native rodents are composed of 13 genera, reflective of the habitats in which they occur. Pseudomys occupy the arid and semi-arid regions of Australia; however, fossil records suggest that the plains rat has occupied far more diverse habitats in the past, contributing to difficulties in determining the differences between populations of the same species and different species within the Genus Pseudomys. Thus, the species P. australis now includes all specimens previously classified as P. rowlinnae, P. minnie and P. auritus.

== Distribution and habitat ==
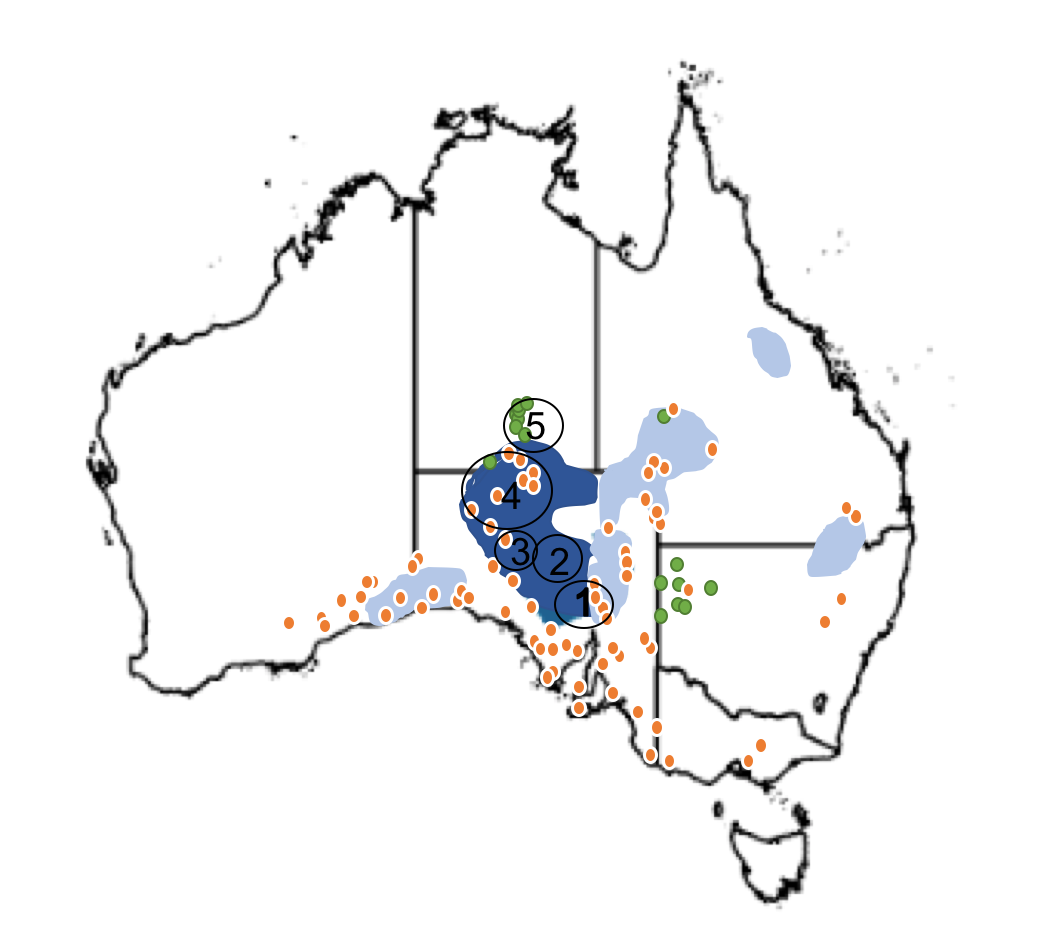
The five primary extant populations of the plains rat as recognised by the 2012 National Recovery Plan.

The primary extant population of the plains rat can be divided into five broad geographic zones: 1) the Arcoona Tableland, SA; 2) the Southern Lake Eyre region, SA; 3) the Moon Plain region, SA; 4) the Oodnadatta region (including Witjira National Park), SA/NT; and, 5) the Andado Station and Mac Clark Conservation Reserve, NT. These areas are characterised by access to boulders, small stones and gilgais (depressions and water soaks) and are consistent with the plain rat's primary habitat type of stone-covered plains.

Historically, the plains rat was widely distributed across a broad range of habitats including river flats, grasslands, sand ridges and lowland shrubs; however, the current assumed distribution of the plains rat is limited to the gibber (stone-covered) plains in central-northern South-Australia. These areas are characterised by cracking clay, productive depressions and minor drainage lines which support low open scrublands and ephemeral grass or herb lands. While an individual's home range is roughly 1.6 hectares, colonies may extend beyond their preferred habitat type in search of drought refuges, essentially increasing their home range. These refuges are usually areas of higher shelter and food availability with more productive vegetation types. Similarly, during times of high rainfall, populations displaced due to flood inundation may migrate temporarily into surrounding habitat types.

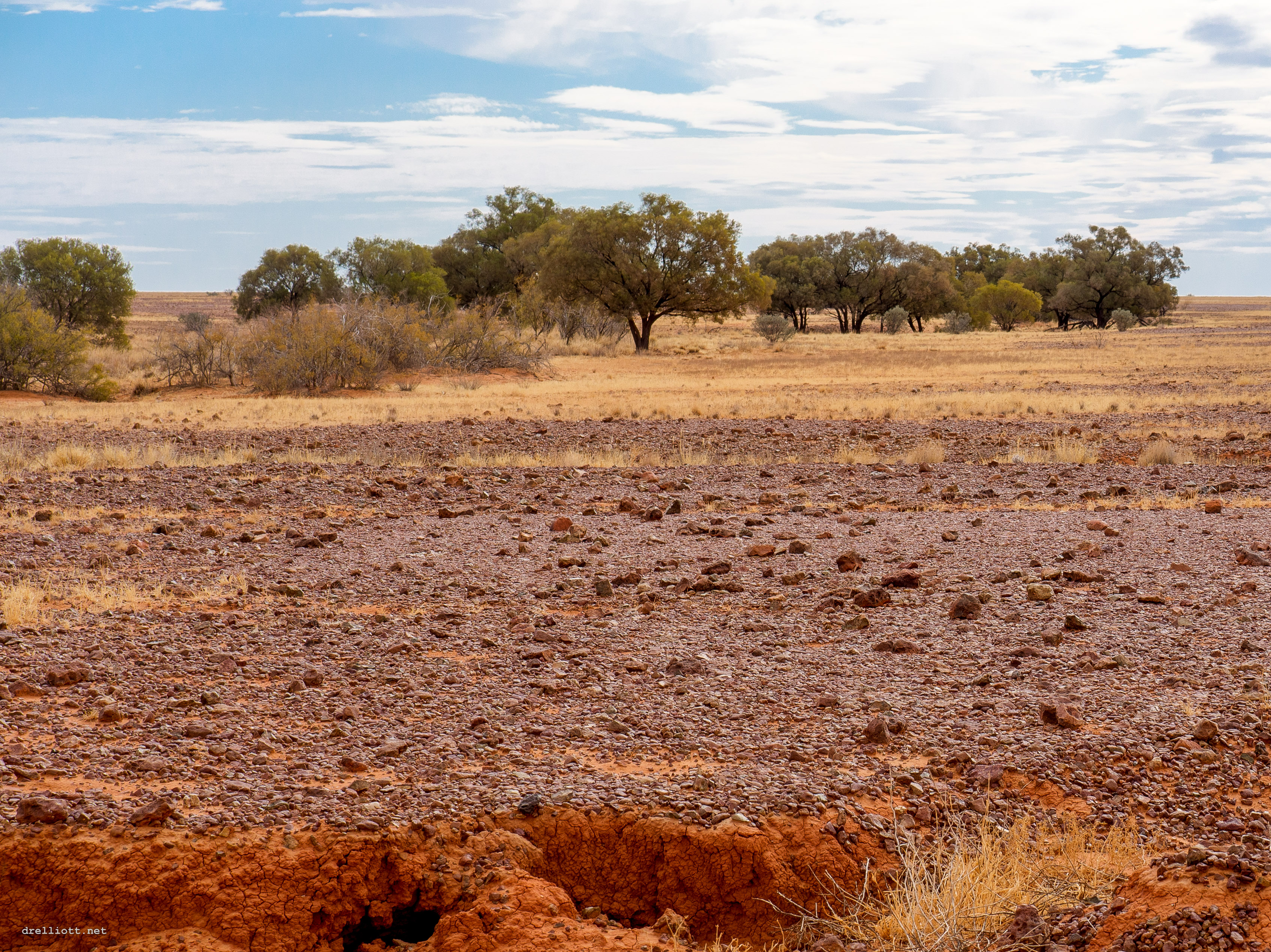
Gibber country in Diamantina National Park, QLD, Australia. Photography by David Elliott (24/07/2015).

== Physical description ==
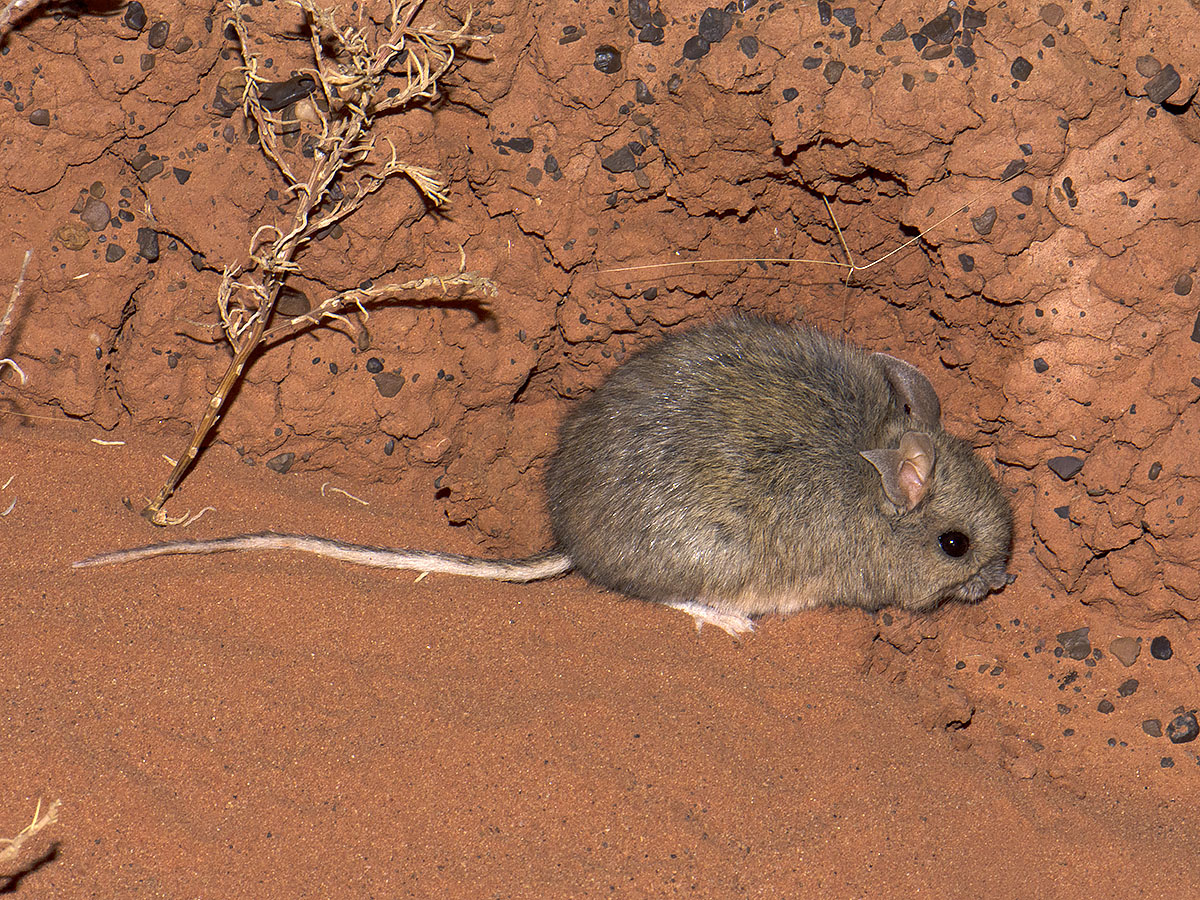
Plains rat at Mac Clark (Acacia peuce) Conservation Reserve, NT, Australia. Photography by Tim Bawden (18/09/2017).

The plains rat has a stocky build of around 65 grams with long ears and a rounded muzzle and is grey to brown along its back with white or cream lining its underbelly. Its combined head and body length is usually between 90 and 145 millimetres and its tail is roughly as long as its body. During lactation, females can be observed dragging their young as they each latch to one of the four teats located on its underbelly.

== Behaviour and ecology ==
The plains rat constructs a complex system of shallow connected tunnels beneath the cracking clay of gibber plains, emerging only at night to feed on seeds, stems and arthropods. The home range of an adult is roughly 1.6 hectares. During non-breeding periods both sexes live together in colonies of up to 20 individuals; however, during breeding periods one male occupies a burrow with up to three females. During breeding cycles males becoming increasingly agitated and both sexes are known to stand on their hind feet and squeal loudly when threatened. Whilst breeding is not regularly seasonal, young is generally produced after sexual maturity is reached at 8–10 weeks and after a gestation period of 30–31 days. Litter sizes usually consist of four young but up to seven young can be produced in one litter.

The lifespan of the plains rat is generally two years; however, their survival often depends on resource availability. Thus, during years of consecutively high rainfall, their lifespan can approach 4.5 years. Similarly, during severe drought most will only survive one year.

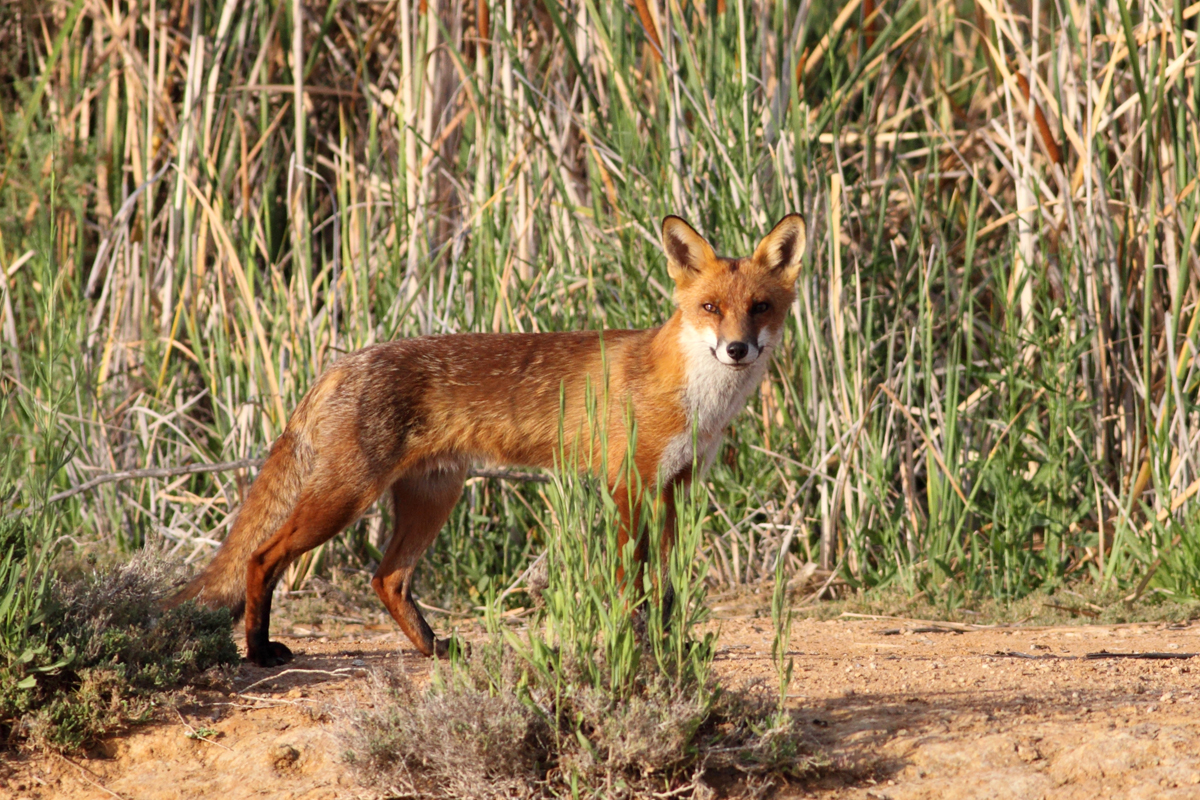
European red fox (Vulpes vulpes), a common predator of the plains rat. Lake Cargelligo, NSW, Australia. Photography by Harley Kingston (03/01/2012).

== Threats ==
Habitat degradation, introduced predators and drought collectively threaten the survival of the plains rat. Habitat degradation mainly derives from introduced hoofed stock and land clearing. Hoofed stock lessen vegetation cover, crush the seed bank and trample burrows while land clearing removes food sources vital to the survival of the plains rat. Reduced vegetation cover and damaged burrows only makes it easier for introduced predators such as the European fox (Vulpes vulpes) and feral cat (Felis catus) to excavate shallow burrows. This can contribute to local extinctions, particularly when populations are already low during periods of drought. Other potential threats to the plains rat include altered fire regimes, leading to increased intensity of bushfires; competition with the introduced house mouse (Mus musculus) and European rabbit (Oryctolagus cuniculus); and, climate change.

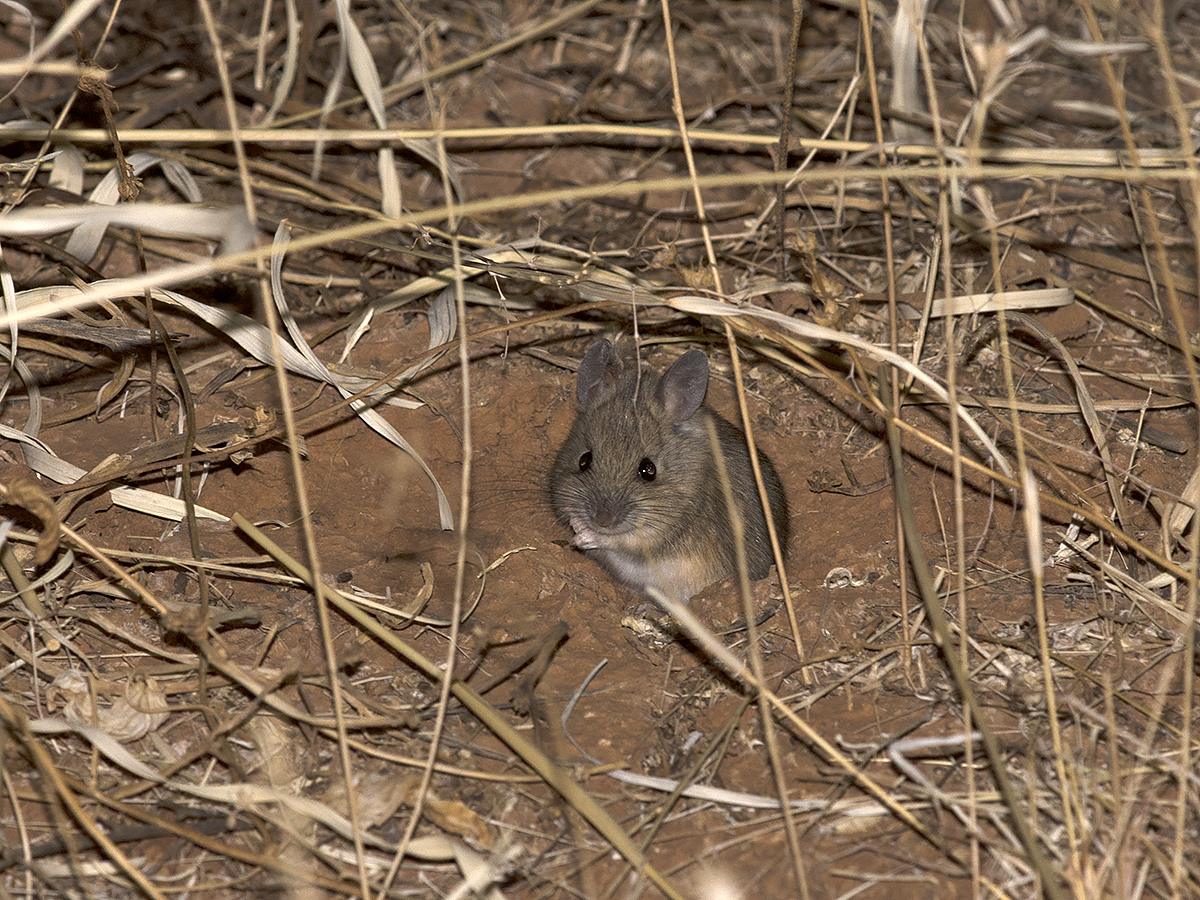
Plains rat near Mount Dare Station, SA, Australia. Photography by Tim Bawden (07/09/2017).

== Conservation ==
The Action Plan for Australian Mammals 2012 identifies three main conservation objectives for the plains rat. These objectives include: 1) managing threats in order to secure or increase the plain rat's overall population size; 2) maintaining viable sub-populations where the plains rat is known to occur; and, 3) identifying and protecting drought refugia. The 2012 National Recovery Plan for the Plains Mouse encourages collaboration between communities, governments and industries to meet these conservation objectives in order to conserve the plains rat.

A captive population from Alice Springs Desert Park in Northern Territory, Australia has provided the opportunity for research used to promote easy health assessment tools for both captive and wildlife populations.

== See also ==
- Rodent - For more detailed information on the order Rodentia including the classification and evolution; distribution and habitat; and, behavioural characteristics of the order Rodentia.
- Pseudomys - For a species list of Australian native mice which are classified in the genus of Pseudomys.
