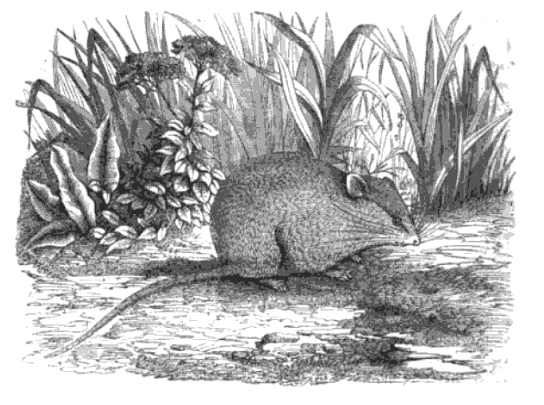

Conservation status
- Least Concern (IUCN 3.1)

Scientific classification
- Kingdom: Animalia
- Phylum: Chordata
- Class: Mammalia
- Order: Rodentia
- Family: Muridae
- Genus: Pseudomys
- Species: P. albocinereus

Binomial name
- Pseudomys albocinereus (Gould, 1845)

Synonyms
- Mus albocinereus

= Ash-grey mouse =

Species of rodent

The ash-grey mouse (Pseudomys albocinereus) is a rodent in the family Muridae. Larger and more robust than Mus musculus, the common house mouse, it is found only in Southwest Australia.

== Taxonomy ==
The first description was published by John Gould in 1845, naming the type location as Moore's River for a collection made at the interior of Western Australia. Gould placed the new species with the genus Mus, giving his comparison of the features to the familiar house mouse of Europe.

The phylogeny of the species is variably placed by the results of early analyses, although revision of alliances in the probably polyphyletic genus only demonstrates a close relationship to the silky mouse Pseudomys apodemoides.

Gould's entry in Mammals of Australia (1863) notes two names used by the local peoples, noo-jee at Perth and jup-pert at Moore's River. These two names were reported to Gould and others by John Gilbert, using records of interviews he conducted at the Swan River Colony and Moore River. The first name, noodji (pronounced noodj'i), was provided by other informants of the Noongar language and was regularized in an ethnographic survey for proposal as a preferred common name.

== Description ==
A medium sized species of the genus Pseudomys, in a weight range of 15 to 40 g (0.53 to 1.41 oz) and distinguished by its long and soft fur. The colour of the pelage is mid-grey with patches of fawn, the paler underparts extend to white areas of fur below the eye and over the snout. They are noted for the camouflage provided by their coloration, which closely matches their sandy habitat. The length of the head and body is 70 to 100 mm (2.8 to 3.9 in), and the tail is slightly longer at 85 to 110 mm (3.3 to 4.3 in). There is a small amount of hair at the tail, the scales of which are pinkish except at the upper surface near the body where a line of dark brown appears. The hind foot measurement is 20 to 25 mm (0.79 to 0.98 in) and has granulated surface at the underside, the terminal pads of the five toes are larger than the interdigital and posthallucal pads. The ears are the typical form of the genus, smaller than most murines, the greatest length from notch at the head to the tip is 17 to 19 mm (0.67 to 0.75 in). They possess two pairs of inguinal teats, for a total of four.

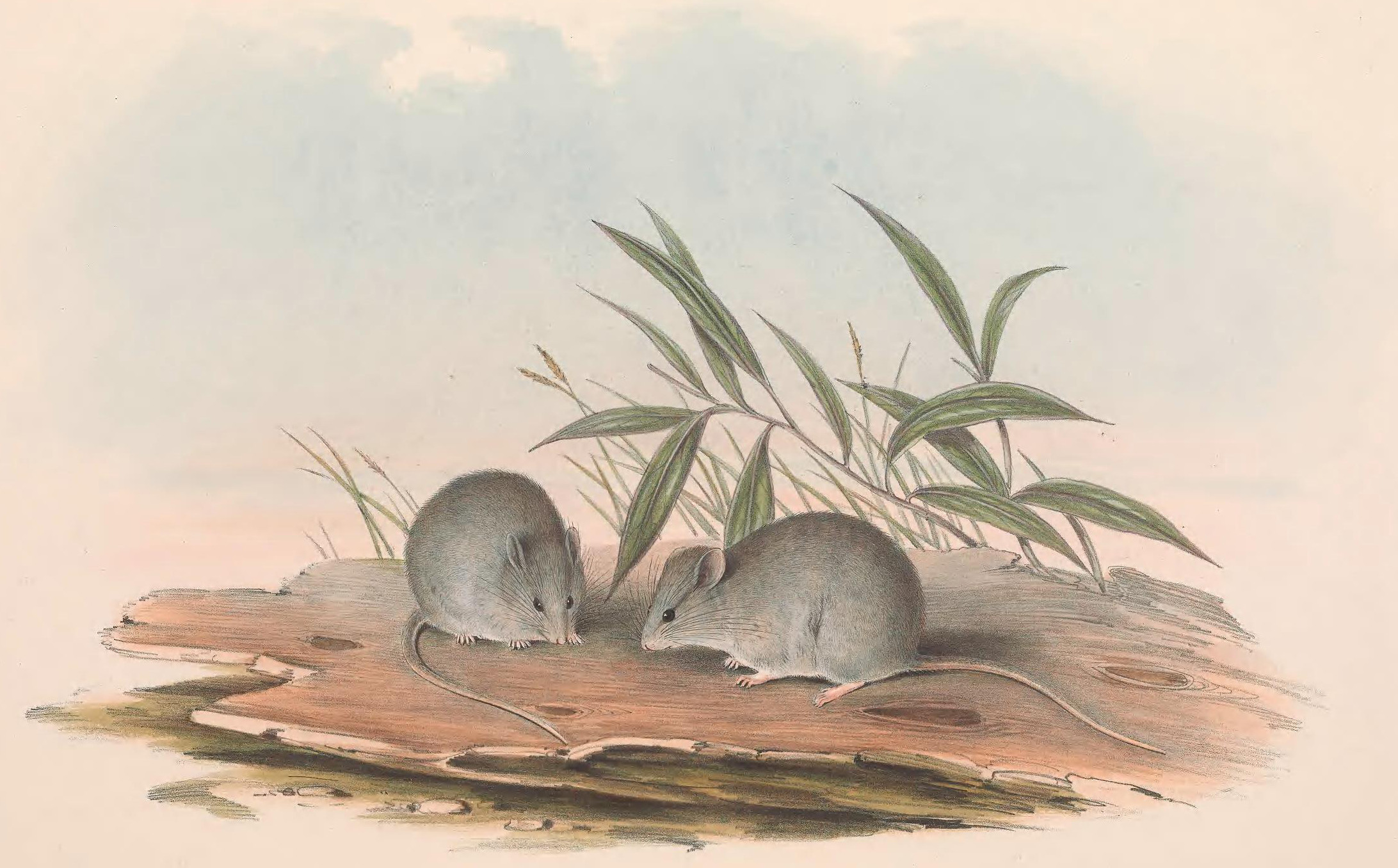
Mus albocinereus by Henry C. Richter in Gould's Mammals of Australia 1863

They overlap in range with Pseudomys occidentalis, locally referred to as the western mouse, which is distinguished by a relatively long and grey rather than pink tail, a buff coloration of their pelage, interdigital pads that are larger than the terminal pads of the toes and lack of the granulated texture at the hind foot of this species. The introduced european mouse, Mus musculus, has distinctly smaller eyes, a characteristic notch on the incisors and familiar mousey odour.

== Behaviour ==
Their nature is gentle and docile, foraging at night and residing in deep burrow complexes or nests arranged in leaf detritus or the hollows of logs. The omnivorous diet includes arthropods, but is mostly seeds and green vegetation such as leaves and shoots. Pseudomys albocinereus usually moves across the ground, but will also ascend the branches of lower shrubs in search of food. The breeding pattern varies in the west, where a single litter is produced in the austral spring, but breeding occurs in any favourable conditions at the interior to the east.

These mice are well adapted to an arid and sandy environment; they are nocturnal and fossorial, have plugged entrances to burrows and huddle in groups to decrease evaporation rates. Females give birth to litters of between two and six young after a gestation period of between 37 and 38 days.

== Distribution and habitat ==
The preferred habitat of the mouse are areas of low heathland or scrubland with sandy soils. The vegetation is kwongan coastal heath or tall shrubs that intersperse an understorey of tussock grasses. The distribution range is from Shark Bay to Israelite Bay in Southwest Australia, a temperate forested region with a mediterranean climate; they are widespread but not common within this range. They also occur offshore at Bernier and Dorre Islands, where the population is named as subspecies Pseudomys albocinereus squalorum.

When described again by Gould in 1863, he noted the species was common at the coastal dunes north of the Swan River Colony.
