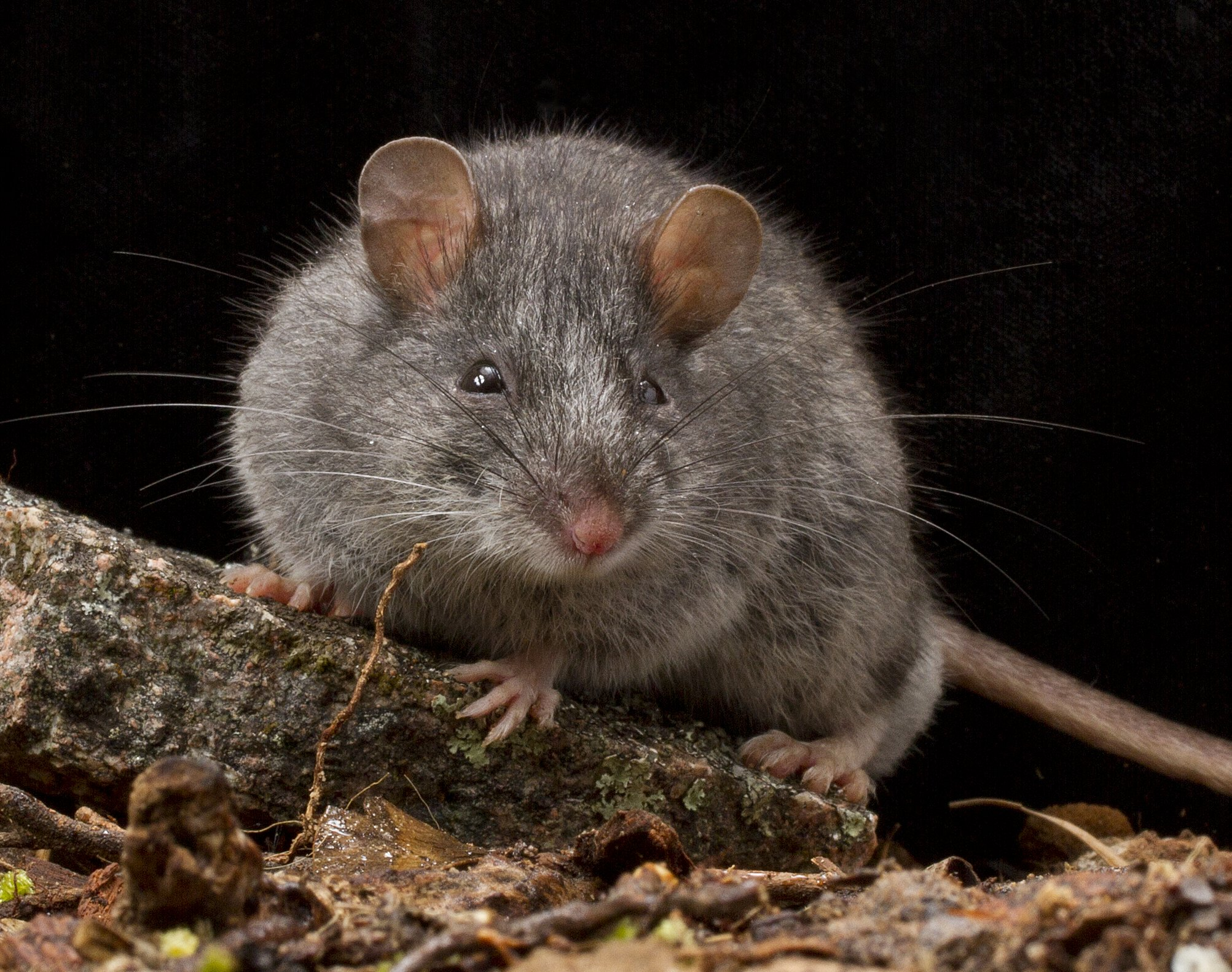
- A female smoky mouse from the Grampians.

Conservation status
- Vulnerable (IUCN 3.1)

Scientific classification
- Kingdom: Animalia
- Phylum: Chordata
- Class: Mammalia
- Order: Rodentia
- Family: Muridae
- Genus: Pseudomys
- Species: P. fumeus

Binomial name
- Pseudomys fumeus Brazenor, 1934

= Smoky mouse =

Species of rodent

The smoky mouse (Pseudomys fumeus) is a species of rodent in the family Muridae native to southeastern Australia. It was first described in 1934 and its species name is Latin for "smoky". As its name suggests, it is a grey-furred mouse, darker grey above and paler smoky grey below. Mice from the Grampians are larger and a darker more slate-grey above. It has a black eye-ring and a dark grey muzzle. The feet are light pink, and the ears are grey-pink. The tail is longer than the mouse's body, and is pink with a brownish stripe along the top. Mice from east of Melbourne average around 35 grams and have 107 mm long bodies with 116 mm long tails, while those from the Grampians are around 65 grams and have 122 mm long bodies with 132 mm long tails.

The smoky mouse is currently rated as "vulnerable" and appears to be declining in numbers in the wild. Its range is fragmented and it appears to be extinct in some areas such as the Otway Ranges (not seen since 1985) and Brindabella Ranges (not seen since 1987). It is found in the Grampians, East Gippsland and far southeastern New South Wales (including Kosciuszko and South East Forest National Parks and Buccleugh State Forest). There are fewer than 2500 individuals left in the wild and all extant populations appear to be in decline. Vegetation changes, as well as feral cats, foxes and dogs appear to be the main causes. There is an active recovery plan for the species, and there is active predator monitoring in the Yowaka and Waalimma sections of the South East Forest National Park.

In February 2020 it was reported that researchers from Charles Sturt University, found the death of nine smoky mice was from "severe lung disease" caused by smoke haze during the 2019–20 Australian bushfires that contained PM2.5 particles coming from bushfires 50 kilometres away. It was feared that the Kosciuszko National Park population had been extirpated as a result of the bushfires, but individuals were rediscovered in June 2020.

In other languages it has been called fausse souris fuligineuse (French), raton bastardo fumoso (Spanish), or koonoom (?).
