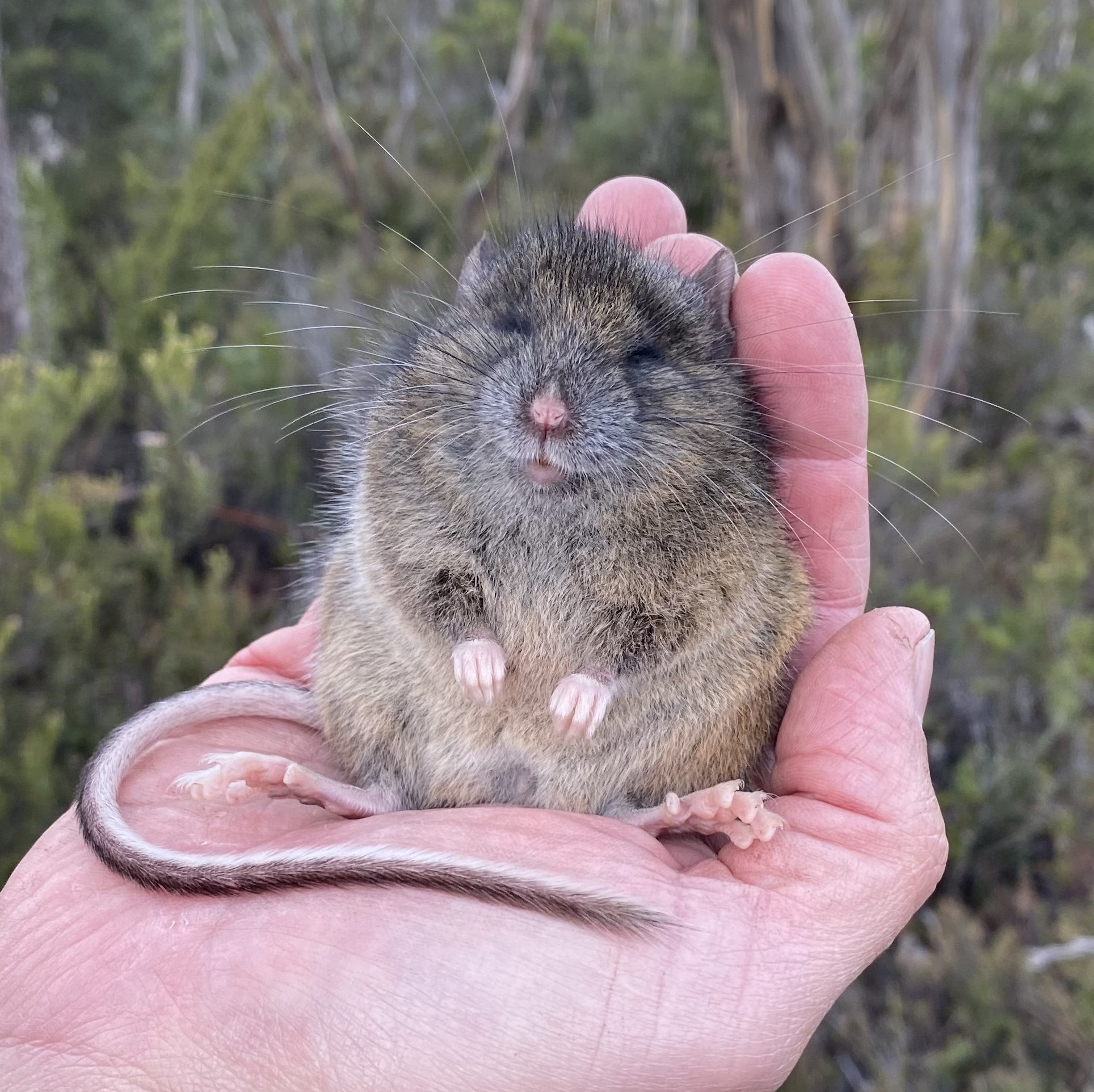

Conservation status
- Least Concern (IUCN 3.1)

Scientific classification
- Kingdom: Animalia
- Phylum: Chordata
- Class: Mammalia
- Order: Rodentia
- Family: Muridae
- Genus: Pseudomys
- Species: P. higginsi

Binomial name
- Pseudomys higginsi Trouessart, 1897

= Long-tailed mouse =

Species of rodent

The long-tailed mouse (Pseudomys higginsi) is a native Australian mammal in the Order Rodentia and the Family Muridae. It is found only on the island of Tasmania. The long-tailed mouse is an omnivore that feeds on insects and a range of plants. It is found in forested areas, particularly in sub-alpine scree, and may live in burrows.

The species reaches a weight of about 70 grams. It is distinguished from other species by its two-tone tail, which is white on the underside and dark above. The tail is 1.3 times longer than the head and body combined. It is speculated that P.higginsi uses its tail for balance while leaping in habitat such as boulder screes.

Fossils of this species have been found in Cloggs Cave, Buchan in eastern Victoria and were identified by palaeontologist Jeanette Hope. The date for the remains based on C-14 dating were between 12 and 20,000 years old.

== Distribution and habitat ==
The long-tailed mouse ranges from sea level to approximately 1,200 m. and seems to prefer habitats that offer high rainfall, such as wet forests. It is a habitat generalist which is resilient to environmental modifications. In a study of short-term responses of native rodents to various logging styles in old growth wet Eucalyptus forests, it was found that the long-tailed mouse was equally abundant across all forestry treatments and was positively correlated to reduced ground cover.

Another study found that significantly greater numbers of long-tailed mouse were found in wet disturbed forests and that logging and harvesting did not effect the diversity of the local ecosystem. A conservational study conducted in 2012 was able to compare the historical range of the long-tailed mouse to its current range to determine if this helped predict the risk of extinction. Reduced geographic range size is often a strong predictor of species decline. It was shown that despite modern habitat loss, the long-tailed mouse is less threatened than would be expected from just the loss of its historical habitat ranges.

== Diet ==
The long-tailed mouse is an opportunistic generalist omnivore whose diet is seasonal and varies with local availability. Using fecal analysis, it was found to consume a wide range of plant matter, such as grasses, grains, bamboo, fruits, ferns, and mosses. It was also found to consume fungi and insects of wide varieties.

== Ecology ==
The long-tailed mouse is a primarily nocturnal mammal but can also be active during the day. It is found primarily in rainforest, wet scrub, eucalyptus scrub, sedgeland, and low alpine vegetation.

Relevant abundance of the long-tailed mouse is correlated to several other species in its habitat. Lazenby et.al. was able to show across four independent sample areas that the abundance of the long-tailed mouse was correlated positively to swamp rats (Rattus lutreolus velutinus) and negatively correlated to feral cats (Felis catus). Tasmanian devils were also shown to have a negative effect on the long-tailed mouse and all other small mammal populations surveyed in this study.

== Life cycle ==
The long-tailed mouse breeds seasonally from September through June Gestation generally lasts approximately 31–33 days, with an average litter of 3 young. Young become fully independent 33 days after birth and reach adult size at approximately 40 days. The tail will continue to grow until they are approximately 75 days old. There is no significant sexual dimorphism in this species. However, there is some geographic variation in the species concerning overall body weight, hind foot length, and tail length.

As a mammal, P.higginsi nurses their young from shortly after birth until weaning. The young fasten themselves to the nipples, which allow for the mother to take evasive actions when necessary.
