= Blue-gray mouse =

Blue-grey mouse

Conservation status
- Extinct (1956) (IUCN 3.1)

Scientific classification
- Kingdom: Animalia
- Phylum: Chordata
- Class: Mammalia
- Order: Rodentia
- Family: Muridae
- Genus: Pseudomys
- Species: †P. glaucus

Binomial name
- †Pseudomys glaucus Thomas, 1910

Species of rodent

The blue-gray mouse (Pseudomys glaucus) is an Australian rodent species that is only known by a few specimens found in Eastern Australia, and since presumed to have become extinct.

== Taxonomy ==
The species was described by Oldfield Thomas in 1910. The number of specimens identified as Pseudomys glaucus is limited to three, two found in the northeastern state of Queensland and a single specimen collected to the south at Cryon in New South Wales.

== Description ==
A species of Pseudomys, these Australian rodents resembled the familiar house mouse (Mus musculus). The body of P. glaucus was robust with fine and dense fur, white at the underside and a pale blue-grey colour over the upperparts of the fur. The measurement of each of the three known specimens was 95 millimetres for the head and body combined, with a white-haired tail that was slightly longer (100 mm.) The weight range was 25 to 30 grams.
