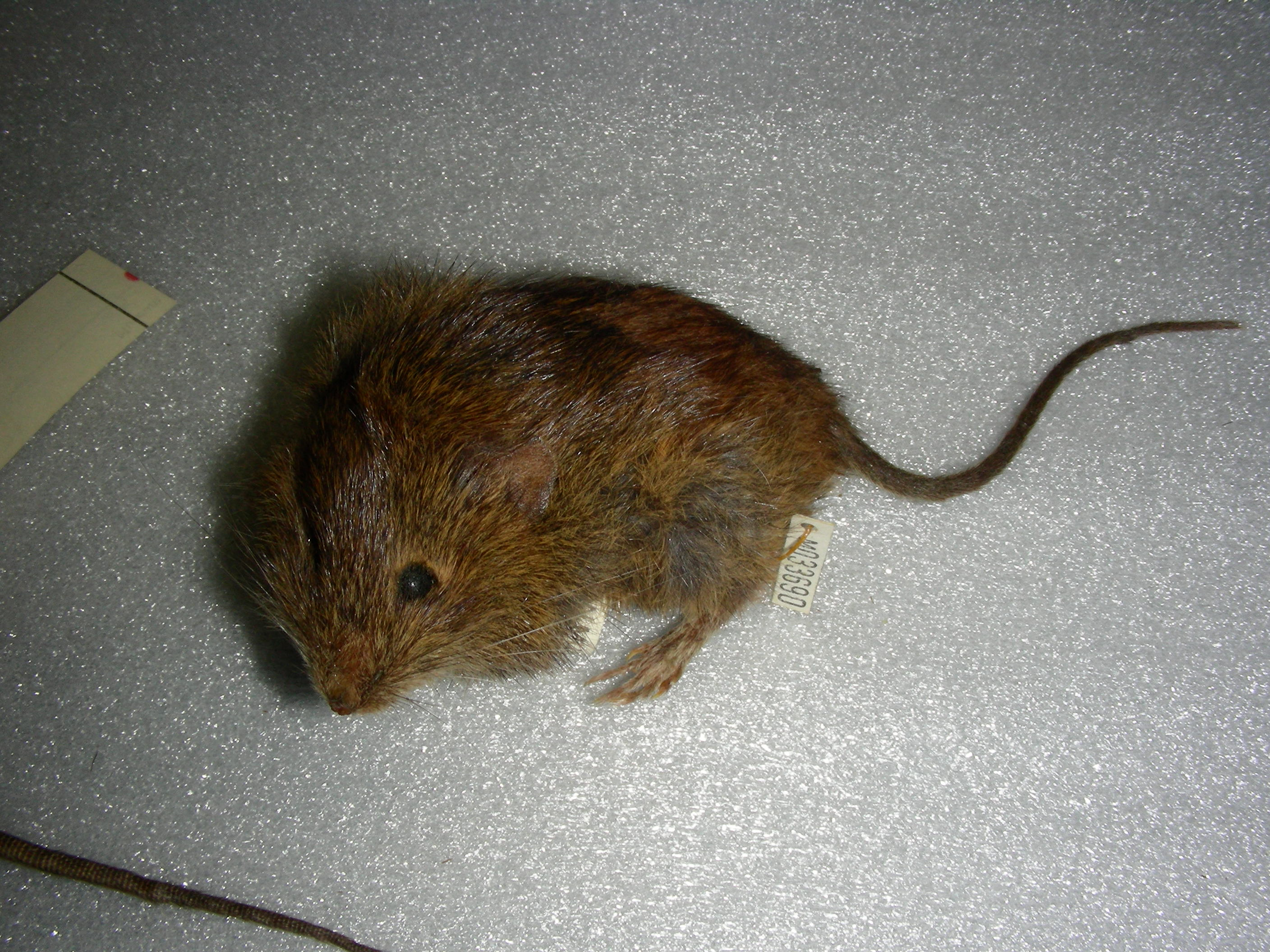

Conservation status
- Least Concern (IUCN 3.1)

Scientific classification
- Kingdom: Animalia
- Phylum: Chordata
- Class: Mammalia
- Order: Rodentia
- Family: Muridae
- Genus: Pseudomys
- Species: P. gracilicaudatus

Binomial name
- Pseudomys gracilicaudatus (Gould, 1845)

= Eastern chestnut mouse =

Species of rodent

The eastern chestnut mouse (Pseudomys gracilicaudatus) is a species of rodent in the family Muridae. It is found only in Australia, along the eastern coast from northern Queensland and into New South Wales as far as Jervis Bay.
