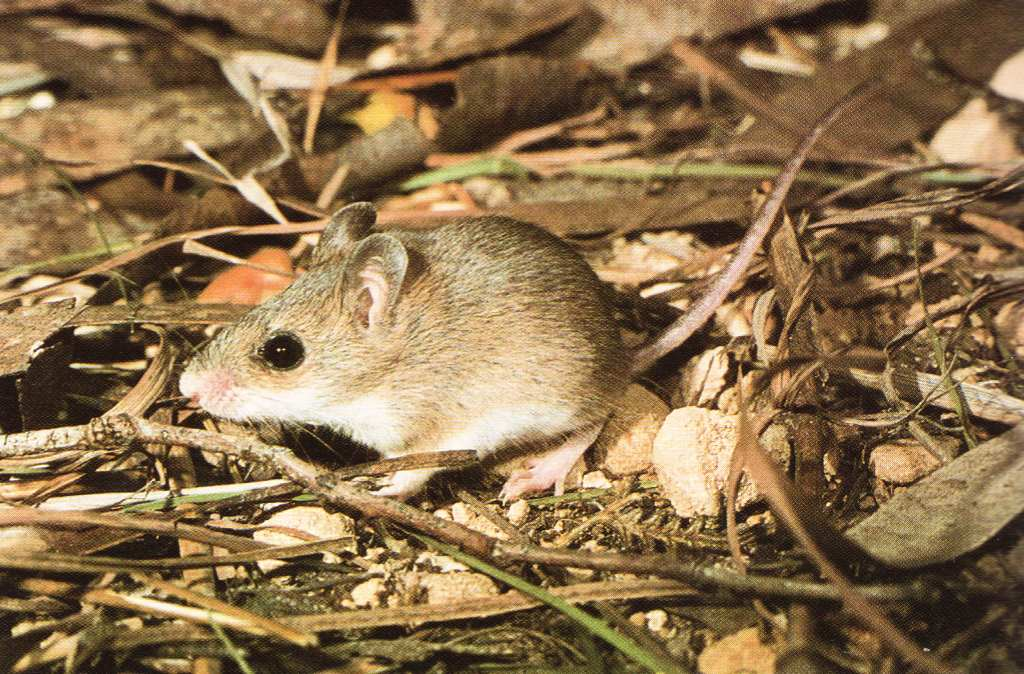

Conservation status
- Least Concern (IUCN 3.1)

Scientific classification
- Kingdom: Animalia
- Phylum: Chordata
- Class: Mammalia
- Order: Rodentia
- Family: Muridae
- Genus: Pseudomys
- Species: P. delicatulus

Binomial name
- Pseudomys delicatulus (Gould, 1842)

= Little native mouse =

Species of mammal

The little native mouse (Pseudomys delicatulus), also known as the delicate mouse, is a species of rodent in the family Muridae. The Kunwinjku people of western Arnhem Land call this little creature kijbuk.

It is found in Australia in Western Australia, the Northern Territory, Queensland, and New South Wales and in Papua New Guinea.

== Taxonomy ==
In 2024, genetic study revealed that delicate mouse populations actually belong to not one, but three different species. In the announcement paper Emily Roycroft et al. proposed names based on the rodents' geographic distribution: the western delicate mouse or the Pilbara delicate mouse, the eastern delicate mouse and the northern delicate mouse.

== Description and behaviour ==
The little native mouse has fur that is yellow-brown to grey-brown above and white underneath. It is the smallest of all Australian native mice with a head and body length of 55–75 mm (2.2–3.0 in) with adults of both sexes being roughly the same in size, weight (6–15 g (0.21–0.53 oz)) and colour. In Arnhem Land, the only place the species has been studied at length, breeding takes place in July and August. Two to four young are born in a grass-lined nesting chamber after a gestation of 28–31 days. At birth the eyes are shut and the ears tightly folded back, they develop quickly and are independent of the mother around four weeks of age.

== Habitat ==
The species is found in sandy, well drained, sparsely covered savanna. The animal lives in hollow logs, under pieces of bark, or in burrows, the design of which varies with local conditions: in hard granite sand ridges the burrow is shallow, intricately constructed retreats with many false passages and one main nesting chamber; in sandy conditions the burrows are deep simple structures around two metres long and with only one main chamber. It occasionally excavates burrows in termite mounds.

== Diet ==
Grass seeds from native grasses comprise most of their diet.
