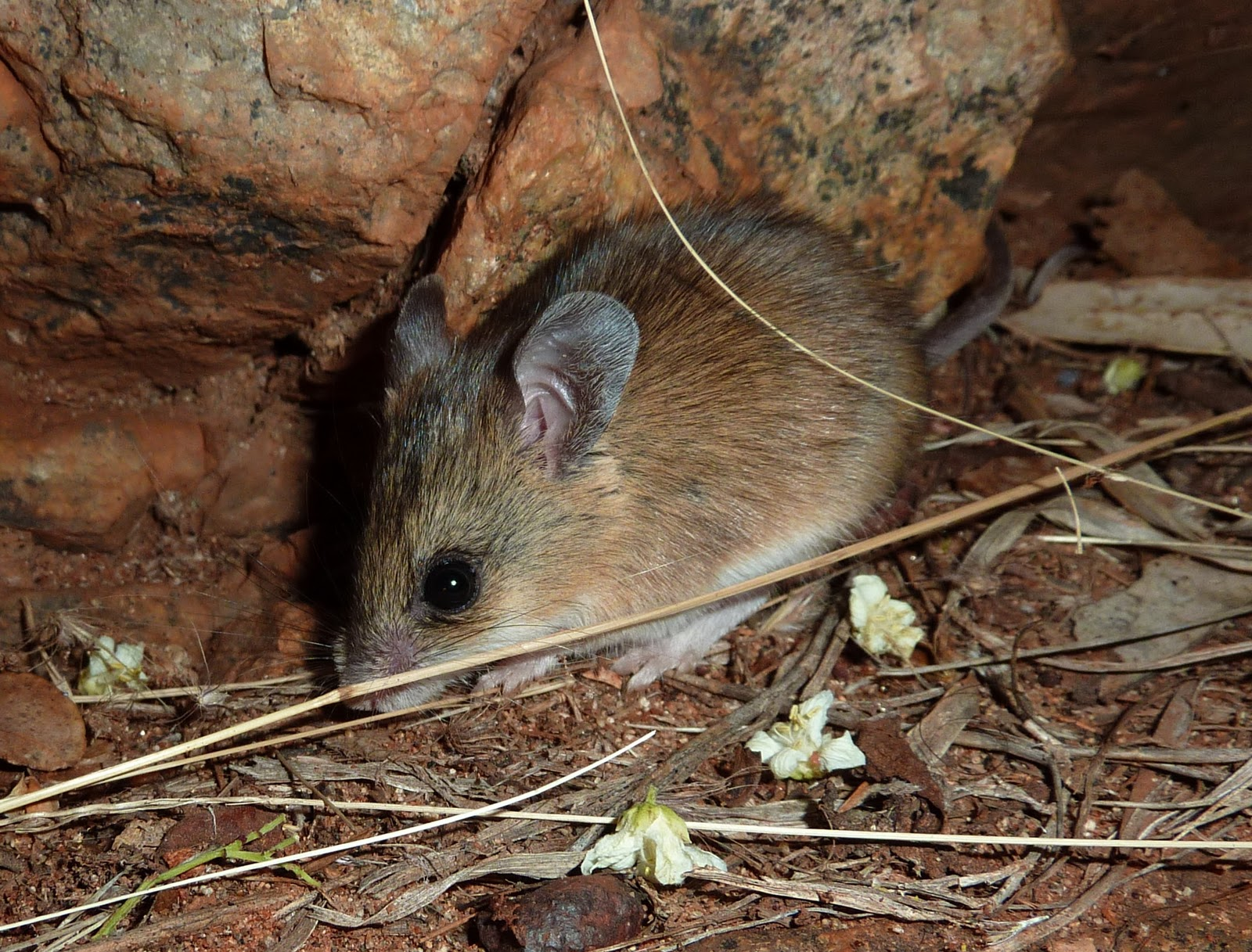
- Sandy inland mouse (Pseudomys hermannsburgensis)

Scientific classification
- Kingdom: Animalia
- Phylum: Chordata
- Class: Mammalia
- Order: Rodentia
- Family: Muridae
- Tribe: Hydromyini
- Genus: Pseudomys; Gray, 1832

Type species
- Pseudomys australis

Species
- Pseudomys albocinereus Pseudomys apodemoides Pseudomys australis Pseudomys bolami Pseudomys calabyi Pseudomys chapmani Pseudomys delicatulus Pseudomys desertor Pseudomys fumeus Pseudomys glaucus †; Pseudomys gouldii Pseudomys gracilicaudatus Pseudomys hermannsburgensis Pseudomys higginsi Pseudomys johnsoni Pseudomys laborifex Pseudomys nanus Pseudomys novaehollandiae Pseudomys occidentalis Pseudomys oralis Pseudomys patrius Pseudomys pilligaensis Pseudomys shortridgei Pseudomys vandycki †

= Pseudomys =

Pseudomys Temporal range: Late Miocene - Recent

Genus of rodents

Pseudomys is a genus of rodent that contains a wide variety of mice native to Australia and New Guinea. They are among the few terrestrial placental mammals that colonised Australia without human intervention.

== Natural history ==
This genus contains a number of species with different habits making generalisation difficult. The overall body size varies widely, ranging from 60 to 160 mm. The tail is 60–180 mm and the weight is recorded from 12 to 90 g. They inhabit a wide variety of habitats from rainforests to plains and grasslands. The animals are nocturnal and spend the day in burrows. Food also varies with some species eating seeds, roots and insects while others feed primarily on grasses. The pebble-mound mice are unique in creating mounds of stones around their burrows. Several species of Pseudomys are threatened due to competition with introduced species and habitat destruction. Several others are probably extinct.

== Etymology ==
The name Pseudomys means "false mouse" presumably in reference to both its similarity and uniqueness from "true mice" in the genus Mus.

== Species ==
Genus Pseudomys - Australian native mice

- Ash-grey mouse, Pseudomys albocinereus
- Silky mouse, Pseudomys apodemoides
- Plains rat, Pseudomys australis
- Bolam's mouse, Pseudomys bolami
- Kakadu pebble-mound mouse, Pseudomys calabyi
- Western pebble-mound mouse, Pseudomys chapmani
- Little native mouse, Pseudomys delicatulus
- Desert mouse, Pseudomys desertor
- Smoky mouse, Pseudomys fumeus
- Blue-gray mouse, Pseudomys glaucus †
- Gould's mouse, Pseudomys gouldii
  - The Shark Bay mouse was previously described as a separate species Pseudomys fieldi, but is now considered conspecific with P. gouldii
- Eastern chestnut mouse, Pseudomys gracilicaudatus
- Sandy inland mouse, Pseudomys hermannsburgensis
- Long-tailed mouse, Pseudomys higginsi
- Central pebble-mound mouse, Pseudomys johnsoni
  - The Kimberley mouse was previously described as a separate species Pseudomys laborifex, but is now considered conspecific with Pseudomys johnsoni
- Western chestnut mouse, Pseudomys nanus
- New Holland mouse, Pseudomys novaehollandiae
- Western mouse, Pseudomys occidentalis
- Hastings River mouse, Pseudomys oralis
- Country mouse, Pseudomys patrius
- Pilliga mouse, Pseudomys pilligaensis
- Heath mouse, Pseudomys shortridgei
- Pseudomys vandycki † (Late Pliocene of Australia)
