= Western chestnut mouse =

Conservation status
- Least Concern (IUCN 3.1)

Scientific classification
- Kingdom: Animalia
- Phylum: Chordata
- Class: Mammalia
- Order: Rodentia
- Family: Muridae
- Genus: Pseudomys
- Species: P. nanus

Binomial name
- Pseudomys nanus (Gould, 1858)

Species of rodent

The western chestnut mouse (Pseudomys nanus) is a species of rodent in the family Muridae. It is native to northern Australia and various close islands, with the vast majority found in Queensland and the Northern Territory.

== Ecology ==
P. nanus inhabits grasslands and open stands of eucalypt on sandy soil. It is mainly nocturnal and spends the day in a grass nest. Its diet is mostly made up of native grasses and seeds. Breeding occurs most often during the wet season, but the species may breed throughout the year under favourable conditions. Females give birth to between three and five young, after a gestation period of 22–24 days. Fully grown adult mice weigh around 70 g (2.5 oz) and have an average body length of 10 cm (3.9 in).

Studies in 1999 showed that the species has an excellent capacity for repleting glycogen following exertion, even if they do not eat.

== Threats ==
Populations of western chestnut mouse in the Northern Territory have declined substantially since European colonisation of Australia, with one study identifying a 24% reduction in the extent of occurrence and a 25% reduction in the breadth of occupied environmental space. A significant contraction towards areas of higher rainfall and higher vegetation cover was observed, which are likely refuge habitats that help to buffer the impacts of feral cat predation.
