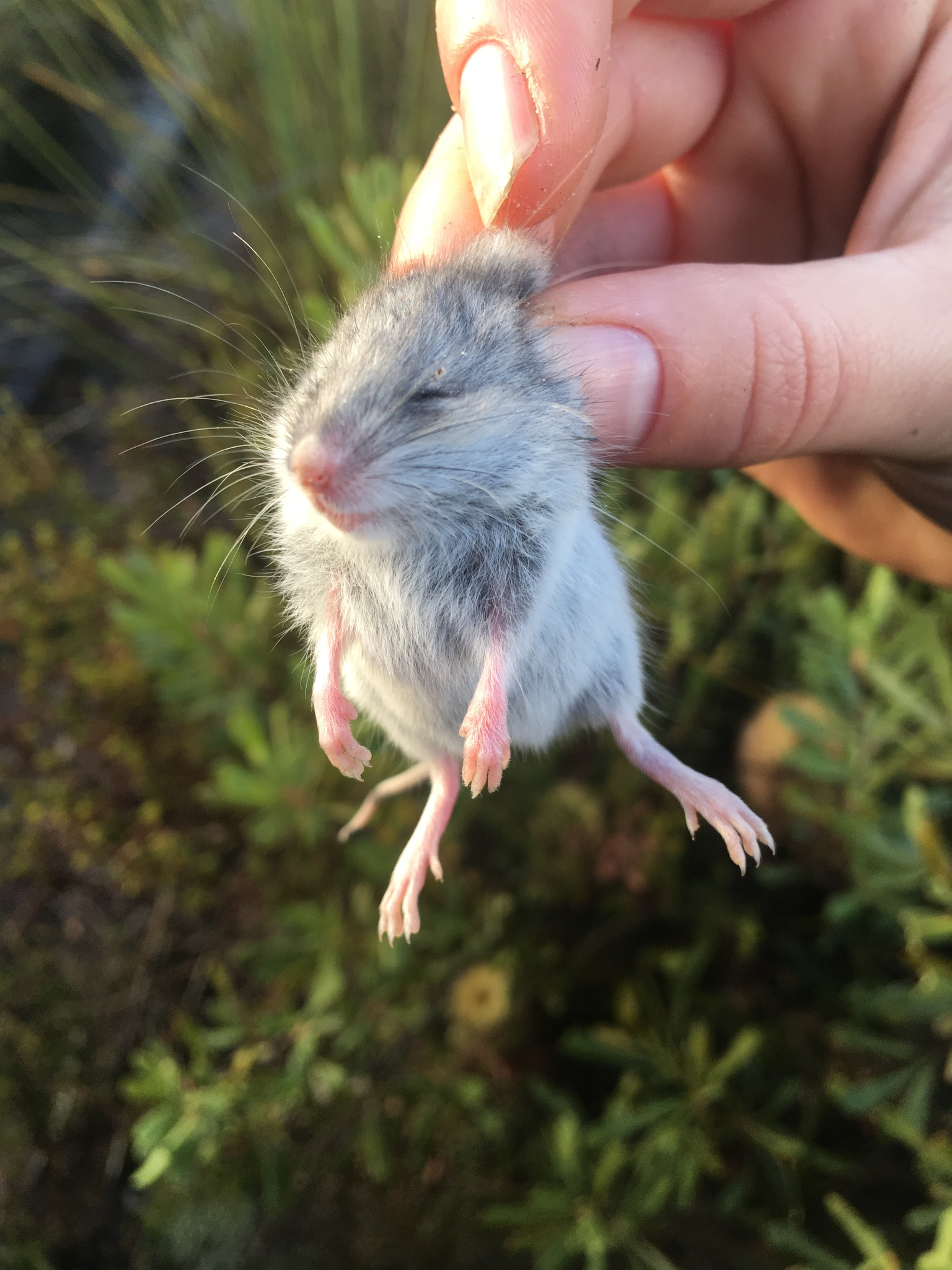

Conservation status
- Least Concern (IUCN 3.1)

Scientific classification
- Kingdom: Animalia
- Phylum: Chordata
- Class: Mammalia
- Infraclass: Placentalia
- Order: Rodentia
- Family: Muridae
- Genus: Pseudomys
- Species: P. apodemoides

Binomial name
- Pseudomys apodemoides Finlayson, 1932
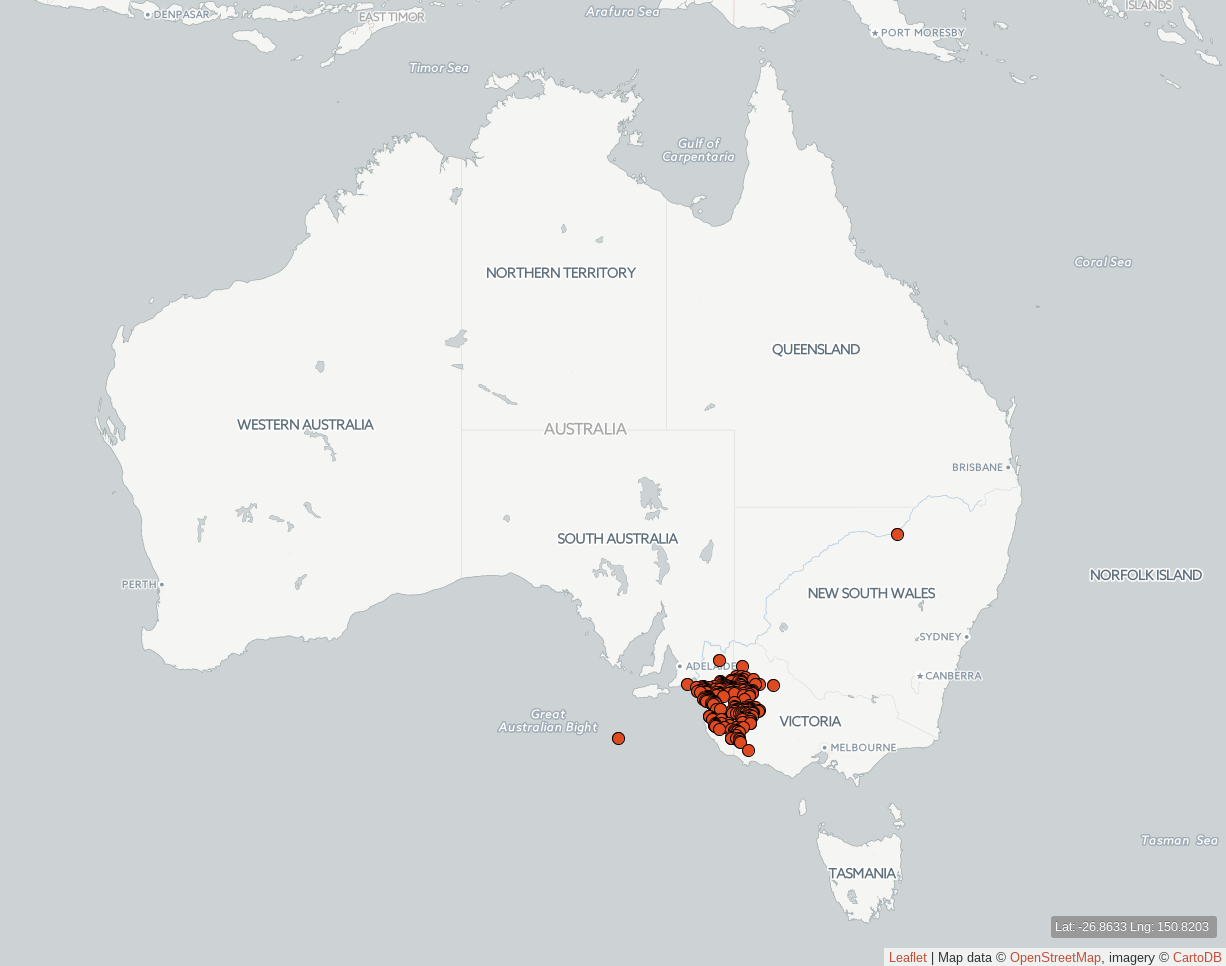
- Recorded locations of the silky mouse

= Silky mouse =

Species of rodent

The silky mouse (Pseudomys apodemoides) is a small, nocturnal rodent native to the western and northwestern regions of Victoria, Australia. Weighing 16-22 grams, it has light blue-grey fur flecked with light brown and black guard hairs, and a white underside. Known for its complex burrows, the Silky Mouse favors floristically rich mallee-heath environments, especially areas near Banksia ornata, due to consistent soil moisture and food availability. The silky mouse primarily feeds on seeds, nectar, flowers, and insects. Though threatened by habitat destruction and fires, conservation efforts have led to population recovery.

== Description ==
The silky mouse is a nocturnal burrowing rodent found only in Australia. Adults weigh between 16-22 grams, with a head and body length of 65-80 millimeters and a tail length of 90-110 millimeters. They have light blue-grey fur flecked with light brown on their backs, interspersed with black guard hairs, and white fur on their undersides. The tail has pink skin with white hairs and often features ten to fifteen grey-brown bands. P. apodemoides has prominent, bulging eyes and larger ears than the house mouse (Mus musculus). The silky mouse has very soft, fine fur and well-developed black or white whiskers. Other common names include silky-grey mouse, silky-grey southern mouse, Finlayson's mouse

== Taxonomy ==
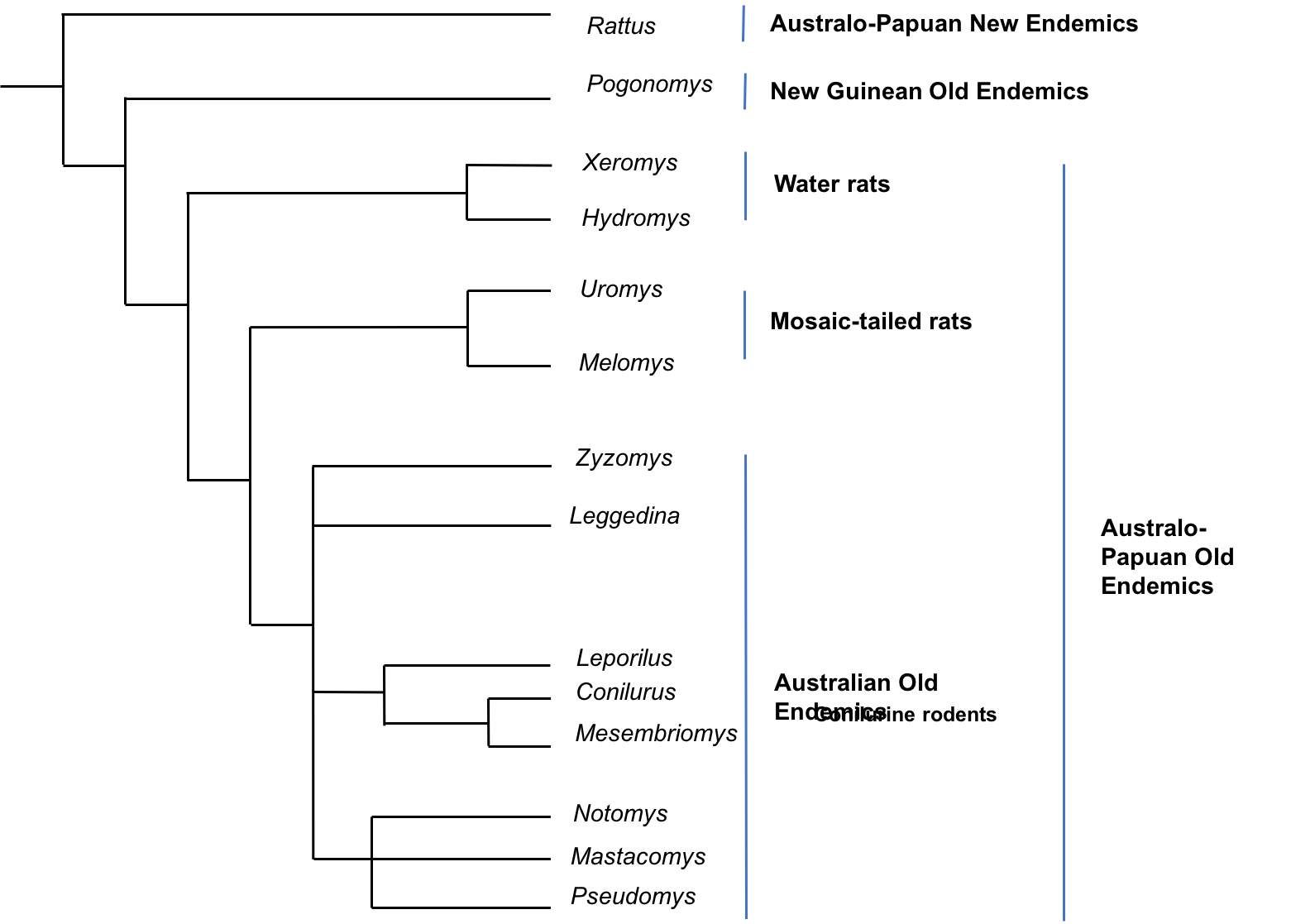
Rodents of the subfamily Murinae

The silky mouse belongs to the family Muridae, a diverse group of mammals classified under the phylum Chordata and class Mammalia. Within the order Rodentia, it is part of the subfamily Murinae, which includes Old World rats and mice. Specifically, Pseudomys apodemoides is classified under the tribe Hydromyini, known for rodents primarily found in Australasia. From the Early Pliocene, rodents of the Hydromyini tribe migrated from New Guinea to Australia through multiple colonization events, facilitated by geological changes and land connections. Today, the Pseudomys division, encompassing Pseudomys apodemoides along with 40 other species across genera such as Leggadina, Mastacomys, Notomys, Pseudomys, and Zyzomys, dominates the Australian rodent fauna. Pseudomys apodemoides, recognized as part of the Victorian fauna since 1963, exemplifies the adaptation of these rodents to diverse ecological niches within Australia, highlighting their evolutionary success in this unique region.

== Habitat ==
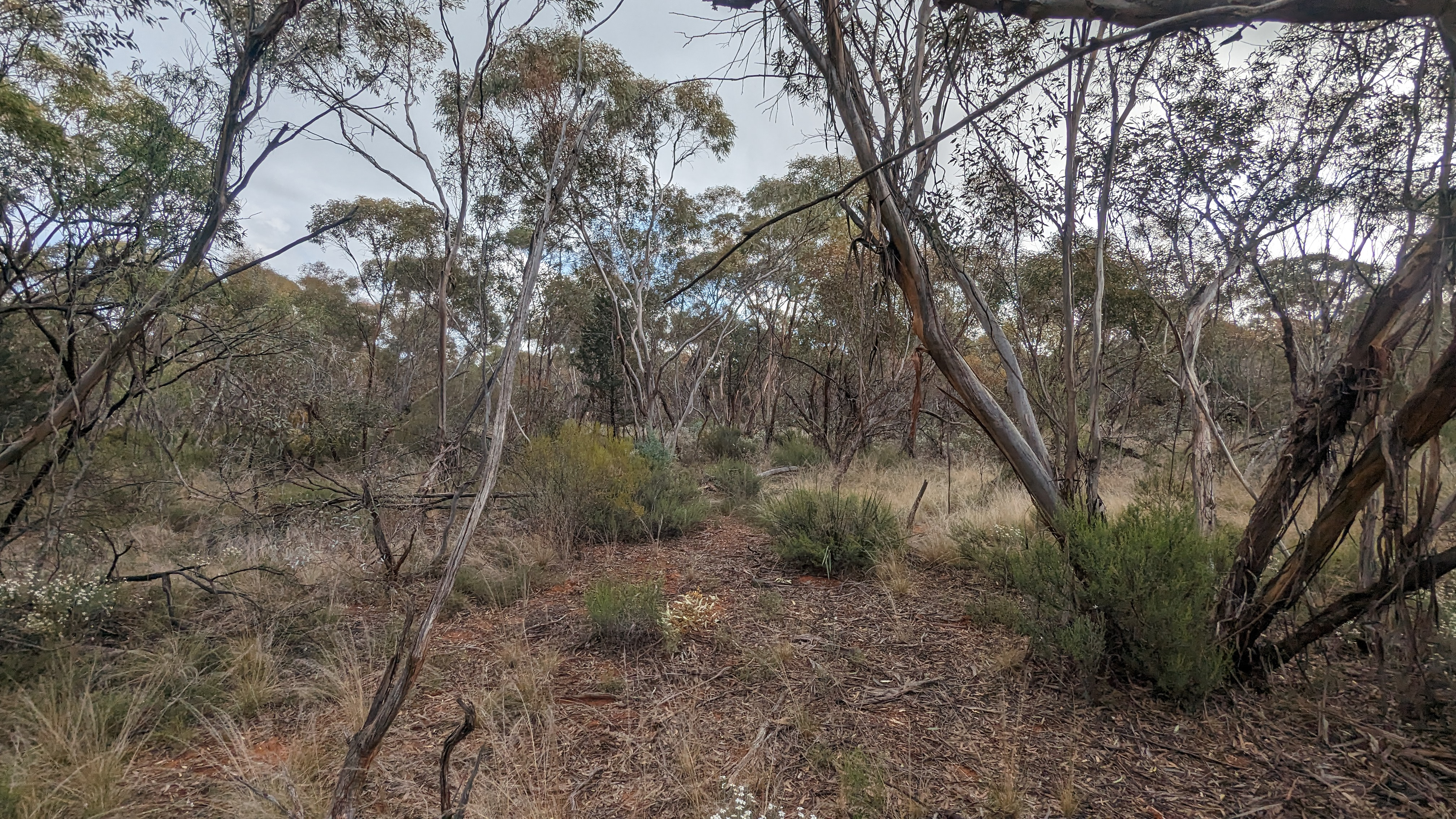
An example of mallee environment, preferred by the silky mouse

Pseudomys apodemoides prefers floristically rich mallee-heath environments, which provide cover from predators, moderate temperatures, and increased environmental moisture, creating microhabitats for insect species that are part of its diet. The silky mouse often builds burrows near Banksia ornata due to the soil moisture benefits it offers. Banksia ornata significantly impacts its habitat by intercepting a large portion of rainfall with its dense foliage, creating an irregular pattern of soil moisture. Despite some evaporation, much of the intercepted rain reaches the soil, resulting in a more consistent moisture level compared to other vegetation types. Marked stem-flow in B. ornata leads to rain-shadows and concentrated moisture under the bush, providing a stable moisture environment throughout much of the year. This preference for B. ornata not only ensures a more consistent moisture level but also supports the availability of food sources, making it an ideal burrow site for P. apodemoides.

Silky mice are found throughout western and northwestern Victoria.

== Behavior and ecology ==
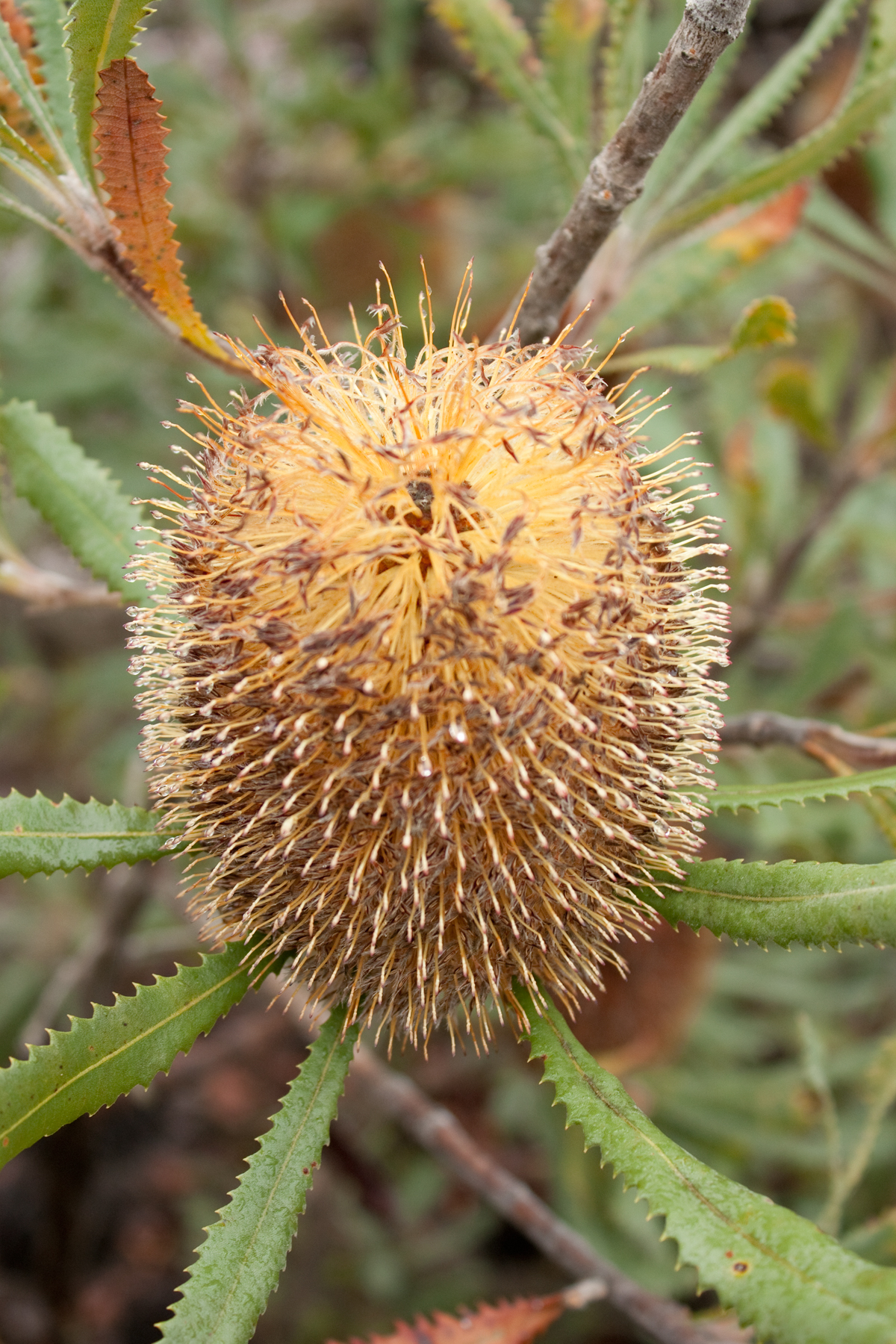
Banksia ornata, which this species is usually found near

Pseudomys apodemoides is nocturnal, resting in their burrows during the day and foraging for seeds, nectar, flowers, and fruit at night. They also consume insects, particularly during breeding periods and pregnancy. Burrows are identified by excavation mounds of deeper soil, have clean, vertical pop-holes, and comprise several vertical shafts, a long tunnel system, and a large nesting chamber. Burrows are often near Banksia ornata due to soil moisture benefits and food availability.

== Reproduction ==
The silky mouse can breed throughout the year when conditions are optimal, producing two to five young per litter. Breeding may become seasonal and is linked to plant productivity, with increased breeding behavior observed when Banksia ornata nectar is in bloom in late autumn and winter (Cockburn, 1981). Females in the breeding season often have copulatory plugs, which prevent remating and aid in ejaculate transport and pregnancy;.

Gestation lasts 38–39 days in non-suckling females and is likely longer in suckling females. Litter size ranges from 1 to 6, with young weaned at 40 days. The oestrus cycle is 7 days, with a post-partum oestrus. Matings start in mid-April and likely continue until August, producing up to three litters per season. Longevity is three years, with individuals breeding over two years and multiple litters can be reared in a season.

== Dental identification ==
Rodents have characteristic incisors that are recurved and ever-growing, with enamel on the front and dentine on the back. They lack canines and often premolars, with molars adapted for grinding. Muridae family rodents are distinguished by molar cusp morphology, typically having three upper and lower molars. The subfamily Murinae, including Australian rodents, have specific molar cusp patterns and closed roots. Pseudomys species are unspecialized, arid-adapted, and widespread in Australia.

== Predators and Competition ==
Potential predators include dogs, foxes, and brown snakes. P. apodemoides competes with ants for seeds, as seed consumption is highest when ant activity is maximal. Predators also include owls, snakes, foxes, cats, and predatory birds such as owls.

== Conservation status ==
Pseudomys apodemoides is not currently considered endangered but is listed as threatened due to its specific habitat requirements. Environmental legislation such as the Threatened Species Conservation Act (1995), the Environmental Protection and Biodiversity Conservation Act (1999), and the National Parks and Wildlife Act (1974) aim to preserve the species. Major threats include habitat destruction from human activities and damage to regional flora due to fires. However, the population has been on the rebound due to effective conservation efforts.
