= Mammals of Australia =

The mammals of Australia have a rich fossil history, as well as a variety of extant mammalian species, dominated by the marsupials, but also including monotremes and placentals. Of the three mammal subclasses, monotremes, marsupials, and placentals, Australia is one of the only countries home to all three. The marsupials evolved to fill specific ecological niches, and in many cases they are physically similar to the placental mammals in Eurasia and North America that occupy similar niches, a phenomenon known as convergent evolution. For example, the top mammalian predators in Australia, the Tasmanian tiger and the marsupial lion, bore a striking resemblance to large canids such as the gray wolf and large cats respectively; gliding possums and flying squirrels have similar adaptations enabling their arboreal lifestyle; and the numbat and anteaters are both digging insectivores. Most of Australia's mammals are herbivores or omnivores.

== Evolutionary history ==
The fossil record shows that monotremes have been present in Australia since the Early Cretaceous 145 to 99 million years ago (mya). Studies on their ancestral amniote features and genome show that the monotremes diverged from different mammal groups around the Triassic-Jurassic period, 200 million years ago.

Marsupials probably existed in Australia at least from the early Paleocene (64 to 65 mya), although the earliest unequivocal fossils of Australian marsupials are from the late Oligocene – 25 mya.

Indisputable remains of Australian placental mammals start from the Miocene, when Australia moved closer to Indonesia. After 15 mya bats appear reliably in the fossil record, with rodents appearing after 5 to 10 mya. The subsequent introductions of placental mammals into Australian fauna occurred about 1 mya (rats), 40,000 years ago (homo sapiens), several thousand years ago (dingoes, introduced by humans), and 200 years ago from European colonization (many species).

Some claims have been made about placental mammal fossils from the Eocene, called Tingamarra. These claims are based on fossils from the Murgon fossil site: the first find was a single tooth, which has some characteristic features of condylarthra, and later an ankle bone and an ear bone. Both the age and placental nature of these fossils have been challenged by other researchers.

== Monotremes and marsupials ==
Monotremes are mammals with a unique method of reproduction: they lay eggs instead of giving birth to live young. Two of the five known living species of monotreme occur in Australia: the platypus and the short-beaked echidna. The platypus — a venomous, egg-laying, duck-billed, amphibious mammal — is one of the strangest creatures in the animal kingdom. When a platypus pelt was first presented by Joseph Banks to English naturalists in the late 18th century, they were convinced it must be a cleverly created hoax. Another strange monotreme is the short-beaked echidna; covered in hairy spikes, with a tubular snout in the place of a mouth, it has a tongue that can move in and out of the snout about 100 times per minute to capture termites.

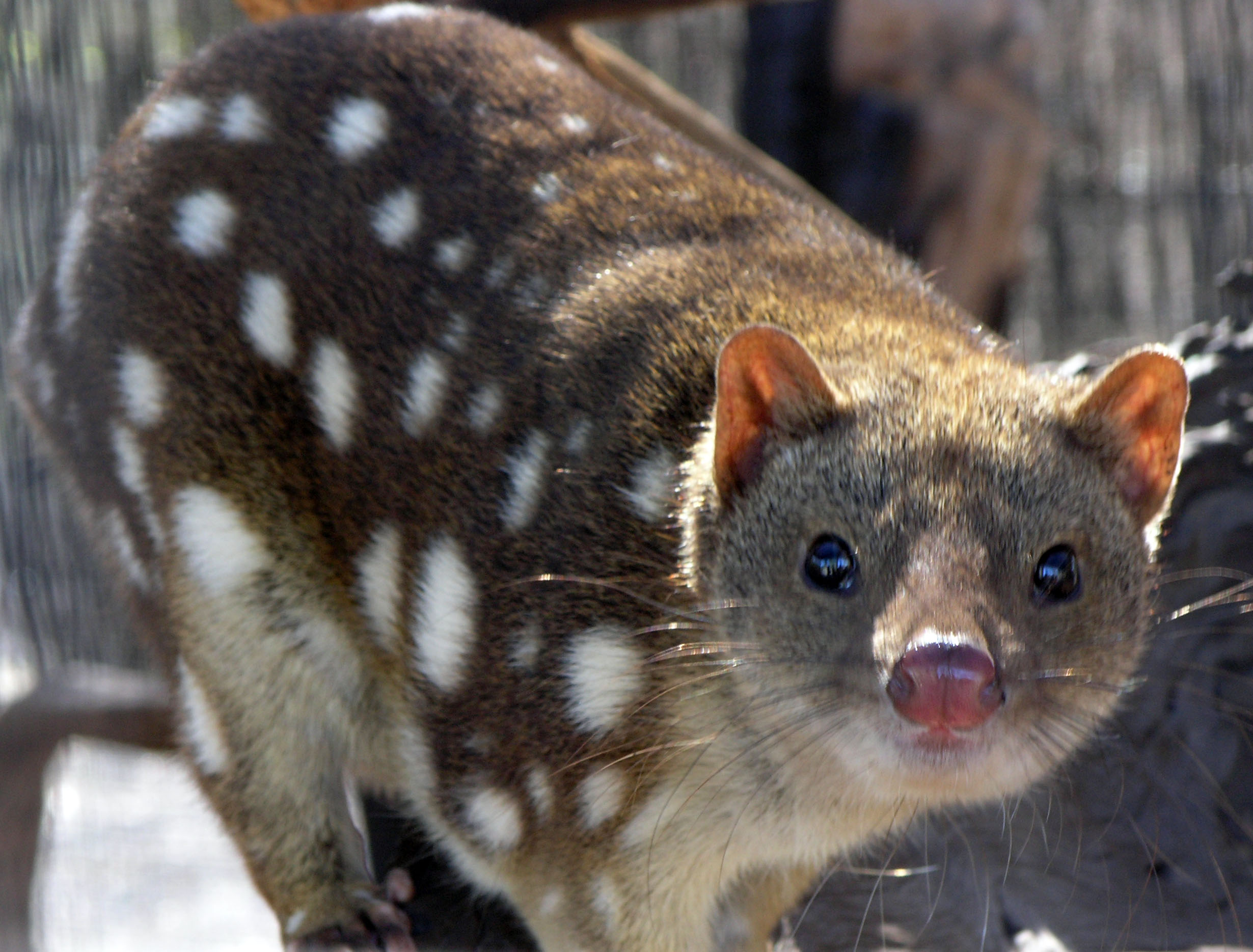
The tiger quoll is mainland Australia's largest carnivorous marsupial and an endangered species.

Australia is also home to the world's largest and most diverse selection of marsupials: mammals with a pouch in which they rear their young. The marsupial carnivores — order Dasyuromorphia — are represented by two surviving families: the Dasyuridae with 51 members, and the Myrmecobiidae with the numbat as its sole surviving member.

The thylacine, or Tasmanian tiger, was the largest Dasyuromorphia and the last living specimen of the family Thylacinidae; however, the last known specimen died in captivity in 1936. The world's largest surviving carnivorous marsupial is the Tasmanian devil; it is the size of a small dog and hunts although it is opportunistic. It became extinct on the mainland some 600 years ago and is now found only in Tasmania. There are four species of quoll, or native cats, all of which are threatened species. The remainder of the Dasyuridae are referred to as "marsupial mice"; most weigh less than 100 grams (3 1/2 oz). There are two species of marsupial mole — order Notoryctemorphia — that inhabit the deserts of Western Australia. These rare, blind, earless carnivores spend most of their time underground; little is known about them.

The marsupial omnivores include the bandicoots and bilbies, order Peramelemorphia. There are seven species in Australia, most of which are endangered. These small creatures share several characteristic physical features: a plump, arch-backed body with a long, delicately tapering snout, large upright ears, long thin legs, and a thin tail. The evolutionary origin of this group is unclear, but they share characteristics from both carnivorous and herbivorous marsupials.

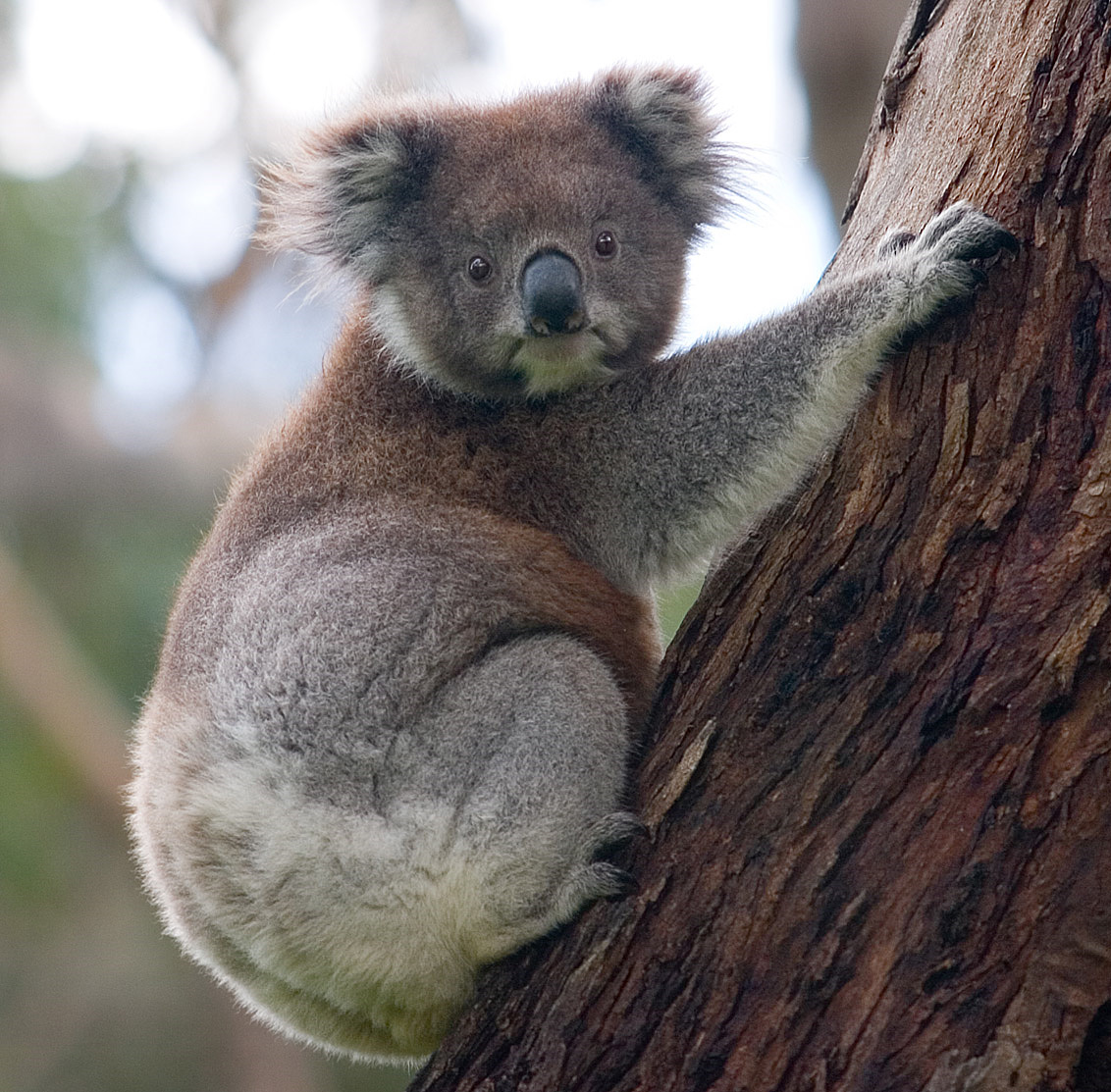
The koala does not normally need to drink because it can obtain all of the moisture it needs by eating leaves.

The marsupial herbivores are classified in the order Diprotodontia, and further into the suborders Vombatiformes, Phalangeriformes and Macropodiformes. The Vombatiformes include the koala and the three species of wombat. One of Australia's best-known marsupials, the koala is an arboreal (tree-dwelling) species that feeds on the leaves of some 120 species of eucalyptus. Wombats, on the other hand, live on the ground and feed on grasses, sedges and roots. Wombats use their rodent-like front teeth and powerful claws to dig extensive burrow systems; they are mainly crepuscular and nocturnal. Wombats are also well known for their backwards facing pouches. Also among this group is the marsupial lion, which went extinct after the arrival of aboriginals, and was one of the few carnivorous vombatiforms.

The Phalangeriformes includes possums and is a diverse group of arboreal marsupials, including six families and 26 species. They vary in size from the pygmy possum, weighing just 7 grams (1/4 oz), to the cat-sized common ringtail and brushtail possums. The sugar and squirrel gliders are common species of gliding possum, found in the eucalyptus forests of eastern Australia, while the feathertail glider is the smallest glider species. The gliding possums have membranes, called "patagia", that extend from the fifth finger of their forelimb back to the first toe of their hind foot. These membranes, when outstretched, allow them to glide between trees.

The Macropodiformes are divided into three families that are found in all Australian environments except alpine areas: the Hypsiprymnodontidae, with the musky rat-kangaroo as its only member; the Potoroidae, with 10 species; and the Macropodidae which had 53 members in Australia, but some species are extinct. The Potoroidae include the bettongs, potaroos and rat-kangaroos, small species that make nests and carry plant material with their tails. The Macropodidae include kangaroos, wallabies and associated species; size varies widely within this family. Most macropods move in a bipedal, energy-efficient hopping motion. They have powerfully muscled tails and large hind legs with long narrow hind feet. The hind feet have a distinctive arrangement of four toes, while the short front legs have five separate digits. The musky rat-kangaroo is the smallest macropod and the only species that is not bipedal, while the male red kangaroo is the largest, reaching a height of about 2 metres (6 ft 7 in) and weighing up to 85 kilograms (187 lb).

== Placental mammals ==
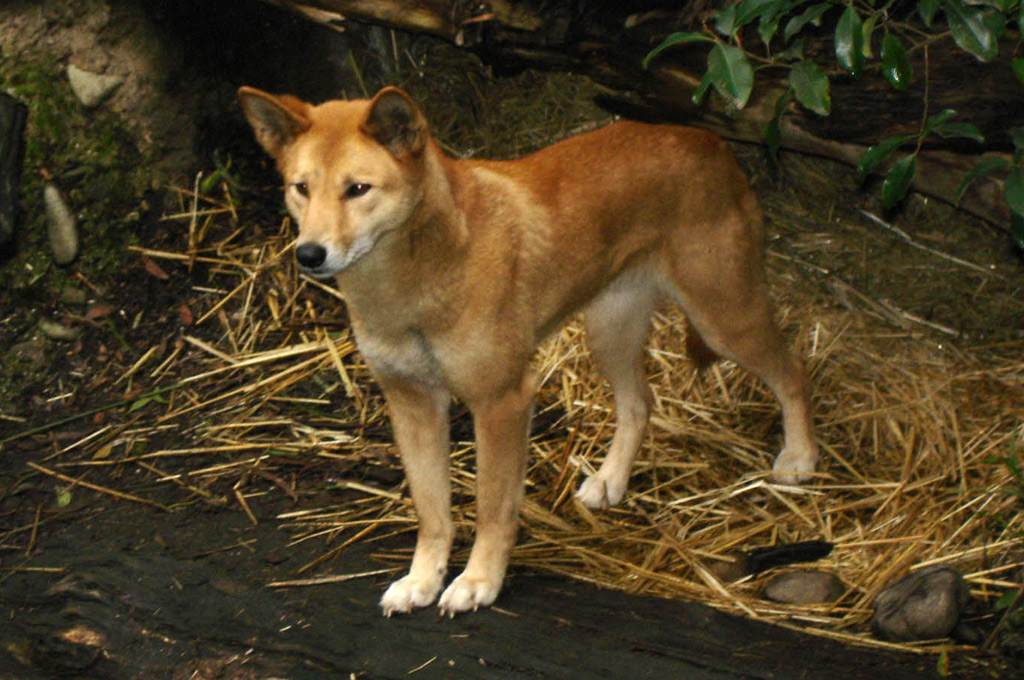
The dingo was the first placental mammal introduced to Australia by humans.

Australia has indigenous placental mammals from two orders: the bats, order Chiroptera, represented by six families, and the mice and rats, order Rodentia, family Muridae. Bats and rodents are relatively recent arrivals to Australia. Bats probably arrived from Asia, and they are present in the fossil record only from as recently as 15 mya. Although 7% of the world's bats species live in Australia, there are only two endemic genera of bats. Rodents first arrived in Australia 5 to 10 mya and underwent a wide radiation to produce the species collectively known as the "old endemics". The old endemics are represented by 14 extant genera. About a million years ago, the rat entered Australia from New Guinea and evolved into seven species of Rattus, collectively called the "new endemics".

Since human settlement, many placental mammals have been introduced to Australia and are now feral. The first was the dingo; fossil evidence suggests that people from the north brought the dingo to Australia about 5,000 years ago. When Europeans settled Australia they intentionally released many species into the wild, including the red fox, brown hare, and the European rabbit. Other domestic species have escaped and over time have produced wild populations, including the cat, fallow deer, rusa deer, chital, sambar, domestic horse, donkey, pig, domestic goat, water buffalo, and dromedary. Only three species of Australia's non-indigenous placental mammals were not deliberately introduced: the house mouse, black rat and brown rat.

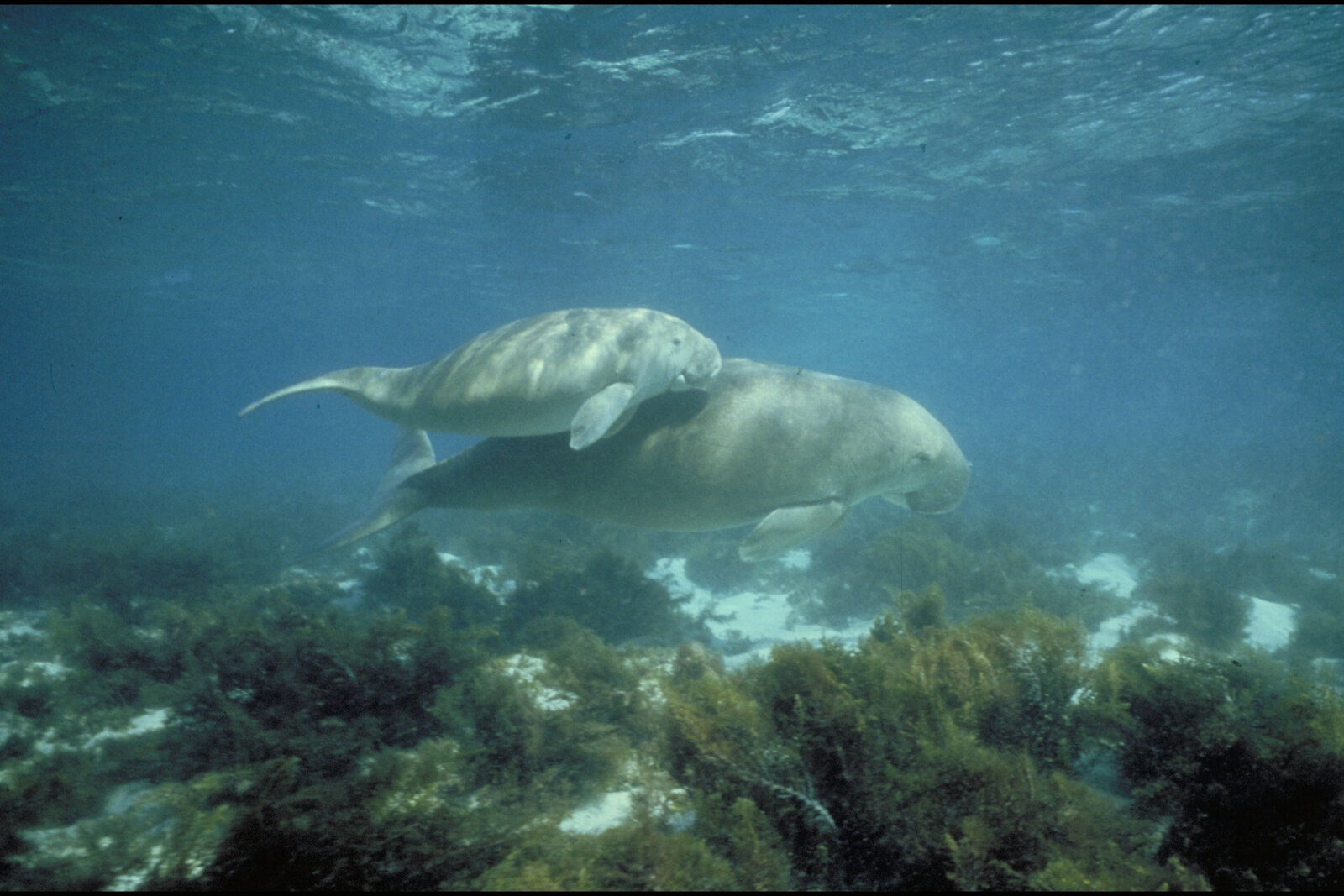
Australian waters are home to the endangered dugong.

Forty-six species of marine mammals from the infraorder Cetacea are found in Australian coastal waters, but since many of these species have a global distribution, some authors do not consider them Australian species. There are nine species of baleen whale, including the enormous humpback whales and southern right whales. Dwarf minke whales are common off Great Barrier Reef in winter. There are 37 species of toothed whale, which include all six genera of the family Ziphiidae (beaked whales), and 21 species of oceanic dolphin, including the Australian snubfin dolphin, a species first described in 2005 that is endemic to Australia. Some oceanic dolphins, such as the orca, can be found in all waters around the continent; others, such as the Irrawaddy dolphin, are confined to the warm northern waters. The dugong (order Sirenia) is an endangered marine species that inhabits the waters of northeastern and northwestern Australia, particularly the Torres Strait. It can grow up to 3 metres (9.8 ft) long and weigh as much as 400 kilograms (880 lb). The dugong is the only herbivorous marine mammal in Australia, feeding on sea grass in coastal areas.

Ten species of seals and sea lions (parvorder Pinnipedia) live off the southern Australian coast and in Sub-Antarctic Australian territories.

== Conserving Australian Mammals ==
The distinctive nature of Australia's mammalian fauna, with a high rate of endemism, underscores the global significance of these conservation efforts. Key strategies include the creation of Safe Havens or predator-free areas providing a refuge from predators such as cats and foxes, which are responsible for the decline of many native species. Habitat Protection and Restoration. Conservation efforts focus on managing national parks, reserves, and private conservation areas to support the natural ecosystems required by various species. This includes activities like reforestation, erosion control, and management of fire regimes to ensure habitats remain suitable for their mammalian inhabitants. Captive breeding, translocation, and reintroduction aimed to bolster wild populations and are often supported by extensive research into the biology and ecology of the species to optimize their chances of survival.

Given the dynamic nature of ecosystems and the ongoing challenges such as climate change, conservation strategies must be adaptable. This involves regularly assessing the effectiveness of conservation actions and being willing to modify approaches based on new scientific findings and changing environmental conditions.

== Field Guides and books ==
- Leonard Cronin with Marion Westmacot (illustrations), Key Guide to Australian Mammals, Reed Books, Sydney, 1991, 190 pages, ISBN 978-0-7301-0355-4.
- Pat Slater (text), and Steve Parish, Jiri Lochman, Michael Morcombe, Stanley Breeden, Ian Morris (photography), First Field Guide to Australian Mammals, Search and Learn, Steve Parish Publishing, Fortitude Valley, 1997, 56 pages. ISBN 978-1-875932-53-5.
- Ronald Strahan and Steve Van Dyck, The Mammals of Australia, Reed New Holland, Sydney, Third Edition, 2008, 887 pages. ISBN 978-1-877069-25-3. See also the last Strahan's Mammals of Australia edited by Andrew M. Baker and Ian C. Gynther, New Holland Publishers, Fourth edition, 2023, 883 pages. ISBN 1925546750.

== See also ==
Mammals

- List of Australian mammals
- List of Australian monotremes and marsupials
- List of Australian bats
- List of Australian rodents
- List of placental mammals introduced to Australia
- List of Australian marine mammals

Other

- Australian megafauna, from first human colonisation to 1788
- Amphibians of Australia
- Birds of Australia
- Freshwater fish of Australia
- List of extinct animals of Australia
- Mammals of Australia, written in three volumes between 1845 and 1863 by John Gould.
- Threatened fauna of Australia
