= List of rodents of Australia =

This is a list of rodents of Australia. Australia has a large number of indigenous rodents, all from the family Muridae. The "Old endemics" group are member of tribe Hydromyini, which reached Australasia between 11 – 9 million years ago from Asia, while the "New endemics", members of the tribe Rattini, are presumed to have arrived more recently, between 4 – 3 million years ago, also from Asia. Murid rodents are one of the few placental mammals to have managed to cross the Wallace Line and colonize Australasia (which previously only contained marsupial and monotreme mammals) prior to European settlement, the others being bats and humans who, in turn, introduced the dingo.

The black rat, brown rat, Pacific rat and house mouse were accidentally introduced to Australia with European settlement, as was a small population of the five-lined palm squirrel near Perth. Grey squirrels have, since introduction, been eradicated from Australia.

== Old "endemics" * ==
=== Muridae ===
- White-footed rabbit-rat^{†}, Conilurus albipes - extinct
- Brush-tailed rabbit rat, Conilurus penicillatus
- Rakali (water rat), Hydromys chrysogaster
- Forrest's mouse, Leggadina forresti
- Lakeland Downs mouse, Leggadina lakedownensis
- Lesser stick-nest rat^{†}, Leporillus apicalis – extinct
- Greater stick-nest rat, Leporillus conditor
- Broad-toothed mouse, Mastacomys fuscus
- Grassland melomys, Melomys burtoni
- Cape York melomys, Melomys capensis
- Fawn-footed melomys, Melomys cervinipes
- Bramble Cay melomys^{†}, Melomys rubicola – extinct
- Black-footed tree-rat, Mesembriomys gouldi
- Golden-backed tree-rat, Mesembriomys macrurus
- Spinifex hopping mouse, Notomys alexis
- Short-tailed hopping mouse^{†}, Notomys amplus – extinct
- Northern hopping mouse, Notomys aquilo
- Fawn hopping mouse, Notomys cervinus
- Dusky hopping mouse, Notomys fuscus
- Long-tailed hopping mouse^{†}, Notomys longicaudatus – extinct
- Big-eared hopping mouse^{†}, Notomys macrotis – extinct
- Mitchell's hopping mouse, Notomys mitchelli
- Darling Downs hopping mouse^{†}, Notomys mordax – extinct
- Great hopping mouse^{†}, Notomys robustus- extinct
- Prehensile-tailed rat, Pogonomys mollipilosus
- Ash-grey mouse, Pseudomys albocinereus
- Silky mouse, Pseudomys apodemoides
- Plains rat, Pseudomys australis
- Bolam's mouse, Pseudomys bolami
- Kakadu pebble-mound mouse, Pseudomys calabyi
- Western pebble-mound mouse, Pseudomys chapmani
- Little native mouse, Pseudomys delicatulus
- Desert mouse, Pseudomys desertor
- Shark Bay mouse, Pseudomys fieldi
- Smoky mouse, Pseudomys fumeus
- Blue-grey mouse^{†}, Pseudomys glaucus – extinct
- Gould's mouse, Pseudomys gouldi
- Eastern chestnut mouse, Pseudomys gracilicaudatus
- Sandy inland mouse, Pseudomys hermannsburgensis
- Long-tailed mouse, Pseudomys higginsi
- Central pebble-mound mouse, Pseudomys johnsoni
- Kimberley mouse, Pseudomys laborifex
- Western chestnut mouse, Pseudomys nanus
- New Holland mouse, Pseudomys novaehollandiae
- Western mouse, Pseudomys occidentalis
- Hastings River mouse, Pseudomys oralis
- Pilliga mouse, Pseudomys pilligaensis
- Eastern pebble-mound mouse, Pseudomys patrius
- Heath mouse, Pseudomys shortridgei
- Giant white-tailed rat, Uromys caudimaculatus
- Masked white-tailed rat, Uromys hadrourus
- False water rat, Xeromys myoides
- Common rock rat, Zyzomys argurus
- Arnhem Land rock rat, Zyzomys maini
- Carpentarian rock rat, Zyzomys palatalis
- Central rock rat, Zyzomys pedunculatus
- Kimberley rock rat, Zyzomys woodwardi

== New "endemics" * ==
=== Muridae ===
- Dusky rat, Rattus colletti
- Bush rat, Rattus fuscipes
- Cape York rat, Rattus leucopus
- Swamp rat, Rattus lutreolus
- Canefield rat, Rattus sordidus
- Pale field rat, Rattus tunneyi
- Long-haired rat, Rattus villosissimus

== Introduced ==
=== Muridae ===
- House mouse^{¤}, Mus musculus
- Pacific rat^{¤}, Rattus exulans
- Brown rat^{¤}, Rattus norvegicus
- Black rat^{¤}, Rattus rattus

=== Sciuridae ===
- Five-lined palm squirrel^{¤}, Funambulus pennantii
- Grey squirrel^{¤}, Sciurus carolinensis – now extinct in Australia

== Notes ==
^{†} Extinct

^{¤} Introduced

* Several of these species are not actually endemic to Australia, but to the Australasian realm, which includes Papua New Guinea and eastern Indonesia. The headings "Old Endemics" and "New Endemics" are used here in that sense (after Strahan).

== See also ==
- List of mammals of Australia
  - List of monotremes and marsupials of Australia
  - List of bats of Australia
  - List of placental mammals introduced to Australia
  - List of marine mammals of Australia
