= List of mammals of Tasmania =

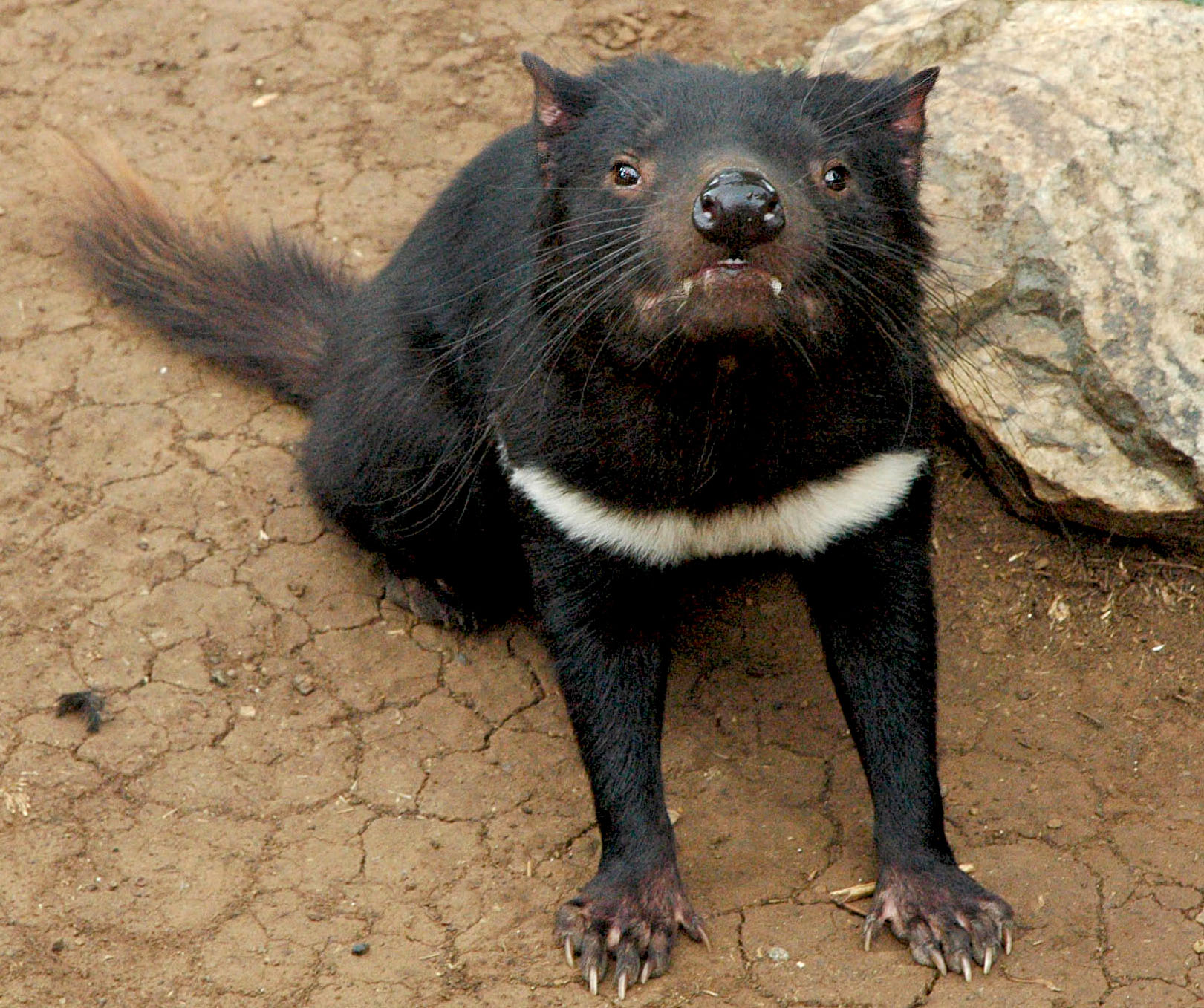
The Tasmanian devil, an iconic Tasmanian mammal

Tasmanian mammals are divided into three major groups based on reproductive techniques: egg laying mammals (the monotremes), pouched mammals (the marsupials), and placental mammals. This is a list of mammals of Tasmania:

== Order: Monotremata (monotremes) ==
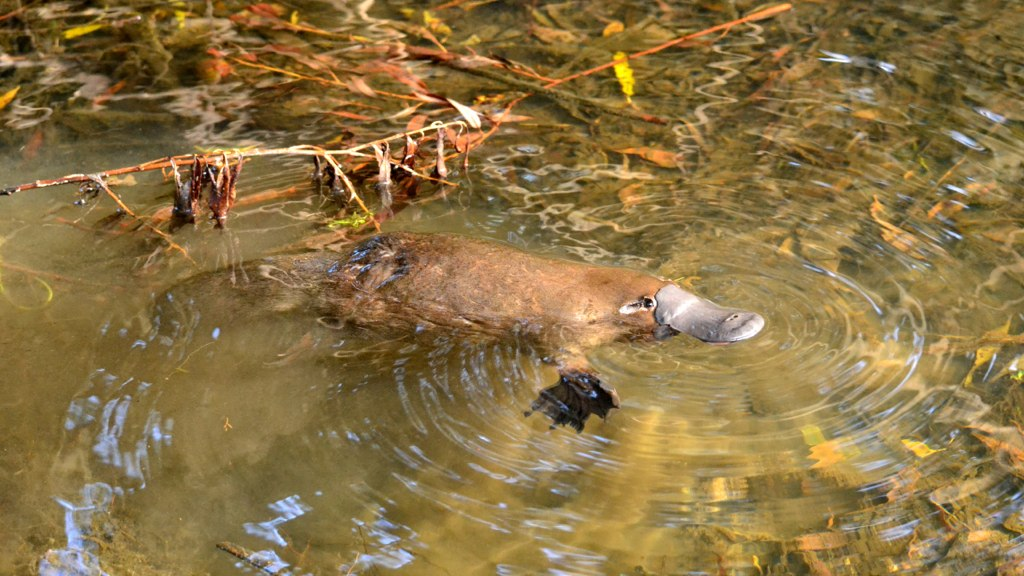
Platypus

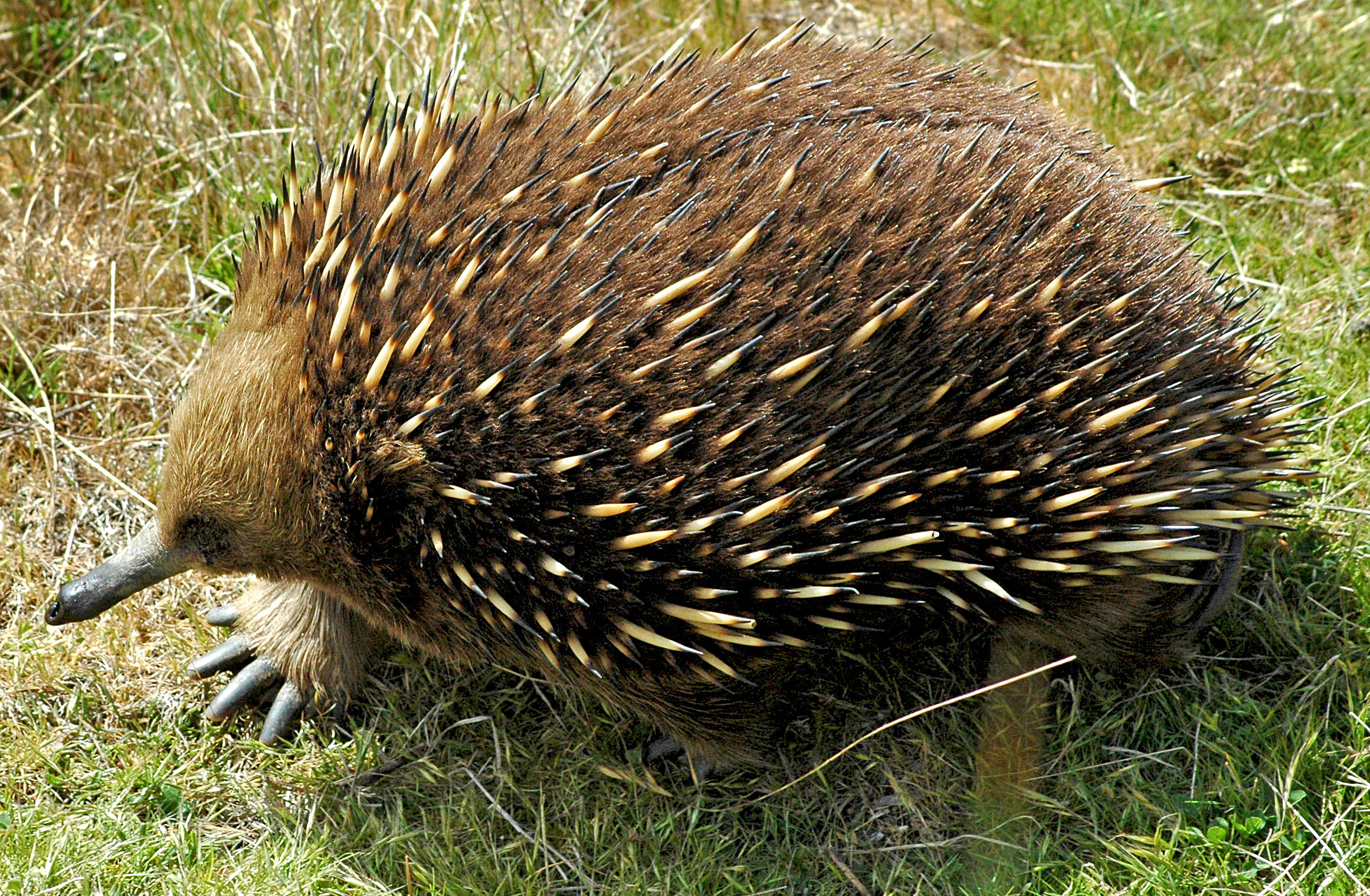
Short-beaked echidna

- Family: Ornithorhynchidae
  - Genus: Ornithorhynchus
    - Platypus, Ornithorhynchus anatinus LC
- Family: Tachyglossidae
  - Genus: Tachyglossus
    - Short-beaked echidna, Tachyglossus aculeatus LC

== Infraclass: Marsupialia (marsupials) ==
=== Order: Dasyuromorphia (marsupial carnivores) ===
- Family: Thylacinidae
  - Genus: Thylacinus
    - Thylacine, T. cynocephalus EX endemic
- Family: Dasyuridae
  - Subfamily: Dasyurinae
    - Tribe: Dasyurinae
      - Genus: Dasyurus
        - Tiger quoll, D. maculatus NT
        - Eastern quoll, D. viverrinus EN endemic (introduced to Australian mainland)
      - Genus: Sarcophilus
        - Tasmanian devil, S. harrisii EN endemic
    - Tribe: Phascogalini
      - Genus: Antechinus
        - Swamp antechinus, A. minimus EN
        - Dusky antechinus, A. swainsonii EN
  - Subfamily: Sminthopsinae
    - Tribe: Sminthopsini
      - Genus: Sminthopsis
        - White-footed dunnart, S. leucopus VU

=== Order: Peramelemorphia (bandicoots and bilbies) ===
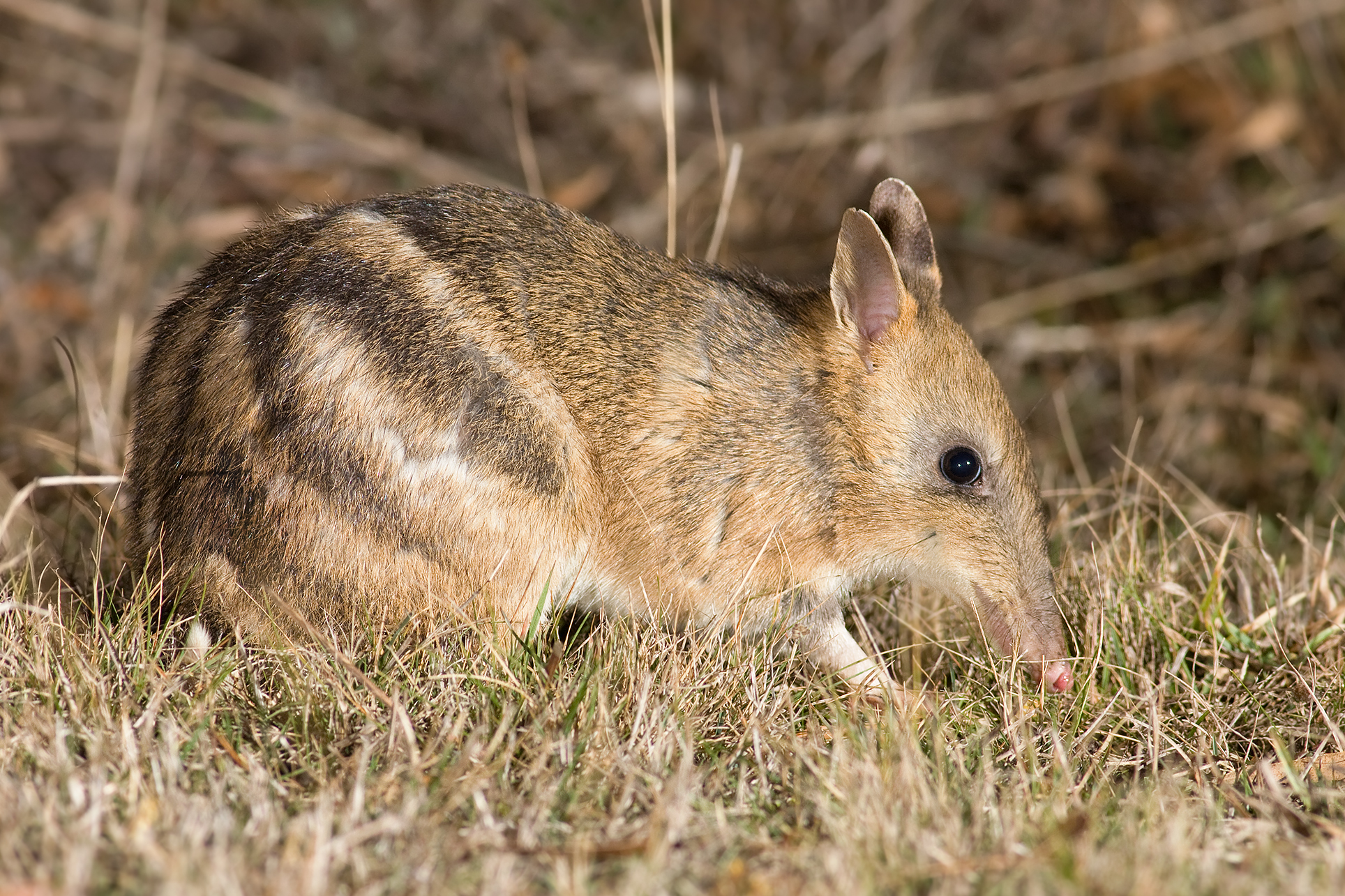
Eastern barred bandicoot

- Family: Peramelidae
  - Subfamily: Peramelinae
    - Genus: Isoodon
      - Southern brown bandicoot, Isoodon obesulus LC
    - Genus: Perameles
      - Eastern barred bandicoot, Perameles gunnii NT

=== Order: Diprotodontia ===
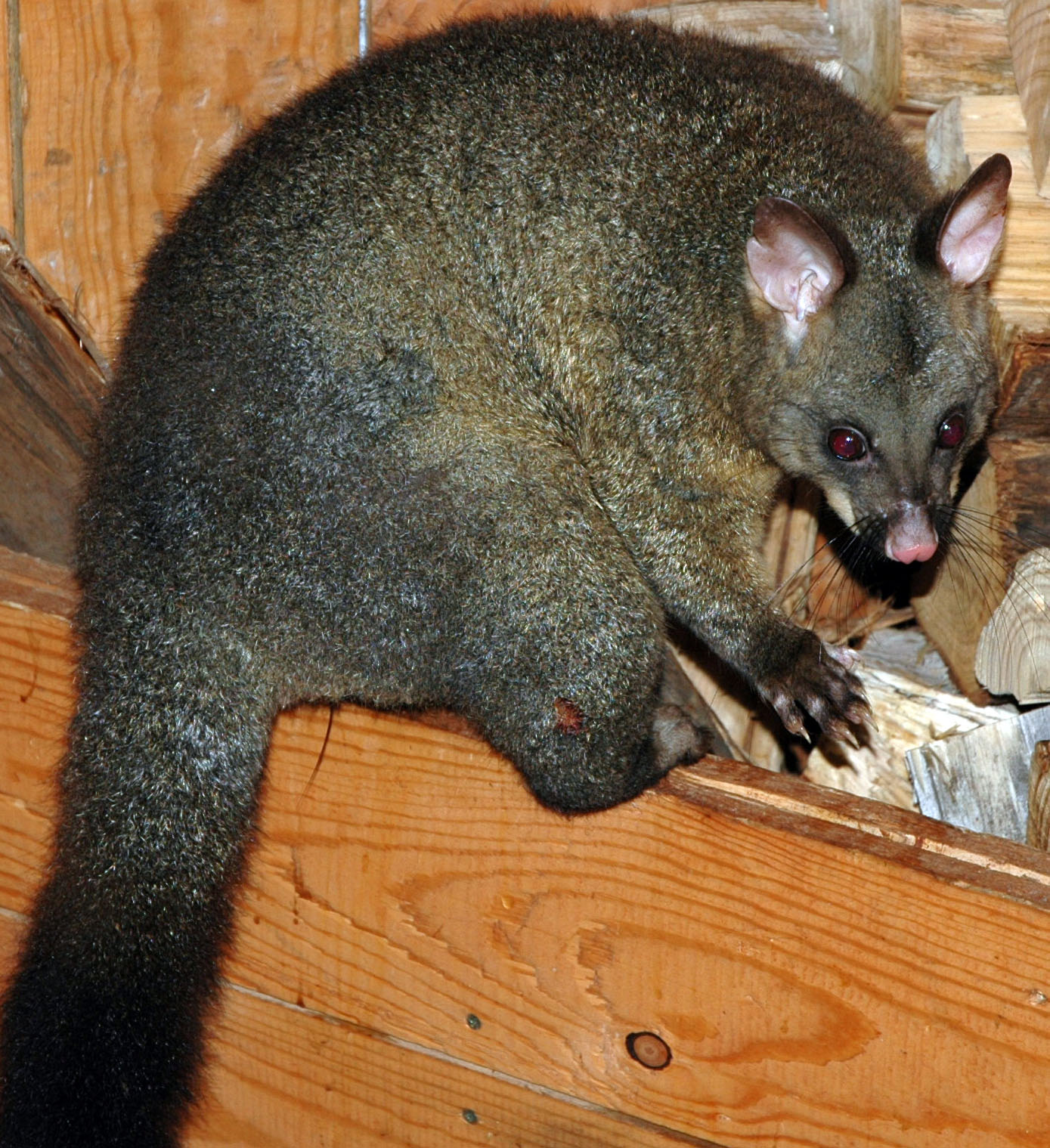
Common brushtail possum

==== Suborder: Vombatiformes (wombats and koalas) ====
- Family: Vombatidae
  - Genus: Vombatus
    - Common wombat, Vombatus ursinus LC

==== Suborder: Phalangeriformes (possums and gliders) ====
- Family: Phalangeridae
  - Genus: Trichosurus
    - Common brushtail possum, Trichosurus vulpecula LC
- Family: Burramyidae
  - Genus: Cercartetus
    - Tasmanian pygmy possum, Cercartetus lepidus LC
    - Eastern pygmy possum, Cercartetus nanus LC
- Family: Petauridae
  - Genus: Petaurus
    - Krefft's glider, Petaurus notatus introduced (Australian mainland native)
- Family: Pseudocheiridae
  - Genus: Pseudocheirus
    - Common ringtail possum, Pseudocheirus peregrinus LC

==== Suborder: Macropodiformes (kangaroos and wallabies) ====
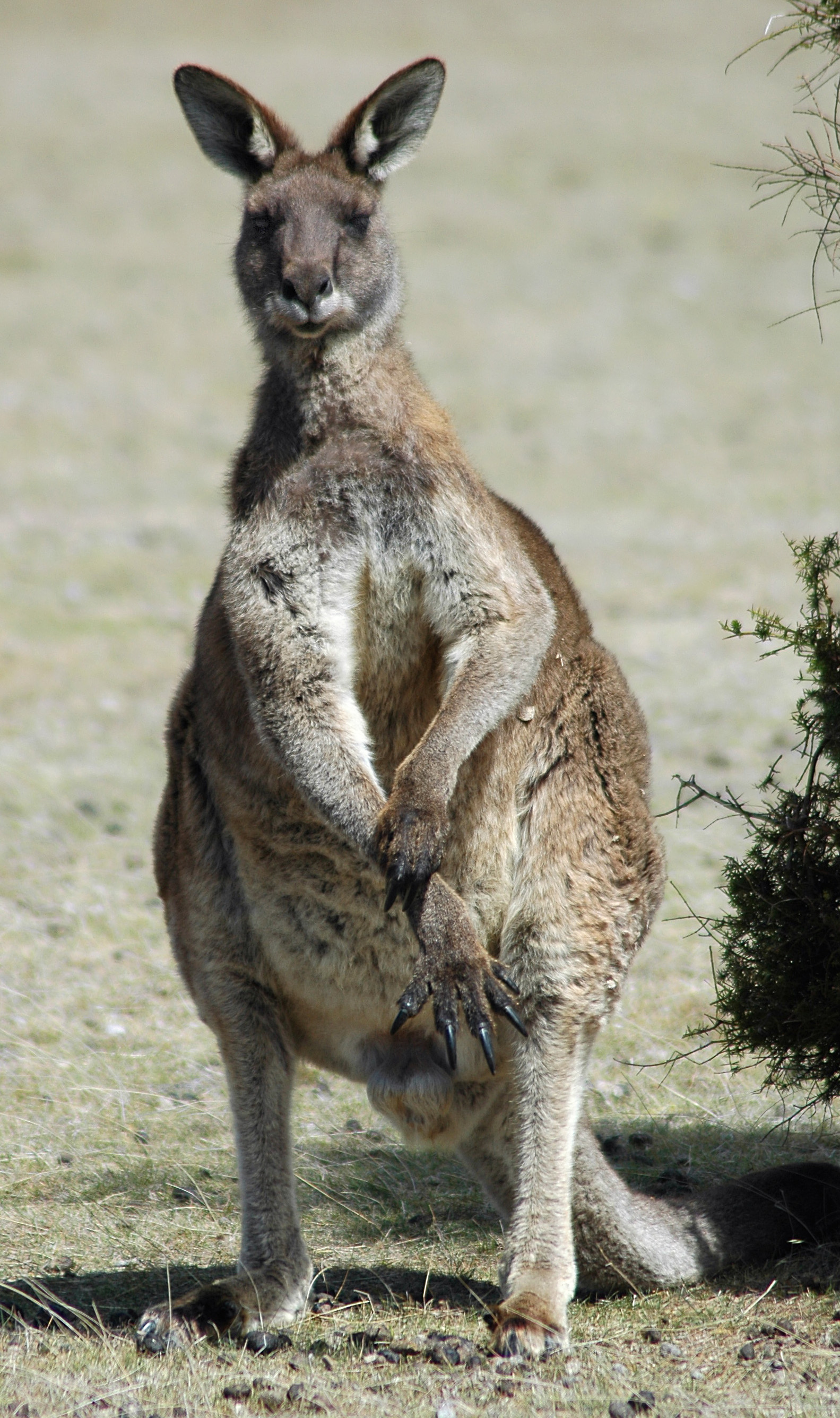
Eastern grey kangaroo

- Family: Potoroidae
  - Genus: Bettongia
    - Southern bettong, Bettongia gaimardi endemic NT
  - Genus: Potorous
    - Long-nosed potoroo, Potorous tridactylus LC
- Family: Macropodidae
  - Genus: Macropus
    - Eastern grey kangaroo, Macropus giganteus LC
  - Genus: Notamacropus
    - Red-necked wallaby, N. rufogriseus LC
  - Genus: Thylogale
    - Tasmanian pademelon, Thylogale billardierii endemic LC

== Infraclass: Eutheria (placentals) ==
=== Order: Artiodactyla (even-toed ungulates) ===
- Family: Cervidae
  - Subfamily: Cervinae
    - Genus: Dama
      - Common fallow deer, Dama dama introduced

=== Order: Carnivora ===
- Family: Otariidae (eared seals)
  - Genus: Arctocephalus
    - Cape fur seal, Arctocephalus pusillus LC
    - New Zealand fur seal, Arctocephalus fosteri LC
- Family: Phocidae (true seals)
  - Genus: Mirounga
    - Southern elephant seal, Mirounga leonina LC
  - Genus: Hydrurga
    - Leopard seal, Hydrurga leptonyx LC

=== Order: Chiroptera (bats) ===
- Family: Vespertilionidae
  - Genus: Vespadelus
    - Little forest bat, Vespadelus vulturnus LR/lc
    - Southern forest bat, Vespadelus regulus LR/lc
    - Large forest bat, Vespadelus darlingtoni LR/lc
  - Genus: Chalinolobus
    - Chocolate wattled bat, Chalinolobus morio LC
    - Gould's wattled bat, Chalinolobus gouldii LR/lc
  - Genus: Nyctophilus
    - Lesser long-eared bat, Nyctophilus geoffroyi LC
    - Greater long-eared bat, Nyctophilus timoriensis DD
  - Genus: Falsistrellus
    - Eastern false pipistrelle, Falsistrellus tasmaniensis LC

=== Lagomorpha ===
- Family: Leporidae (rabbits and hares)
  - Genus: Oryctolagus
    - European rabbit, Oryctolagus cuniculus introduced
  - Genus: Lepus
    - European hare, Lepus europaeus introduced

=== Rodentia (rats and mice) ===
- Family: Muridae
  - Genus: Hydromys
    - Rakali, Hydromys chrysogaster LC
  - Genus: Mus
    - House mouse, Mus musculus LC introduced
  - Genus: Pseudomys
    - Long-tailed mouse, Pseudomys higginsi LR/lc endemic
    - New Holland mouse, Pseudomys novaehollandiae VU
  - Genus: Mastacomys
    - Broad-toothed mouse, Mastacomys fuscus NT
  - Genus: Rattus
    - Swamp rat, Rattus lutreolus LR/lc
    - Black rat, Rattus rattus LC introduced
    - Brown rat, Rattus norvegicus LC introduced

=== Order: Cetacea (whales and dolphins) ===
==== Suborder: Odontoceti (toothed whales) ====
- Family: Delphinidae (dolphins)
  - Genus: Globicephala
    - Long-finned pilot whale, Globicephala melaena DD
  - Genus: Orcinus
    - Killer whale, Orcinus orca DD
  - Genus: Pseudorca
    - False killer whale, Pseudorca crassidens DD
  - Genus: Delphinus
    - Short-beaked common dolphin, Delphinus delphis LC
  - Genus: Tursiops
    - Common bottlenose dolphin, Tursiops truncatus LC
- Family: Physeteridae (sperm whales)
  - Genus: Physeter
    - Sperm whale, Physeter catodon VU

==== Parvorder: Mysticeti (baleen whales) ====
- Family: Balaenidae (right whales)
  - Genus: Eubalaena
    - Southern right whale, Eubalaena australis LC
  - Genus: Caperea
    - Pygmy right whale, Caperea marginata DD
  - Genus: Megaptera
    - Humpback whale, Megaptera novaeangliae LC

== See also ==
- List of mammals of Australia
  - List of bats of Australia
  - List of rodents of Australia
  - List of marine mammals of Australia
- List of monotremes and marsupials
