= D'Entrecasteaux Archipelago pogonomys =

Conservation status
- Endangered (IUCN 3.1)

Scientific classification
- Kingdom: Animalia
- Phylum: Chordata
- Class: Mammalia
- Order: Rodentia
- Family: Muridae
- Genus: Pogonomys
- Species: P. fergussoniensis

Binomial name
- Pogonomys fergussoniensis Laurie, 1952

Species of mammal

The D'Entrecasteaux Archipelago pogonomys (Pogonomys fergussoniensis), also known as the D'Entrecasteaux Archipelago tree mouse, is a species of prehensile-tailed rat from the family Muridae that is endemic to Papua New Guinea. It was once considered to be a subspecies of the Large Tree Mouse. Deforestation is posing a threat to the species, but it has been suspected that the species has some degree of tolerance towards disturbance of its habitat.

== Taxonomy ==
The D'Entrecasteaux Archipelago pogonomys is often confused to be a subspecies of the large tree mouse (P. lorie), of which it shares a genus. the D'Entrecasteaux Archipelago pogonomys was referred to as a separate species of pogonomys in Laurie and Hill's (1954) checklist, but was referred to as a subspecies of the Large Tree Mouse by Dennis and Menzies (1979), Flannery (1990b), Flannery (1995a), and Musser and Carleton (1993). Flannery (1995b) noted that "fergussoniensis is very distinctive, being very large and having a reddish rather than gray dorsum. I suspect that further studies will reveal it to represent a distinct species." The D'Entrecasteaux Archipelago pogonomys has a larger body and skull size, as well as brownish red upperparts, buffy gray underparts, and sleek fur. The Large Tree Mouse has a dark brownish gray dorsal coat, white underparts, and woolly fur.

The taxonomic relationship between the D'Entrecasteaux Archipelago pognomys and the greater tree mouse (Chiruromys forbesi) has yet to be resolved.

== Range and population ==
The D'Entrecasteaux Archipelago pogonomys is endemic to Papua New Guinea, specifically the D'Entrecasteaux Archipelago. The species has been recorded on Fergusson Island, Goodenough Island, and Normanby Island. This species of pogonomys is terrestrial, with specimens collected at the "oak-rainforest transition" and climbing in vegetation close to a village.

The population has been rarely collected, and there are few known specimens of the species; the population is believed, however, to be decreasing.

== Conservation status ==
The International Union for Conservation of Nature (IUCN) currently lists the D'Entrecasteaux Archipelago pogonomys as an endangered species due to the extent of occurrence being less than five thousand square kilometers, the presence of individuals in fewer than six locations, continuing deforestation in its habitat, and the decreasing population of mature individuals. It has been suspected, but not confirmed, that the species is tolerant of some disturbance to its habitat.

Because the islands are being converted to grassland for subsistence farming, deforestation is a major threat to the population of the species. It is unknown if the D'Entrecasteaux Archipelago pogonomys is present in any protected areas, and further studies need to be conducted in distribution, abundance, natural history, habitat status, and threats.

== See also ==
- Greater tree mouse
- Large Tree Mouse
