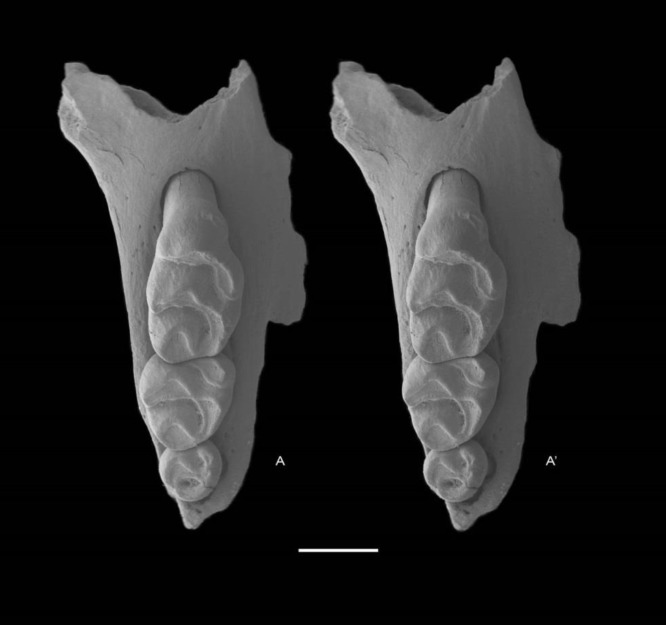
- Leggadina-gregoriensis (fossil scan)

Scientific classification
- Domain: Eukaryota
- Kingdom: Animalia
- Phylum: Chordata
- Class: Mammalia
- Order: Rodentia
- Family: Muridae
- Tribe: Hydromyini
- Genus: Leggadina; Thomas, 1910

Type species
- Mus forresti

Species
- Leggadina forresti Leggadina lakedownensis

= Leggadina =

Leggadina Temporal range: Pleistocene to Recent

Genus of rodents

Leggadina is a genus of rodents from Australia.

== Species ==
Genus Leggadina

- Forrest's mouse, Leggadina forresti Thomas, 1906
- Lakeland Downs mouse, Leggadina lakedownensis Watts, 1976
