= Champion's tree mouse =

Conservation status
- Data Deficient (IUCN 3.1)

Scientific classification
- Domain: Eukaryota
- Kingdom: Animalia
- Phylum: Chordata
- Class: Mammalia
- Order: Rodentia
- Family: Muridae
- Genus: Pogonomys
- Species: P. championi

Binomial name
- Pogonomys championi Flannery, 1988

Species of rodent

Champion's tree mouse (Pogonomys championi) is a species of rodent in the family Muridae. It is found only in Papua New Guinea.
