= Pebble-mound mouse =

Scientific classification
- Kingdom: Animalia
- Phylum: Chordata
- Class: Mammalia
- Order: Rodentia
- Family: Muridae
- Genus: Pseudomys
- Species group: Pebble-mound mice

Species
- Pseudomys calabyi; Pseudomys chapmani; Pseudomys johnsoni; Pseudomys patrius

Group of australian rodents

Pebble-mound mice are a group of rodents from Australia in the genus Pseudomys. They are small, brownish mice with medium to long, often pinkish brown tails. Unlike some other species of Pseudomys, they construct mounds of pebbles around their burrows, which play an important role in their social life.

There are four complementarily distributed species of pebble-mound mice in northern Australia. Their distribution appears to be limited by climatic conditions and the availability of pebbles and is thought to be the result of early Pleistocene dispersal across areas that are now inhospitable to pebble-mound mice. None of the four species is endangered.

== Taxonomy ==
Pebble-mound mice also known as field mice comprise four species, which have complementary distributions across northern Australia. The four species are as follows:

- Western pebble-mound mouse (Pseudomys chapmani), Pilbara region (northern Western Australia), first described in 1980.
- Central pebble-mound mouse (Pseudomys johnsoni), from the Kimberley region of northernmost Western Australia through the central Northern Territory into westernmost Queensland, first described in 1985. The western populations were previously thought to be a separate species, P. laborifex, described in 1986, but the two are very closely related and are now considered to form a single species. Kimberley Mouse (Pseudomys laborifex) is still considered to be a unique species by the Western Australian Museum as of March 2015.
- Kakadu pebble-mound mouse (Pseudomys calabyi), northern Northern Territory, first described in 1987. It was first described as a subspecies of P. laborifex, but later recognized as a distinct species.
- Eastern pebble-mound mouse (Pseudomys patrius), eastern Queensland, first described in 1909. It was associated with the little native mouse (Pseudomys delicatulus) for many decades and recognized as a pebble-mound mouse only in 1991.

Pebble-mound mice are currently classified within the genus Pseudomys, a diverse group that includes morphologically and behaviorally disparate species. The four pebble-mound mice form a cohesive group supported by behavioral, morphological, and molecular similarities and may deserve recognition as a separate genus.

== Description ==
Pebble-mound mice are small, mouse-like animals, about 12 to 15 grams (0.42 to 0.53 oz) in mass. The upperparts are brownish, from grey-brown in some Kakadu pebble-mound mice to yellow-brown in the eastern pebble-mound mouse. The underparts are white and are sharply demarcated from the upperparts except in the eastern pebble-mound mouse. The tail ranges from about as long as the head and body in the Kakadu pebble-mound mouse to much longer in the western pebble-mound mouse. It is brown or grey above and white below in the central pebble-mound mouse and uniformly pinkish brown in the other species. Pebble-mound mice are morphologically readily recognizable and share a pseudogene that is absent in other groups. They are unique among murid rodents in exhibiting mutations in the ZPc gene that change the protein sequence.

== Distribution and habitat ==
Pebble-mound mice are found in areas with suitable amounts of available pebbles across tropical Australia. They occur in areas with hot summers and mild winters, with precipitation mainly during the summer. They generally live in open, rocky areas with the vegetation dominated by Eucalyptus trees, but the distributions of the Kakadu and eastern pebble-mound mice also includes areas with denser vegetation and that of the western pebble-mound mouse is dominated by Acacia instead. The distribution of pebble-mound mice is limited by suitable climate and by the availability of pebbles. Competition with other rodents is unlikely to play a major role. The distribution of pebble-mound mice, especially the western pebble-mound mouse, is slowly shrinking because of expanding arid areas, leading to fragmentation of their habitat.

Currently, the western and eastern pebble-mound mice are each separated from the central and Kakadu pebble-mound mice by large swathes of unsuitable, sandy habitat. These areas may have been bridges by rocky habitats until the early Pleistocene, suggesting that the current distribution of pebble-mound mice dates at least from that period.

== Behavior ==
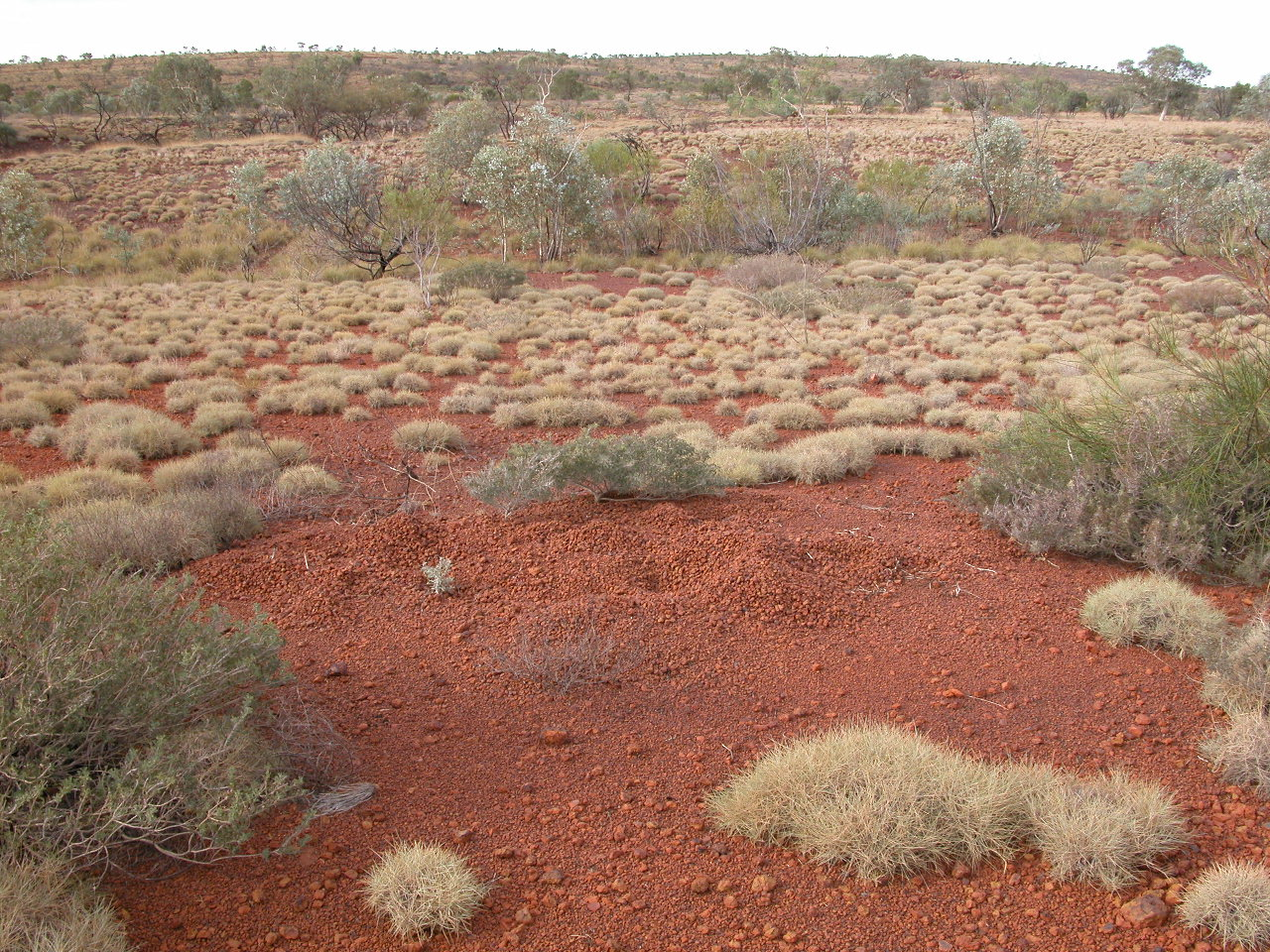
A mound of the western pebble-mound mouse, center foreground, among Triodia hummocks in the Pilbara region of Western Australia.

Pebble-mound mice are the only mammals to create mounds of small stones around their burrows. The mice carry the pebbles in their mouths in a radius of 3 to 5 m (9.8 to 16.4 ft) around the nest and move them into location with their forelimbs. Mounds may cover areas of up to 10 m^{2} (110 ft^{2}) and include up to 50 kg (110 lb) of pebbles, concentrated near burrow entrances, above burrows, and against trees. Because resources are sparse, home ranges tend to be relatively large and may be greater than 5 hectares (12 acres).

The function of the mounds may be one of protection against predators. Pebble mounds are at the center of social life at least in the two best-studied species, the western and eastern pebble-mound mice. In western pebble-mound mice, mounds have been found to contain up to 14 individuals, but social groups in eastern pebble-mound mice are smaller. Young animals are raised in the mounds. For unclear reasons, females visit and manipulate different mounds. Females only disperse to adjacent mounds, but males may move longer distances, though they remain in pebbly areas. Male eastern pebble-mound mice may move up to 2 km (1.2 mi) in a single night.

== Conservation ==
The IUCN currently lists three of the four species as "Least Concern" because of their wide distribution and occurrence in protected areas. The population size of the central pebble-mound mouse appears to be stable and while the western and eastern species are declining, their decline is unlikely to be fast enough to qualify for one of the IUCN's other categories. The Kakadu pebble-mound mouse is listed as "Vulnerable" because of its small and declining distribution and because it does not occur in meaningful protected areas.

== Literature cited ==
- Aplin, K.; Woinarski, J. (2017) [errata version of 2016 assessment]. "Pseudomys johnsoni". IUCN Red List of Threatened Species. 2016 e.T18568A115144512. doi:10.2305/IUCN.UK.2016-3.RLTS.T18568A22399330.en.
- Breed, Bill; Ford, Fred (2007). Native Mice and Rats. Collingwood, Vic: CSIRO PUBLISHING. ISBN 978-0-643-09166-5.
- Burnett, S.; Aplin, K. (2017) [errata version of 2016 assessment]. "Pseudomys patrius". IUCN Red List of Threatened Species. 2016 e.T18571A115144755. doi:10.2305/IUCN.UK.2016-3.RLTS.T18571A22399106.en.
- Ford, Fred (2006). "A splitting headache: relationships and generic boundaries among Australian murids: SYSTEMATICS OF AUSTRALIAN MURIDS". Biological Journal of the Linnean Society. 89 (1): 117–138. doi:10.1111/j.1095-8312.2006.00663.x.
- Ford, Fred; Johnson, Christopher (2007). "Eroding abodes and vanished bridges: historical biogeography of the substrate specialist pebble-mound mice ( Pseudomys )". Journal of Biogeography. 34 (3): 514–523. doi:10.1111/j.1365-2699.2006.01649.x. ISSN 0305-0270.
- Menkhorst, Peter (2001). A Field Guide to the Mammals of Australia. South Melbourne, Australia; New York: Oxford University Press, USA. ISBN 0-19-550870-X.
- Burbidge, A.A. (2017) [errata version of 2016 assessment]. "Pseudomys chapmani". IUCN Red List of Threatened Species. 2016 e.T42648A115198963. doi:10.2305/IUCN.UK.2016-3.RLTS.T42648A22398949.en.
- Musser, G.G.; Carleton, M.D. (2005). "Superfamily Muroidea". In Wilson, D.E.; Reeder, D.M. (eds.). Mammal Species of the World: a taxonomic and geographic reference (3rd ed.). Baltimore: The Johns Hopkins University Press. pp. 894–1531. ISBN 978-0-8018-8221-0.
- Woinarski, J.; Burbidge, A.A. (2016). "Pseudomys calabyi". IUCN Red List of Threatened Species. 2016 e.T136808A22399037. doi:10.2305/IUCN.UK.2016-3.RLTS.T136808A22399037.en.
