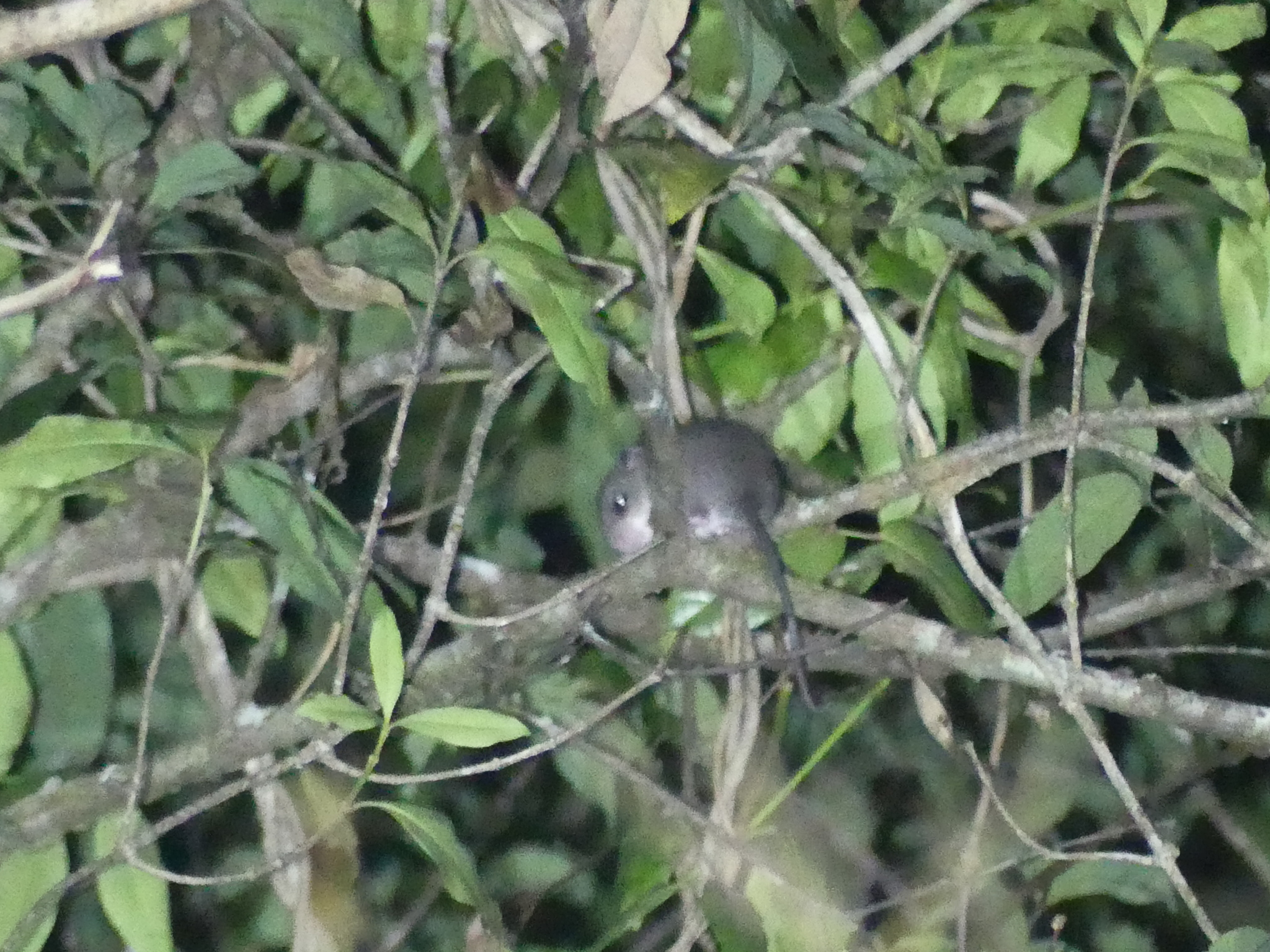

Conservation status
- Least Concern (IUCN 3.1)

Scientific classification
- Kingdom: Animalia
- Phylum: Chordata
- Class: Mammalia
- Order: Rodentia
- Family: Muridae
- Genus: Pogonomys
- Species: P. macrourus

Binomial name
- Pogonomys macrourus (Milne-Edwards, 1877)

= Chestnut tree mouse =

Species of rodent

The chestnut tree mouse (Pogonomys macrourus) is a species of rodent in the family Muridae. It is found in Indonesia and Papua New Guinea.
