= Pogonomys =

Scientific classification
- Domain: Eukaryota
- Kingdom: Animalia
- Phylum: Chordata
- Class: Mammalia
- Order: Rodentia
- Family: Muridae
- Subfamily: Murinae
- Tribe: Hydromyini
- Genus: Pogonomys; Milne-Edwards, 1877

Type species
- Mus (Pogonomys) macrourus

Species
- Pogonomys championi Pogonomys fergussoniensis Pogonomys loriae Pogonomys macrourus Pogonomys mollipilosus Pogonomys sylvestris

Genus of rodents

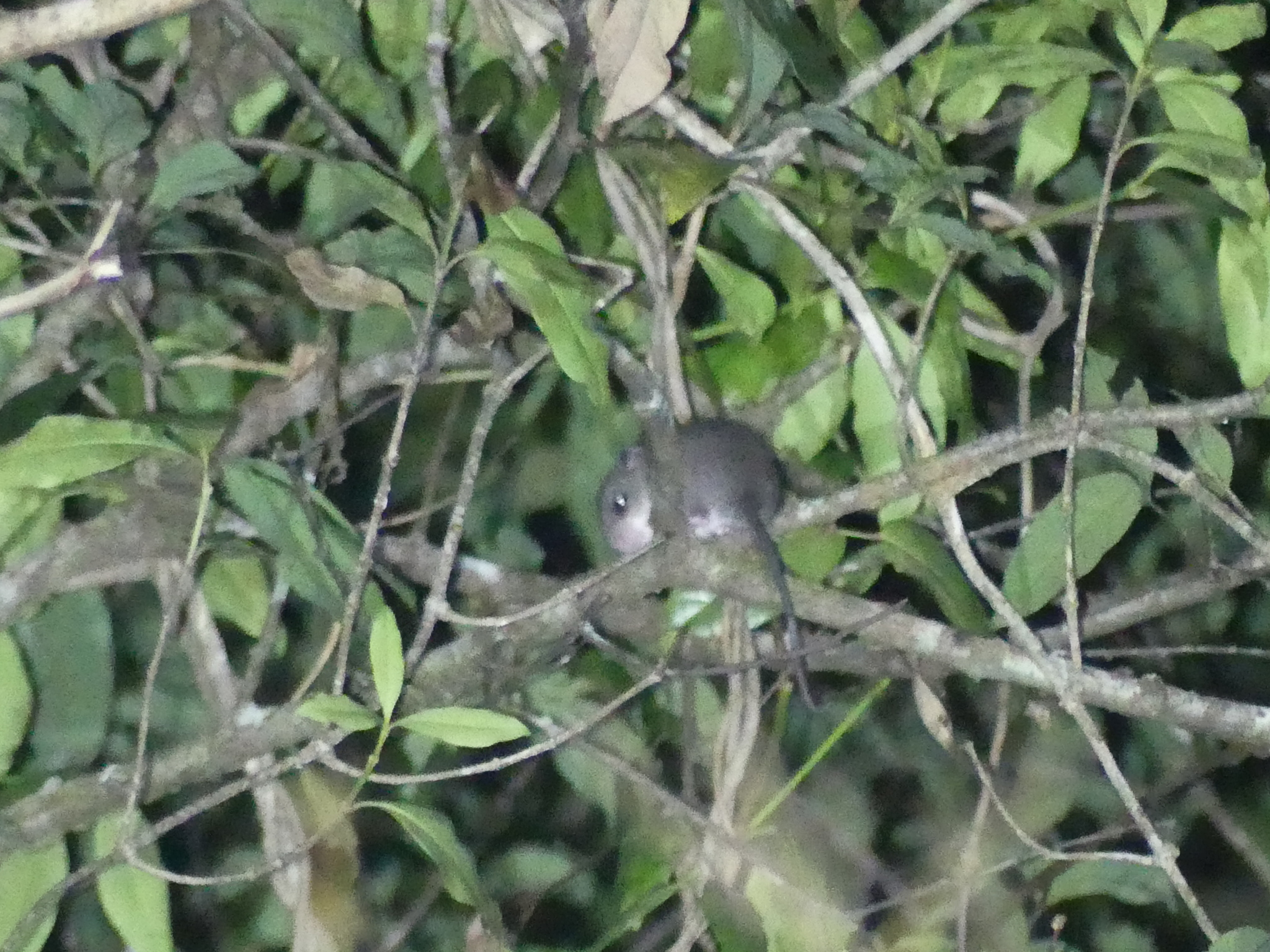
Chestnut tree mouse (Pogonomys macrourus)

Pogonomys is a genus of rodent in the family Muridae, found in New Guinea and the D'Entrecasteaux Islands, with one species (the prehensile-tailed rat) being found also in Australia.

Species include:

- Champion's tree mouse (Pogonomys championi)
- D'Entrecasteaux Archipelago pogonomys (Pogonomys fergussoniensis)
- Large tree mouse (Pogonomys loriae)
- Chestnut tree mouse (Pogonomys macrourus)
- Prehensile-tailed rat (Pogonomys mollipilosus)
- Gray-bellied tree mouse (Pogonomys sylvestris)
