= List of mammals of Australia =

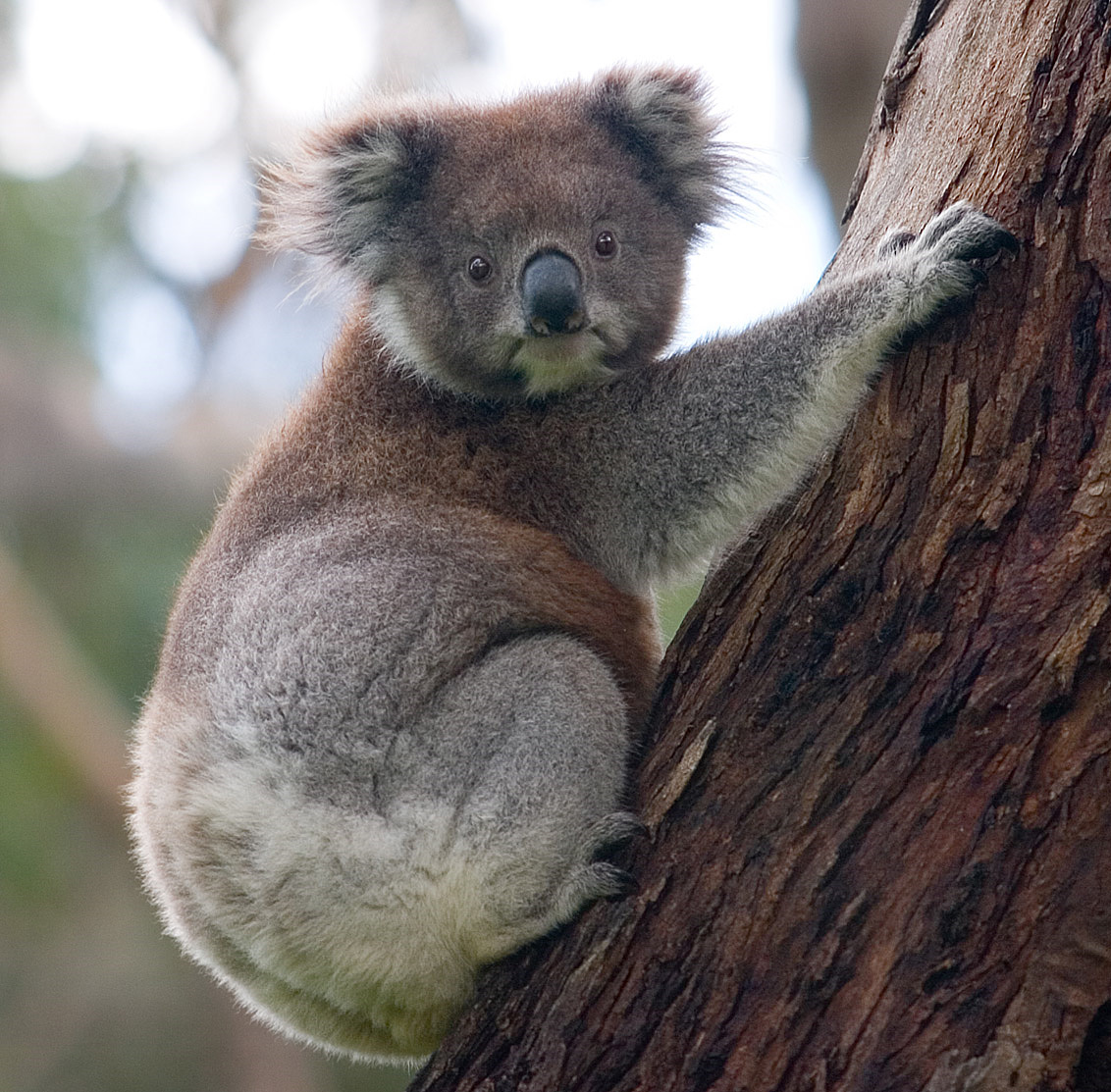
Koala

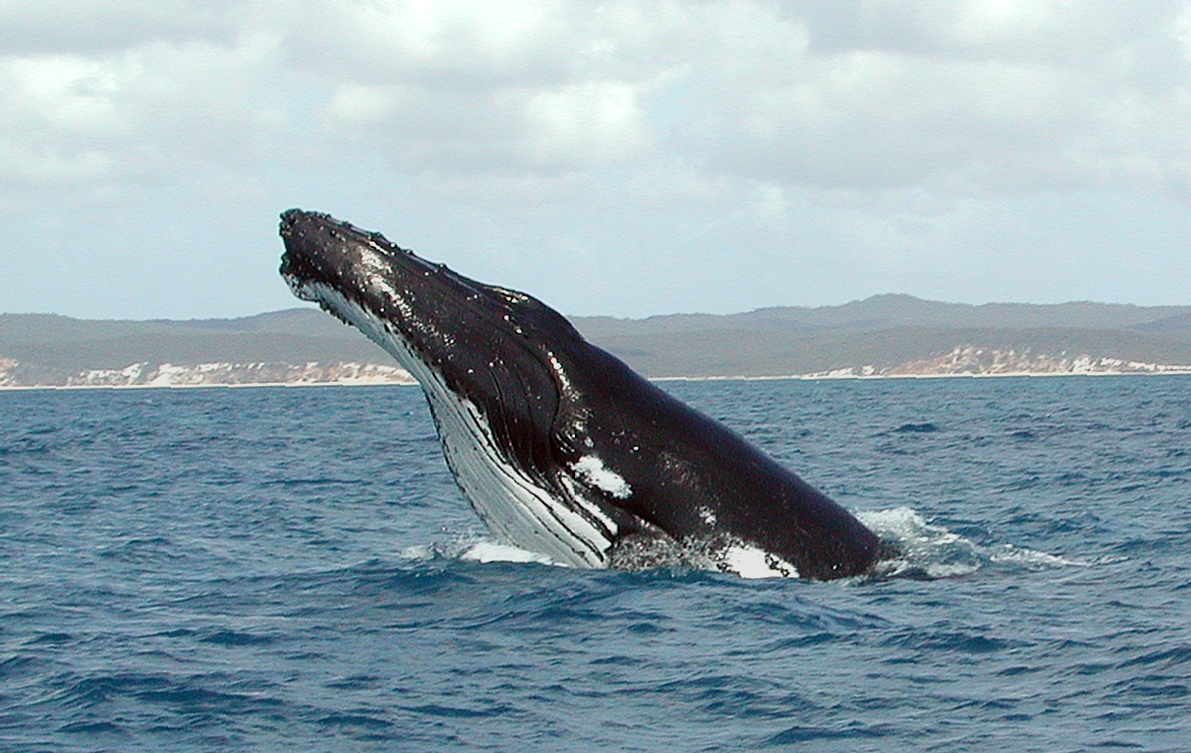
Humpback whale

A total of 386 species of mammals have been recorded in Australia and surrounding continental waters: 364 indigenous and 22 introduced. The list includes 2 monotremes, 154 marsupials, 83 bats, 69 rodents (5 introduced), 10 pinnipeds, 3 terrestrial carnivorans (2 recent introductions, and 1 prehistoric introduction), 13 introduced ungulates, 2 introduced lagomorphs, 44 cetaceans and 1 sirenian. The taxonomy and nomenclature used here generally follows Van Dyck and Strahan.

== Lists of mammals of Australia ==
- List of bats of Australia
- List of marine mammals of Australia
- List of monotremes and marsupials of Australia
- List of placental mammals introduced to Australia
- List of rodents of Australia

== Lists of mammals by Australian state or territory ==
- List of mammals of New South Wales
- List of mammals of South Australia
- List of mammals of the Northern Territory
- List of mammals of Victoria
- List of mammals of Western Australia
- List of mammals of Tasmania
- List of mammals of Queensland
- List of mammals of the Australian Capital Territory

== Lists of mammals by Australian external territory ==
- List of mammals of Christmas Island
- List of mammals of the Cocos (Keeling) Islands
- List of mammals of Heard Island and McDonald Islands
- List of mammals of the Coral Sea Islands
- List of mammals of Ashmore Reef
- List of mammals of Norfolk Island
- List of mammals of Boigu, Saibai and Dauan Islands (Torres Strait)
- List of mammals of Macquarie Island

== See also ==
- Fauna of Australia
- List of Nature Conservation Act endangered fauna of Queensland
