= Forrest's mouse =

Conservation status
- Least Concern (IUCN 3.1)

Scientific classification
- Kingdom: Animalia
- Phylum: Chordata
- Class: Mammalia
- Infraclass: Placentalia
- Order: Rodentia
- Family: Muridae
- Genus: Leggadina
- Species: L. forresti

Binomial name
- Leggadina forresti (Thomas, 1906)

Species of rodent

The Forrest's mouse (Leggadina forresti), or desert short-tailed mouse, is a small species of rodent in the family Muridae. It is a widespread but sparsely distributed species found across arid and semi-arid inland Australia, commonly found in tussock grassland, chenopod shrubland, and mulga or savannah woodlands.

== Description ==
The Forrest's mouse is a small mouse weighing between 15 and 25 grams (0.53 and 0.88 oz), but recorded to 30 grams (1.1 oz). Short, thick tail that is distinctly less than (60–70%) of the combined head and body length. Body is thickset with a broad, blunt muzzle, and relatively small ears and eyes. Upperparts are a thick, lustrous and short fur of pale yellow brown or greyish fawn, with a pencilling of darker hairs, and small white patches behind the ears. There is a strong demarcation to white under the lower jaw, chin and feet, with the sparsely haired tail grey above and pale grey below, and the ears rounded and pinkish-grey.

== Taxonomy ==
Oldfield Thomas first identified Leggadina forresti in 1906 from a specimen collected at Alexandria Station in the Northern Territory. The genus Leggadina contains two species, both found in Australia including Leggadina forresti and the tropical short-tailed mouse, or Lakeland Downs mouse Leggadina lakedownensis, which is found in moist tussock grassland and tropical savannah of coastal northern Australia.

Several synonyms exist for this species:

- Mus forresti (Thomas, 1906)
- Pseudomys messorius (Thomas, 1925)
- Pseudomys waitei (Troughton, 1932)
- Gyomys berneyi (Troughton, 1936)

== Distribution ==
Widespread but sparsely distributed across much of arid and semi-arid inland Australia, from eastern Western Australia to Rolleston in central Queensland, the Barkly Tableland in the Northern Territory to Cockburn, South Australia. In New South Wales, has been recorded in Sturt National Park, Tibooburra, and as sub-fossil remains at Mutawintji National Park.

== Conservation status ==
The species was previously listed as Lower Risk/near threatened in 1996 on the IUCN Red List of Threatened Species, but was reassessed in 2008 as a species of least concern. The Forrest's mouse is not listed under the Australian Environment Protection and Biodiversity Conservation Act 1999, but is listed as Vulnerable in NSW on Schedule 2 of the Threatened Species Conservation Act 1995.

== Ecology and habitat ==
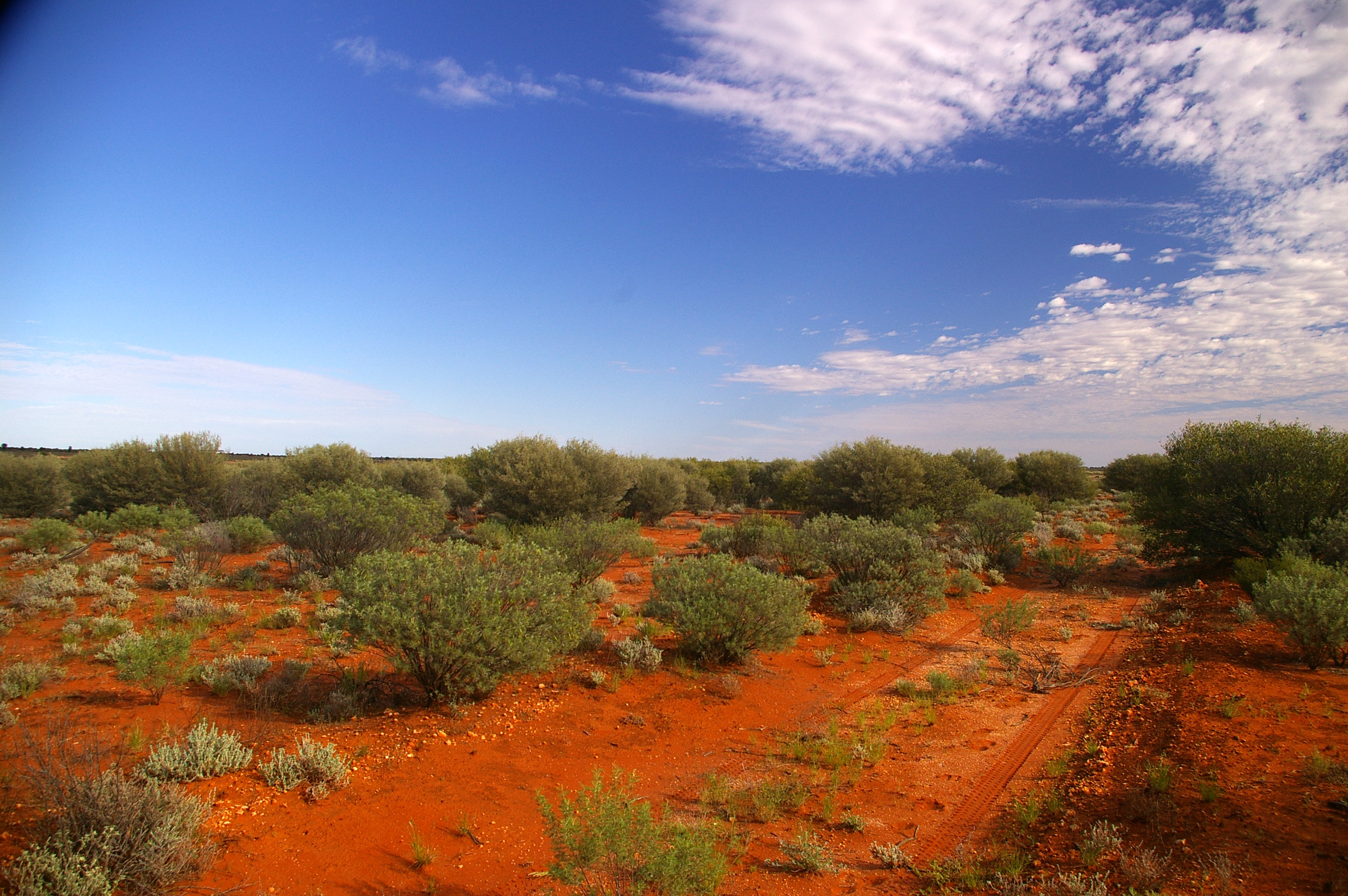
Example of habitat of the Forrest's mouse

A nocturnal and terrestrial animal, the Forrest's mouse shelters during the day in a grass nest in shallow burrows (possibly at the base of spinifex tussocks), and also in cracks in the soil.

Although little is known on the population dynamics and social organisation of the species, it is thought they are a solitary animal, occurring in low densities regardless of habitat suitability. Individuals have been recorded entering a state of torpor in both captivity and the wild, and longevity is estimated to be 1.5 to 2 years.

Habitats are varied and include: riparian coolabah forest, tussock grassland, stony saltbush plains, mulga and savannah woodlands, chenopod shrubland and sandy ridges, and cracking clay pans.

== Reproduction ==
The reproductive rate of Forrest's mouse peaks during winter and spring, with some breeding occurring in autumn, and thought to be related to rainfall. Litter size is usually of three to four young, with a gestation period of 35 days, and a weaning period of 28 days, when the young reach around 9 grams (0.32 oz) in weight. It is unclear as to the age at which individuals reach sexual maturity.

== Diet ==
The Forrest's mouse has a varied diet, and is considered an omnivore. Food items identified include seeds, green plant stems and leaves, arthropods including beetles and spiders, and fungi. Assessment of stomach contents concluded the major food item was seed (47%), followed by arthropods at 27%, with the remainder consisting of stem and leaf material. It is generally thought that the Forrest's mouse does not rely on standing water for drinking, as it obtains sufficient moisture from its diet in a similar fashion to other well adapted desert rodents.

== Predators ==
The Forrest's mouse is subject to predation by both introduced animals and native predators. Both feral cats Felis catus and the European red fox Vulpes vulpes have been recorded as preying on the Forrest's mouse in Queensland, which has been identified as a contributing factor in the decline of native rodents. The barn owl Tyto alba is known to prey on the species in South Australia, and other birds of prey recorded consuming the Forrest's mouse include the letter-winged kite Elanus scriptus in the Simpson Desert. In assessing the risk of dingo Canis lupus dingo predation to threatened vertebrates in western NSW after re-introduction, it was found that the Forrest's mouse faced a high risk of predation from dingoes, based on bodyweight, behaviour and habitat.

== Threats ==
Heavy grazing and the trampling of habitat by domestic stock, feral goats, rabbits and pigs has been identified as a threat to the Forrest's mouse. Grazing by stock affects native rodents through the removal of shrubs and grasses that provide food and shelter, and powder and compact the topsoil, which makes burrowing difficult or impossible. This can also make the Forrest's mouse more vulnerable to predation, and reduces the ability to move between isolated habitats.

Predation by feral cats and foxes is considered a threat to the Forrest's mouse, and exotic species such as the house mouse Mus domesticus have the ability to sustain the population of predators. The house mouse, along with other introduced herbivores compete with the Forrest's mouse for food resources and habitat.

The loss of habitat through inappropriate or altered fire regimes is recognised as a threatening process for native rodents, however it is unclear as to whether the Forrest's mouse is adversely affected by current fire regimes, or what requirements are needed in terms of fire history.

The use of 1080 poison(sodium monofluoroacetate) in pest control has the potential to poison the Forrest's mouse through the ingestion of baits, and the use of pesticides for the control of locusts may also represent a threat.

The introduction of standing water through farm dams and irrigation schemes has the potential to attract potential predators and competitors of the Forrest's mouse, and serve as focal point for herbivores and the modification of vegetation through grazing.

A loss of habitat through the clearing of trees, shrubs and grasses, the removal of ground debris and loss of hollows have also been identified as a threat to the survival of the Forrest's mouse.
