= Gray-bellied tree mouse =

Conservation status
- Least Concern (IUCN 3.1)

Scientific classification
- Kingdom: Animalia
- Phylum: Chordata
- Class: Mammalia
- Order: Rodentia
- Family: Muridae
- Genus: Pogonomys
- Species: P. sylvestris

Binomial name
- Pogonomys sylvestris Thomas, 1920

Species of mammal

The gray-bellied tree mouse (Pogonomys sylvestris) is a species of rodent in the family Muridae. It is found only in Papua New Guinea.

It is consumed by the Kalam people of Papua New Guinea, and is hunted by women who look for it in its burrows.
