= Kakadu pebble-mound mouse =

Scientific classification
- Kingdom: Animalia
- Phylum: Chordata
- Class: Mammalia
- Order: Rodentia
- Family: Muridae
- Genus: Pseudomys
- Species: P. calabyi

Binomial name
- Pseudomys calabyi Kitchener & Humphreys, 1987

Species of mammal

The Kakadu pebble-mound mouse (Pseudomys calabyi) is a rodent native to Australia. It is one of the pebble-mound mice.
