= Country mouse =

Conservation status
- Least Concern (IUCN 3.1)
- Least Concern (NCA)

Scientific classification
- Kingdom: Animalia
- Phylum: Chordata
- Class: Mammalia
- Order: Rodentia
- Family: Muridae
- Genus: Pseudomys
- Species: P. patrius

Binomial name
- Pseudomys patrius (Thomas & Dollman, 1909)

Species of rodent

The country mouse (Pseudomys patrius) also known as the pebble-mound mouse or eastern pebble mound mouse is a species of rodent in the family Muridae. It is endemic to Queensland. It was described by Thomas and Dollman in 1909.

Like other pebble-mound mice, it is known for building shallow burrows with mounds of pebbles surrounding the entrances. This function is understood to be protective and collects dew. In Queensland the observed mounds in coastal areas are smaller than in drier habitats, reflecting the need to collect more of the scarcer water. The mouse lines the tunnel walls with pebbles for insulation and protection. It plugs smaller openings to the burrow system with a pebble, camouflaging the entrance, and unplugs it to exit in times of danger.

Under the Nature Conservation Act 1992, it has been assessed as Least Concern.
