= List of placental mammals introduced to Australia =

A variety of placental mammals have been introduced to Australia since the arrival of Captain Cook in 1770. They have ranged in size from rodents to deer.

This is a sub-list of the list of mammals of Australia. Note that this sub-list includes six species of introduced rodent that are also included in the rodents of Australia sub-list.

== Rodentia ==
=== Muridae ===
- House mouse, Mus musculus
- Pacific rat, Rattus exulans
- Brown rat, Rattus norvegicus
- Black rat, Rattus rattus

=== Sciuridae ===
- Five-lined palm squirrel, Funambulus pennantii
- Eastern grey squirrel, Sciurus carolinensis (extirpated)

== Lagomorpha ==
=== Leporidae ===
- European rabbit, Oryctolagus cuniculus
- European hare, Lepus europaeus

== Carnivora ==
=== Canidae ===
- Dingo, Canis familiaris
- Red fox, Vulpes vulpes

=== Felidae ===
- Cat, Felis catus

== Artiodactyla ==
=== Cervidae ===
- Chital, Axis axis
- Indian hog deer, Axis porcinus
- Red deer, Cervus elaphus
- European fallow deer, Dama dama
- Rusa deer, Rusa timorensis
- Sambar deer, Rusa unicolor

=== Bovidae ===
- Blackbuck, Antilope cervicapra (extirpated)
- Goat, Capra hircus
- Zebu, Bos indicus
- Cattle, Bos taurus
- Banteng, Bos javanicus
- Water buffalo, Bubalus bubalis

=== Camelidae ===
- Dromedary, Camelus dromedarius

=== Suidae ===
- Feral pig, Sus domesticus

== Perissodactyla ==
=== Equidae ===
- Brumby, Equus ferus caballus
- Donkey, Equus africanus asinus

== See also ==
- Invasive species in Australia
- List of mammals of Australia
  - List of monotremes and marsupials of Australia
  - List of bats of Australia
  - List of rodents of Australia
  - List of marine mammals of Australia
