= Prehensile-tailed rat =

Scientific classification
- Domain: Eukaryota
- Kingdom: Animalia
- Phylum: Chordata
- Class: Mammalia
- Order: Rodentia
- Family: Muridae
- Genus: Pogonomys
- Species: P. mollipilosus

Binomial name
- Pogonomys mollipilosus Peters & Doria, 1881

Species of rodent

The prehensile-tailed rat (Pogonomys mollipilosus) is a species of rodent that can be found in New Guinea and Australia; it occurs in the tropical rainforest of Queensland.
