= List of mammals of Heard Island and McDonald Islands =

This is a list of the mammal species recorded in Heard Island and McDonald Islands. There are approximately 29 mammal species in Heard Island and McDonald Islands.

The following tags are used to highlight each species' conservation status as assessed by the International Union for Conservation of Nature:

| EX | Extinct | No reasonable doubt that the last individual has died. |
| EW | Extinct in the wild | Known only to survive in captivity or as a naturalized populations well outside its previous range. |
| CR | Critically endangered | The species is in imminent risk of extinction in the wild. |
| EN | Endangered | The species is facing an extremely high risk of extinction in the wild. |
| VU | Vulnerable | The species is facing a high risk of extinction in the wild. |
| NT | Near threatened | The species does not meet any of the criteria that would categorise it as risking extinction but it is likely to do so in the future. |
| LC | Least concern | There are no current identifiable risks to the species. |
| DD | Data deficient | There is inadequate information to make an assessment of the risks to this species. |

== Infraorder: Cetacea (whales) ==
Orca

The infraorder Cetacea includes whales, dolphins and porpoises. They are the mammals most fully adapted to aquatic life with a spindle-shaped nearly hairless body, protected by a thick layer of blubber, and forelimbs and tail modified to provide propulsion under water.

- Parvorder: Odontoceti
  - Family: Delphinidae (marine dolphins)
    - Genus: Globicephala
      - Long-finned pilot whale, Globicephala melas LC
    - Genus: Grampus
      - Risso's dolphin, Grampus griseus
    - Genus: Lagenorhynchus
      - Hourglass dolphin, Lagenorhynchus cruciger
      - Dusky dolphin, Lagenorhynchus obscurus
    - Genus: Lissodelphis
      - Southern right whale dolphin, Lissodelphis peronii
    - Genus: Orcinus
      - Orca, Orcinus orca DD
    - Genus: Tursiops
      - Bottlenose dolphin, Tursiops truncatus
  - Family: Phocoenidae
    - Genus: Phocoena
      - Spectacled porpoise, Phocoena dioptrica LC
  - Family: Physeteridae
    - Genus: Physeter
      - Sperm whale, Physeter macrocephalus
  - Family: Ziphiidae
    - Genus: Berardius
      - Arnoux's beaked whale, Berardius arnuxii LC
    - Genus: Hyperoodon
      - Southern bottlenose whale, Hyperoodon planifrons
    - Genus: Mesoplodon
      - Gray's beaked whale, Mesoplodon grayi LC
      - Hector's beaked whale, Mesoplodon hectori
      - Layard's beaked whale or strap-toothed whale, Mesoplodon layardii LC
    - Genus: Ziphius
      - Cuvier's beaked whale or goose-beaked whale, Ziphius cavirostris
- Parvorder: Mysticeti
  - Family: Balaenopteridae
    - Genus: Balaenoptera
      - Common minke whale, Balaenoptera acutorostrata
      - Antarctic minke whale, Balaenoptera bonarensis
      - Sei whale, Balaenoptera borealis. Listed as vulnerable under the EPBC Act.
      - Blue whale, Balaenoptera musculus. Listed as endangered under the EPBC Act.
      - Fin whale, Balaenoptera physalus. VU. Listed as vulnerable under the EPBC Act.
    - Genus: Megaptera
      - Humpback whale, Megaptera noveangliae. LC. Listed as vulnerable under the EPBC Act.
  - Family: Balaenidae
    - Genus: Eubalaena
      - Southern right whale, Eubalaena australis. Listed as endangered under the EPBC Act.

== Order: Carnivora (carnivorans) ==
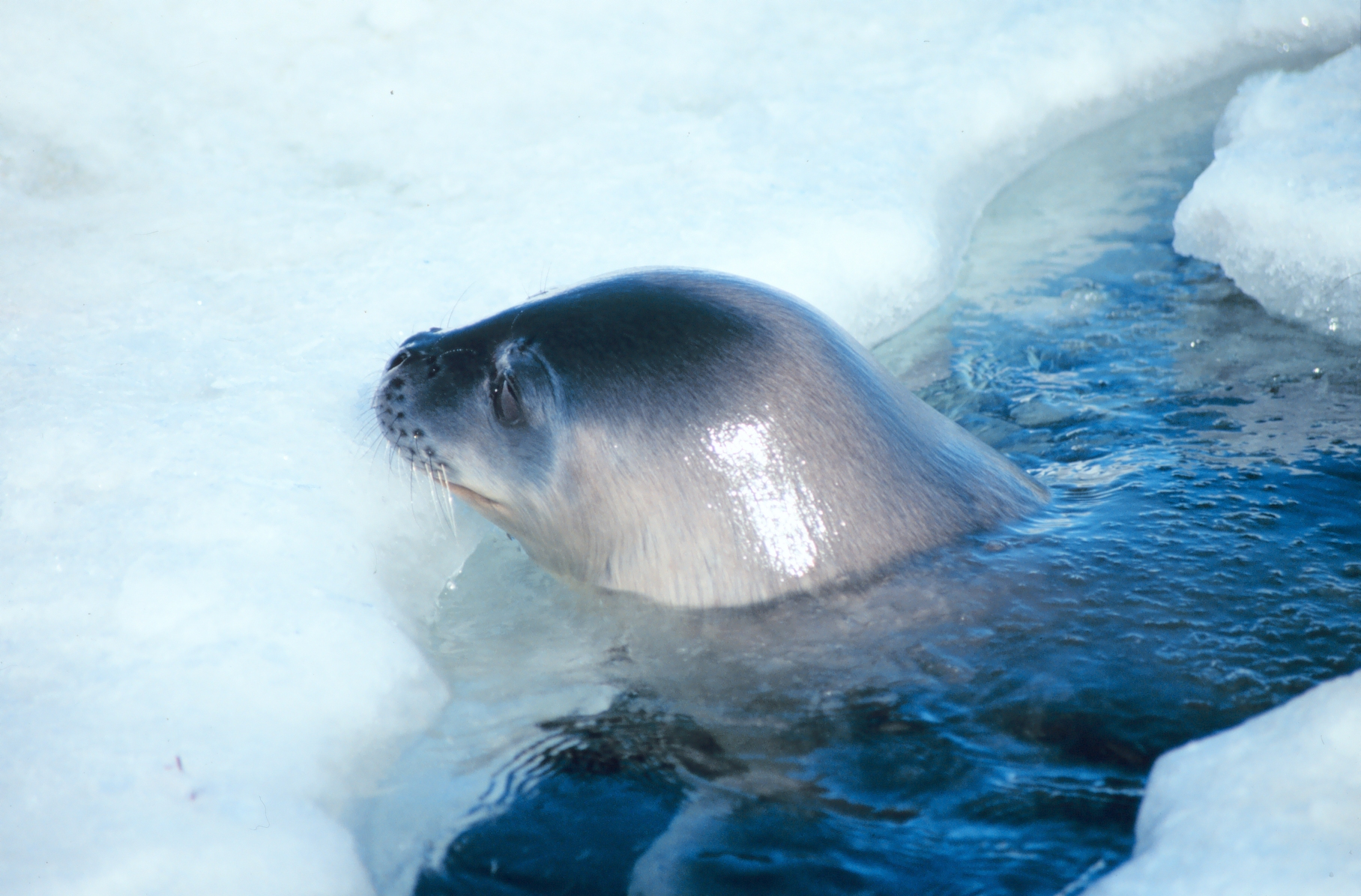
Weddell seal

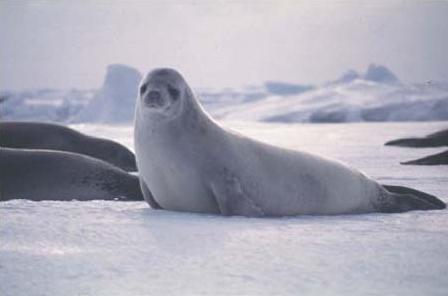
Crabeater seal

There are over 260 species of carnivorans, the majority of which feed primarily on meat. They have a characteristic skull shape and dentition.

- Suborder: Caniformia
  - Family: Otariidae (eared seals, sealions)
    - Genus: Arctocephalus
      - Antarctic fur seal, Arctocephalus gazella LC
      - Subantarctic fur seal, Arctocephalus tropicalis LC. Listed as endangered under the EPBC Act.
  - Family: Phocidae (earless seals)
    - Genus: Hydrurga
      - Leopard seal, Hydrurga leptonyx LC
    - Genus: Leptonychotes
      - Weddell seal, Leptonychotes weddellii LC
    - Genus: Lobodon
      - Crabeater seal, Lobodon carcinophagus LC
    - Genus: Mirounga
      - Southern elephant seal, Mirounga leonina LC. Listed as vulnerable under the EPBC Act.
    - Genus: Ommatophoca
      - Ross seal, Ommatophoca rossii LC

== See also ==
- Antarctic realm
- Fauna of Heard Island and McDonald Islands
- List of chordate orders
- Lists of mammals by region
- List of prehistoric mammals
- Mammal classification
- List of mammals described in the 2000s
