= Central pebble-mound mouse =

Conservation status
- Least Concern (IUCN 3.1)

Scientific classification
- Kingdom: Animalia
- Phylum: Chordata
- Class: Mammalia
- Order: Rodentia
- Family: Muridae
- Genus: Pseudomys
- Species: P. johnsoni

Binomial name
- Pseudomys johnsoni Kitchener, 1985

Synonyms
- Pseudomys laborifex Kitchener & Humphreys, 1986

Species of rodent

The central pebble-mound mouse (Pseudomys johnsoni) is a species of rodent in the family Muridae, native to Australia. The Kimberley mouse (Pseudomys laborifex) was, until recently, considered distinct from P. johnsoni, but they are now known to be conspecific. It is one of the pebble-mound mice.
