= List of monotremes and marsupials of Australia =

Mammals are divided into two subclasses based on reproductive techniques: egg laying mammals (the monotremes), and live birth mammals. The second subclass is divided into two infraclasses: pouched mammals (the marsupials) and placental mammals.

Australia is home to two of the five extant species of monotremes and the majority of the world's marsupials (the remainder are from Papua New Guinea, eastern Indonesia, Timor-Leste and the Americas). The taxonomy is somewhat fluid; this list generally follows Menkhorst and Knight and Van Dyck and Strahan, with some input from the global list, which is derived from Gardner and Groves.

This is a sub-list of the list of mammals of Australia.

Conservation status listed follows the IUCN Red List of Threatened Species (v. 2013.2; data current at 5 March 2014):
EX - extinct
EW - extinct in the wild
CR - critically endangered
EN - endangered
VU - vulnerable
NT - near threatened
LC - least concern
DD - data deficient
NE - not evaluated

== Monotremata (monotremes) ==
=== Ornithorhynchidae ===
- Platypus, Ornithorhynchus anatinus NT

=== Tachyglossidae ===
- Short-beaked echidna, Tachyglossus aculeatus LC

== Marsupialia (marsupials) ==
=== Dasyuromorphia (marsupial carnivores) ===
==== Thylacinidae ====
- Thylacine, Thylacinus cynocephalus EX - extinct

==== Dasyuridae ====
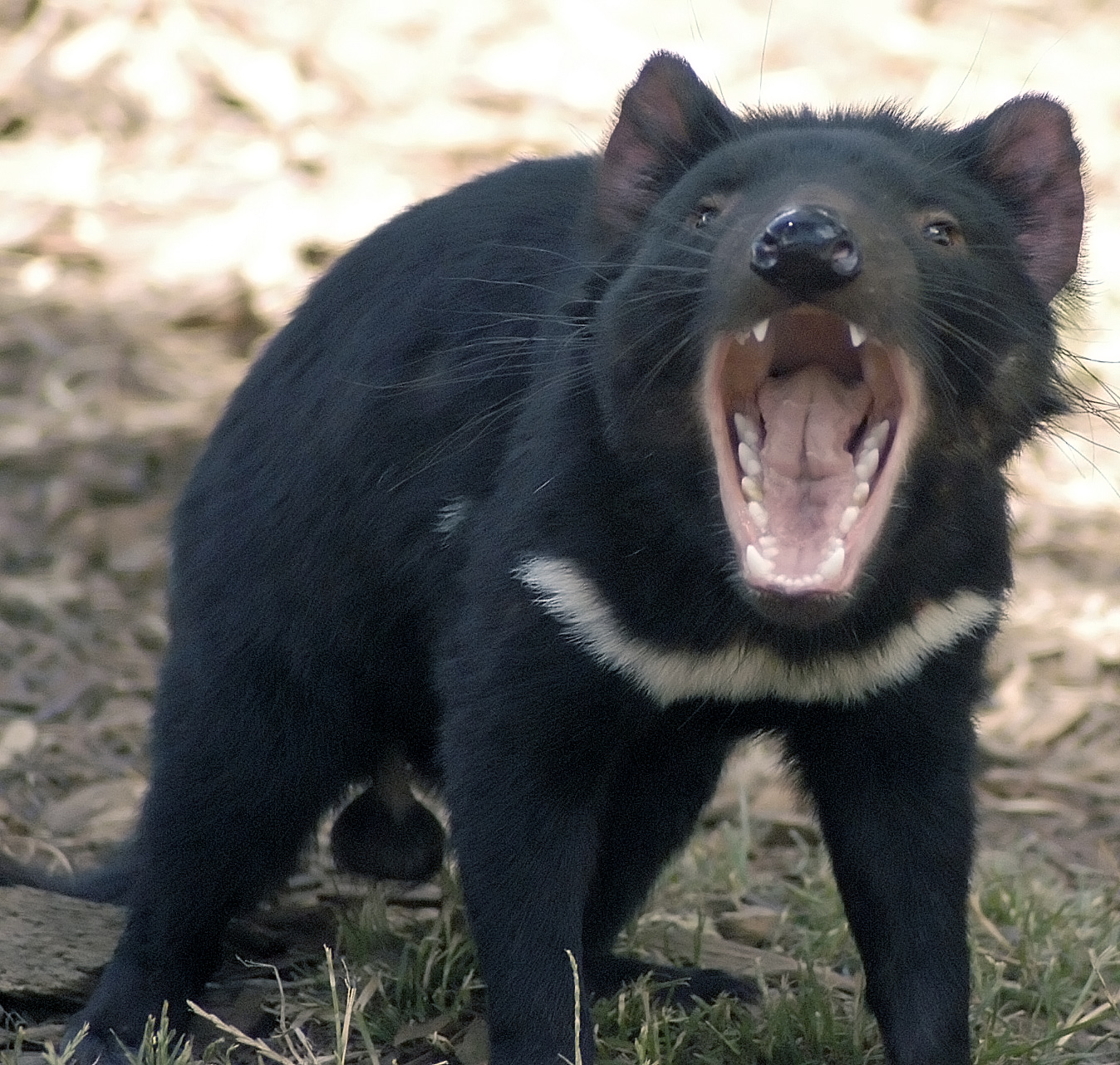
Tasmanian devil

- Tropical antechinus, Antechinus adustus LC
- Agile antechinus, Antechinus agilis LC
- Fawn antechinus, Antechinus bellus LC
- Yellow-footed antechinus, Antechinus flavipes LC
- Atherton antechinus, Antechinus godmani NT
- Cinnamon antechinus, Antechinus leo LC
- Swamp antechinus, Antechinus minimus LC
- Brown antechinus, Antechinus stuartii LC
- Subtropical antechinus, Antechinus subtropicus LC
- Dusky antechinus, Antechinus swainsonii LC
- Brush-tailed mulgara, Dasycercus blythi LC
- Crest-tailed mulgara, Dasycercus cristicauda LC
- Kaluta, Dasykaluta rosamondae LC
- Kowari, Dasyuroides byrnei VU
- Western quoll, Dasyurus geoffroii NT
- Northern quoll, Dasyurus hallucatus EN
- Tiger quoll, Dasyurus maculatus NT
- Eastern quoll, Dasyurus viverrinus NT
- Wongai ningaui, Ningaui ridei LC
- Pilbara ningaui, Ningaui timealeyi LC
- Mallee ningaui, Ningaui yvonneae LC
- Dibbler, Parantechinus apicalis EN
- Red-tailed phascogale, Phascogale calura NT
- Brush-tailed phascogale, Phascogale tapoatafa NT
  - Brush-tailed phascogale, Phascogale (tapoatafa) pirata VU
- Kultarr, Antechinomys laniger LC
- Paucident planigale, Planigale gilesi LC
- Long-tailed planigale, Planigale ingrami LC
- Common planigale, Planigale maculata LC
- Narrow-nosed planigale, Planigale tenuirostris LC
- Sandstone false antechinus, Pseudantechinus bilarni NT
- Fat-tailed false antechinus, Pseudantechinus macdonnellensis LC
- Alexandria false antechinus, Pseudantechinus mimulus EN
- Ningbing false antechinus, Pseudantechinus ningbing LC
- Rory Cooper's false antechinus, Pseudantechinus roryi LC
- Woolley's false antechinus, Pseudantechinus woolleyae LC
- Tasmanian devil, Sarcophilus harrisii EN
- Fat-tailed dunnart, Sminthopsis crassicaudata LC
- Kakadu dunnart, Sminthopsis bindi LC
- Carpentarian dunnart, Sminthopsis butleri VU
- Julia Creek dunnart, Sminthopsis douglasi NT
- Stripe-faced dunnart, Sminthopsis macroura LC
- Red-cheeked dunnart, Sminthopsis virginiae LC
- White-tailed dunnart, Sminthopsis granulipes LC
- Kangaroo Island dunnart, Sminthopsis aitkeni CR
- Grey-bellied dunnart, Sminthopsis griseoventer (including S. (griseoventer) boullangerensis: LC)
- Boullanger Island dunnart, Sminthopsis boullangerensis (formerly S. griseoventer boullangerensis)
- Long-tailed dunnart, Sminthopsis longicaudata LC
- Chestnut dunnart, Sminthopsis archeri DD
- Little long-tailed dunnart, Sminthopsis dolichura LC
- Sooty dunnart, Sminthopsis fuliginosus DD
- Gilbert's dunnart, Sminthopsis gilberti LC
- White-footed dunnart, Sminthopsis leucopus VU
- Slender-tailed dunnart, Sminthopsis murina LC
- Hairy-footed dunnart, Sminthopsis hirtipes LC
- Ooldea dunnart, Sminthopsis ooldea LC
- Sandhill dunnart, Sminthopsis psammophila EN
- Lesser hairy-footed dunnart, Sminthopsis youngsoni LC

==== Myrmecobiidae ====
- Numbat, Myrmecobius fasciatus EN

=== Peramelemorphia (bandicoots, bilbies) ===
==== Chaeropodidae ====
- Pig-footed bandicoot, Chaeropus ecaudatus EX - extinct

==== Peroryctidae ====
- Rufous spiny bandicoot, Echymipera rufescens LC

==== Peramelidae ====
- Golden bandicoot, Isoodon auratus VU
- Northern brown bandicoot, Isoodon macrourus LC
- Southern brown bandicoot, Isoodon obesulus LC
- Western barred bandicoot, Perameles bougainville EN
- Desert bandicoot, Perameles eremiana EX - extinct
- Eastern barred bandicoot, Perameles gunnii NT
- Long-nosed bandicoot, Perameles nasuta LC

==== Thylacomyidae ====
- Bilby, Macrotis lagotis VU
- Lesser bilby, Macrotis leucura EX - extinct

=== Notoryctemorphia (marsupial moles) ===
==== Notoryctidae ====
- Northern marsupial mole, Notoryctes caurinus DD
- Southern marsupial mole, Notoryctes typhlops DD

=== Diprotodontia ===
==== Vombatiformes (wombats, koalas) ====
===== Vombatidae =====
- Northern hairy-nosed wombat, Lasiorhinus krefftii CR
- Southern hairy-nosed wombat, Lasiorhinus latifrons LC
- Common wombat, Vombatus ursinus LC

===== Phascolarctidae =====
- Koala, Phascolarctos cinereus VU

==== Phalangeriformes (possums, gliders) ====
===== Phalangeridae =====
- Southern common cuscus, Phalanger mimicus LC
- Common spotted cuscus, Spilocuscus maculatus LC
- Northern brushtail possum, Trichosurus arnhemensis
- Short-eared possum, Trichosurus caninus LC
- Mountain brushtail possum, Trichosurus cunninghami LC
- Common brushtail possum, Trichosurus vulpecula LC
- Coppery brushtail possum, Trichosurus johnstonii
- Scaly-tailed possum, Wyulda squamicaudata DD

===== Burramyidae =====
- Mountain pygmy possum, Burramys parvus CR
- Long-tailed pygmy possum, Cercartetus caudatus LC
- Southwestern pygmy possum, Cercartetus concinnus LC
- Tasmanian pygmy possum, Cercartetus lepidus LC
- Eastern pygmy possum, Cercartetus nanus LC

===== Tarsipedidae =====
- Honey possum, Tarsipes rostratus LC

===== Petauridae =====
- Striped possum, Dactylopsila trivirgata LC
- Leadbeater's possum, Gymnobelideus leadbeateri CR
- Yellow-bellied glider, Petaurus australis LC
- Sugar glider, Petaurus breviceps LC
- Mahogany glider, Petaurus gracilis EN
- Squirrel glider, Petaurus norfolcensis LC

===== Pseudocheiridae =====
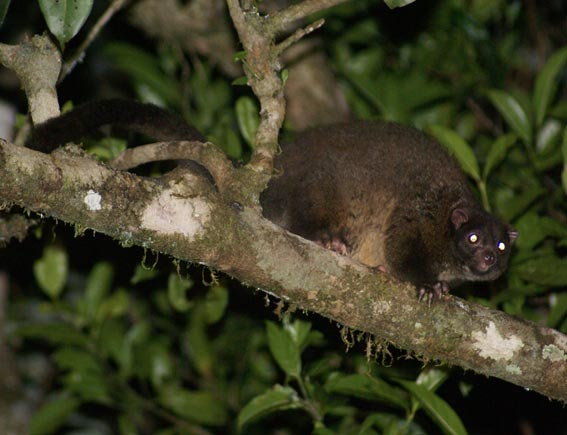
Lemuroid ringtail possum

- Lemuroid ringtail possum, Hemibelideus lemuroides NT
- Greater glider, Petauroides volans LC
- Rock ringtail possum, Petropseudes dahli LC
- Common ringtail possum, Pseudocheirus peregrinus LC
- Western ringtail possum, Pseudocheirus (peregrinus) occidentalis VU
- Green ringtail possum, Pseudochirops archeri LC
- Daintree River ringtail possum, Pseudochirulus cinereus LC
- Herbert River ringtail possum, Pseudochirulus herbertensis LC

===== Acrobatidae =====
- Feathertail glider, Acrobates pygmaeus LC

==== Macropodiformes (kangaroos, wallabies) ====
===== Hypsiprymnodontidae =====
- Musky rat-kangaroo, Hypsiprymnodon moschatus LC

===== Potoroidae =====
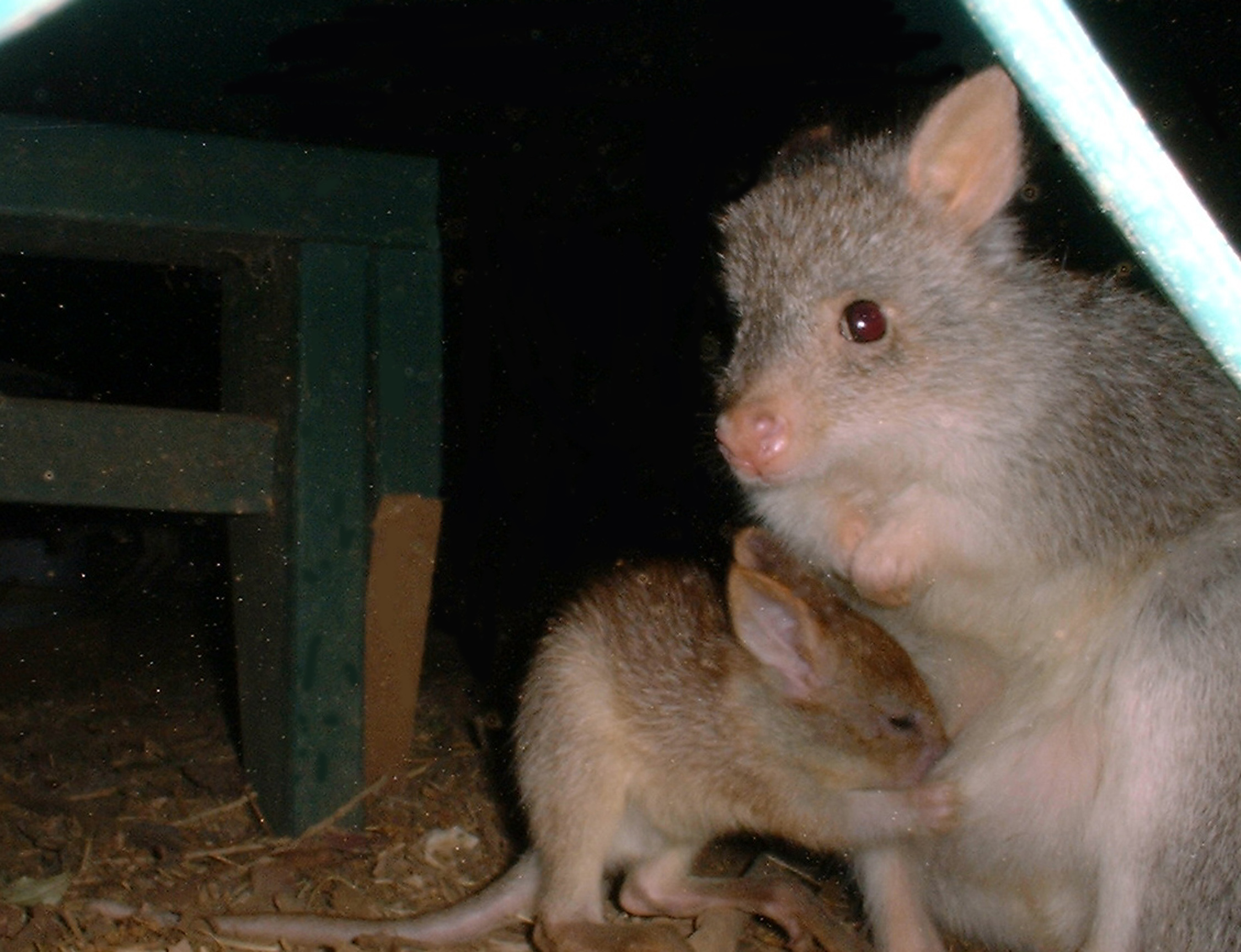
Rufous bettong

- Rufous bettong, Aepyprymnus rufescens LC
- Southern bettong, Bettongia gaimardi NT
- Burrowing bettong, Bettongia lesueur NT
- Woylie, Bettongia penicillata CR
- Northern bettong, Bettongia tropica EN
- Nullarbor dwarf bettong, Bettongia pusilla EX - extinct
- Desert rat-kangaroo, Caloprymnus campestris EX - extinct
- Gilbert's potoroo, Potorous gilbertii CR
- Long-footed potoroo, Potorous longipes EN
- Broad-faced potoroo, Potorous platyops EX - extinct
- Long-nosed potoroo, Potorous tridactylus LC

===== Macropodidae =====
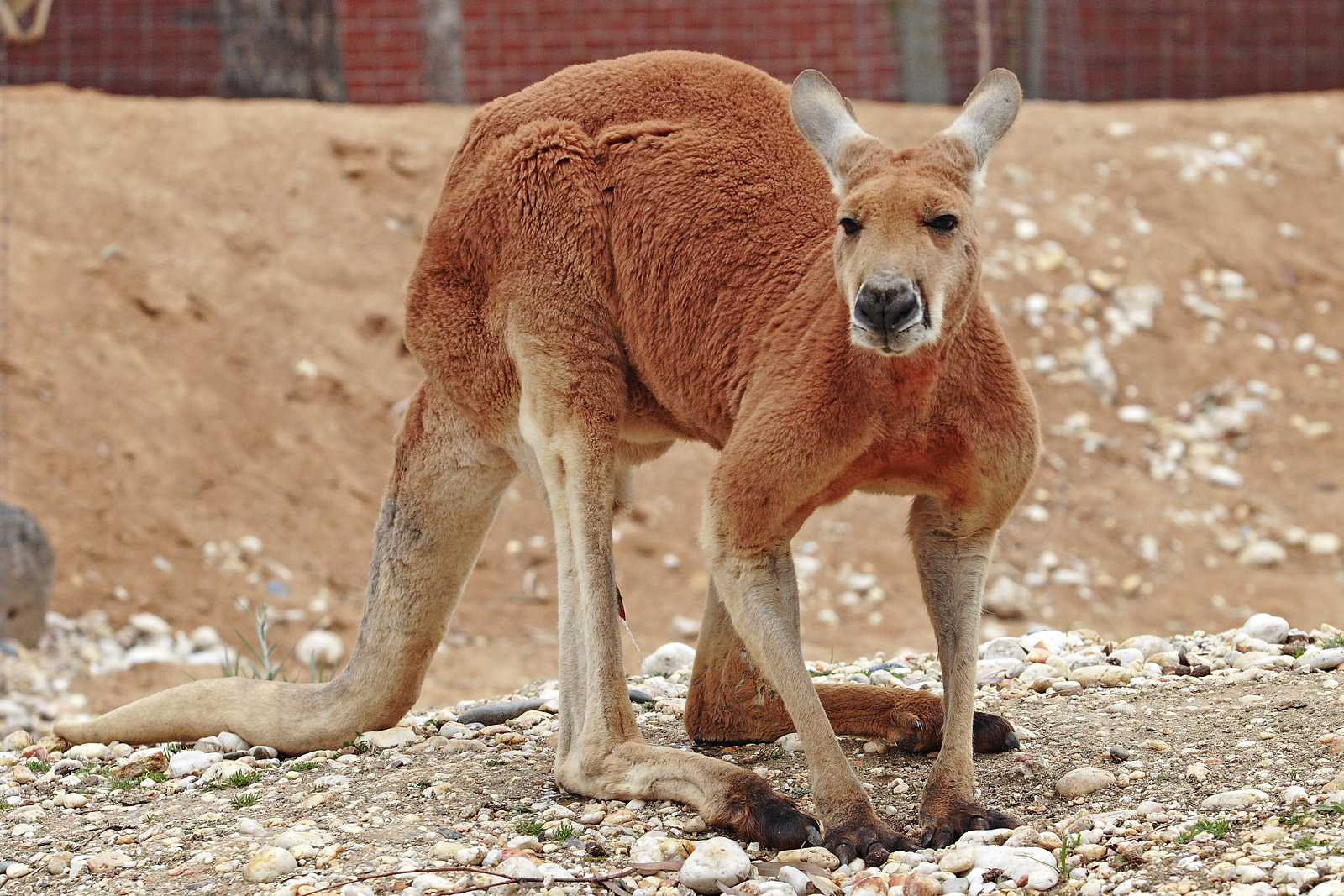
Red kangaroo

- Bennett's tree-kangaroo, Dendrolagus bennettianus NT
- Lumholtz's tree-kangaroo, Dendrolagus lumholtzi LC
- Central hare-wallaby, Lagorchestes asomatus EX - extinct
- Spectacled hare-wallaby, Lagorchestes conspicillatus LC
- Mala, Lagorchestes hirsutus VU
- Eastern hare-wallaby, Lagorchestes leporides EX - extinct
- Banded hare-wallaby, Lagostrophus fasciatus VU
- Western grey kangaroo, Macropus fuliginosus LC
- Eastern grey kangaroo, Macropus giganteus LC
- Agile wallaby, Notamacropus agilis LC
- Black-striped wallaby, Notamacropus dorsalis LC
- Tammar wallaby, Notamacropus eugenii LC
- Toolache wallaby, Notamacropus greyi EX - extinct
- Western brush wallaby, Notamacropus irma LC
- Parma wallaby, Notamacropus parma NT
- Whiptail wallaby, Notamacropus parryi LC
- Red-necked wallaby, Notamacropus rufogriseus LC
- Bridled nail-tail wallaby, Onychogalea fraenata EN
- Crescent nail-tail wallaby, Onychogalea lunata EX - extinct
- Northern nail-tail wallaby, Onychogalea unguifera LC
- Antilopine kangaroo, Osphranter antilopinus LC
- Black wallaroo, Osphranter bernardus NT
- Common wallaroo or euro, Osphranter robustus LC
- Red kangaroo, Osphranter rufus LC
- Allied rock-wallaby, Petrogale assimilis LC
- Short-eared rock-wallaby, Petrogale brachyotis LC
- Monjon, Petrogale burbidgei NT
- Cape York rock-wallaby, Petrogale coenensis NT
- Nabarlek, Petrogale concinna DD
- Godman's rock-wallaby, Petrogale godmani LC
- Herbert's rock-wallaby, Petrogale herberti LC
- Unadorned rock-wallaby, Petrogale inornata LC
- Black-flanked rock-wallaby, Petrogale lateralis NT
- Purple-necked rock-wallaby, Petrogale purpureicollis LC
- Mareeba rock-wallaby, Petrogale mareeba LC
- Brush-tailed rock-wallaby, Petrogale penicillata NT
- Proserpine rock-wallaby, Petrogale persephone EN
- Rothschild's rock-wallaby, Petrogale rothschildi LC
- Sharman's rock-wallaby, Petrogale sharmani NT
- Yellow-footed rock-wallaby, Petrogale xanthopus NT
- Quokka, Setonix brachyurus VU
- Tasmanian pademelon, Thylogale billardierii LC
- Red-legged pademelon, Thylogale stigmatica LC
- Red-necked pademelon, Thylogale thetis LC
- Swamp wallaby, Wallabia bicolor LC

== See also ==
- List of mammals of Australia
  - List of bats of Australia
  - List of rodents of Australia
  - List of placental mammals introduced to Australia
  - List of marine mammals of Australia
- Global list of monotremes and marsupials
