= Large tree mouse =

Conservation status
- Least Concern (IUCN 3.1)

Scientific classification
- Domain: Eukaryota
- Kingdom: Animalia
- Phylum: Chordata
- Class: Mammalia
- Order: Rodentia
- Family: Muridae
- Genus: Pogonomys
- Species: P. loriae

Binomial name
- Pogonomys loriae Thomas, 1897

Species of rodent

The large tree mouse (Pogonomys loriae) is a species of rodent in the family Muridae. It is found on the island of New Guinea (Indonesia and Papua New Guinea).
