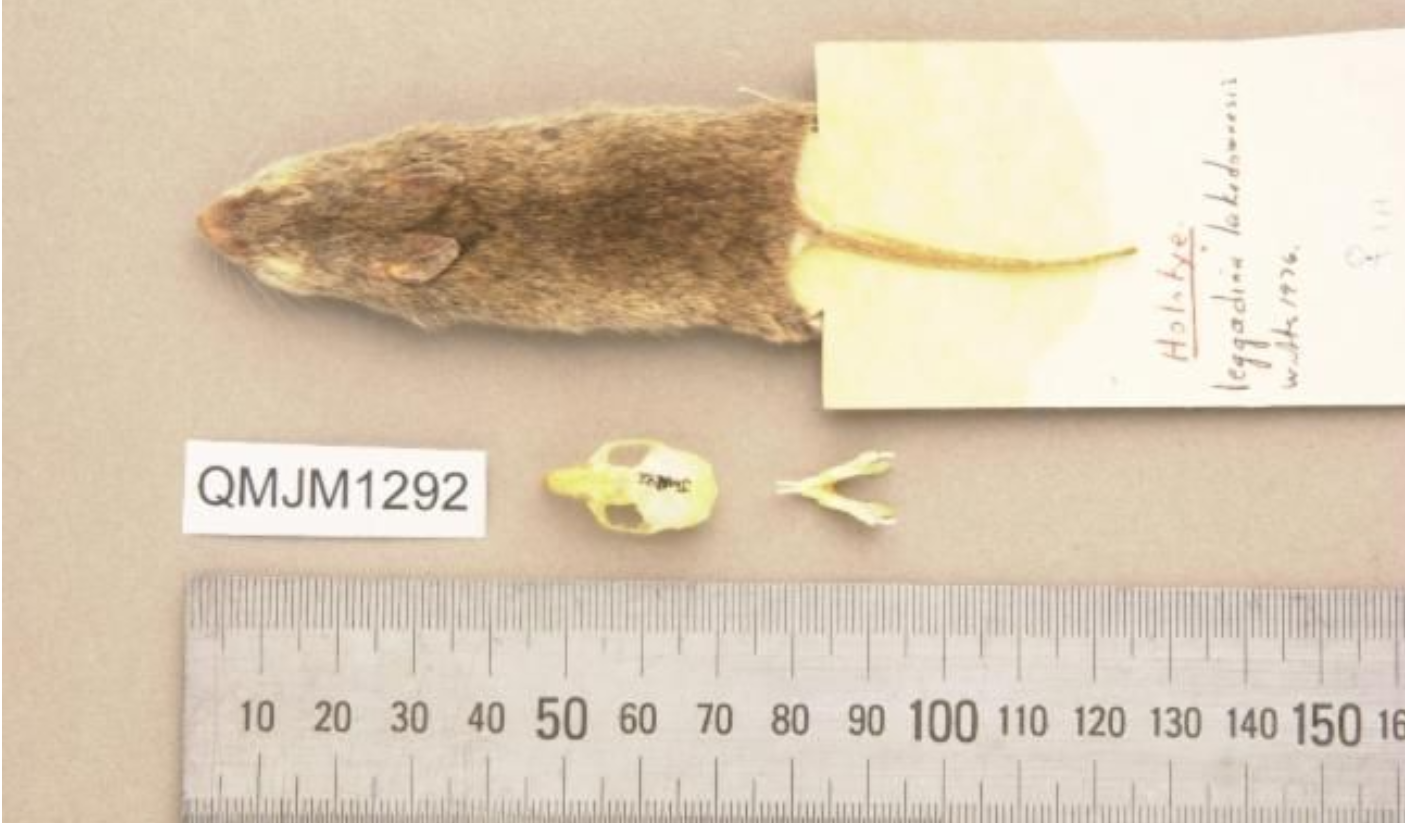

Conservation status
- Least Concern (IUCN 3.1)

Scientific classification
- Kingdom: Animalia
- Phylum: Chordata
- Class: Mammalia
- Order: Rodentia
- Family: Muridae
- Genus: Leggadina
- Species: L. lakedownensis

Binomial name
- Leggadina lakedownensis Watts, 1976
- Holotype site (QM: JM1292)

= Lakeland Downs mouse =

Species of rodent

The Lakeland Downs mouse (Leggadina lakedownensis) is a species of rodent in the family Muridae. It is endemic to the Cape York Peninsula of northern Australia. Its natural habitat is dry savanna.

It was first described in 1976 by Chris H.S. Watts.
