= List of marine mammals of Australia =

This is the list of marine mammals found in Australian waters. It is a sub-list of the list of mammals of Australia.

Conservation status listed follows the IUCN Red List of Threatened Species (v. 2013.2; data current at 3 March 2014):

EX – extinct

EW – extinct in the wild
CR – critically endangered
EN – endangered
VU – vulnerable
NT – near threatened
LC – least concern
DD – data deficient

NE – not evaluated

== Cetacea ==
=== Balaenidae ===
- Southern right whale, Eubalaena australis LC

==== Balaenopteridae ====
- Minke whale, Balaenoptera acutorostrata LC
- Southern minke whale, Balaenoptera bonaerensis DD
- Sei whale, Balaenoptera borealis EN
- Pygmy Bryde's whale, Balaenoptera edeni DD
- Omura's whale, Balaenoptera omurai DD
- Blue whale, Balaenoptera musculus EN (ssp. brevicauda – pygmy blue whale: DD, ssp. intermedia: CR)
- Fin whale, Balaenoptera physalus EN
- Humpback whale, Megaptera novaeangliae LC (Oceania subpopulation: EN)

==== Delphinidae ====
- Short-beaked common dolphin, Delphinus delphis LC
- Pygmy killer whale, Feresa attenuata DD
- Short-finned pilot whale, Globicephala macrorhynchus DD
- Long-finned pilot whale, Globicephala melas DD
- Risso's dolphin, Grampus griseus LC
- Fraser's dolphin, Lagenodelphis hosei LC
- Hourglass dolphin, Sagmatias cruciger LC
- Dusky dolphin, Sagmatias obscurus DD
- Southern right whale dolphin, Lissodelphis peronii DD
- Irrawaddy dolphin, Orcaella brevirostris VU
- Australian snubfin dolphin, Orcaella heinsohni NT
- Orca (killer whale), Orcinus orca DD
- Melon-headed whale, Peponocephala electra LC
- False killer whale, Pseudorca crassidens NT
- Indo-Pacific humpback dolphin, Sousa chinensis VU
- Pantropical spotted dolphin, Stenella attenuata LC
- Striped dolphin, Stenella coeruleoalba LC
- Spinner dolphin, Stenella longirostris DD
- Rough-toothed dolphin, Steno bredanensis LC
- Indo-Pacific bottlenose dolphin, Tursiops aduncus DD
- Burrunan dolphin, Tursiops australis (T. truncatus: LC, T. aduncus: DD)
- Bottlenose dolphin, Tursiops truncatus LC

==== Kogiidae ====
- Pygmy sperm whale, Kogia breviceps DD
- Dwarf sperm whale, Kogia simus DD

==== Neobalaenidae ====
- Pygmy right whale, Caperea marginata DD

==== Phocoenidae ====
- Spectacled porpoise, Phocoena dioptrica DD

==== Physeteridae ====
- Sperm whale, Physeter macrocephalus VU

==== Ziphiidae ====
- Arnoux's beaked whale, Berardius arnuxii DD
- Southern bottlenose whale, Hyperoodon planifrons LC
- Longman's beaked whale, Indopacetus pacificus DD
- Andrews' beaked whale, Mesoplodon bowdoini DD
- Blainville's beaked whale, Mesoplodon densirostris DD
- Ginkgo-toothed beaked whale, Mesoplodon ginkgodens DD
- Gray's beaked whale, Mesoplodon grayi DD
- Hector's beaked whale, Mesoplodon hectori DD
- Strap-toothed whale, Mesoplodon layardii DD
- True's beaked whale, Mesoplodon mirus DD
- Shepherd's beaked whale, Tasmacetus shepherdi DD
- Cuvier's beaked whale, Ziphius cavirostris LC

== Sirenia ==
Dugongidae

- Dugong, Dugong dugon VU

== Carnivora ==
=== Pinnipedia ===
==== Otariidae ====
- Australian fur seal, Arctocephalus pusillus LC
- New Zealand fur seal, Arctocephalus forsteri LC
- Antarctic fur seal, Arctocephalus gazella LC
- Subantarctic fur seal, Arctocephalus tropicalis LC
- Australian sea lion, Neophoca cinerea EN

==== Phocidae ====
- Leopard seal, Hydrurga leptonyx LC
- Weddell seal, Leptonychotes weddellii LC
- Crabeater seal, Lobodon carcinophaga LC
- Southern elephant seal, Mirounga leonina LC
- Ross seal, Ommatophoca rossii LC

== See also ==
- List of mammals of Australia
  - List of monotremes and marsupials of Australia
  - List of bats of Australia
  - List of rodents of Australia
  - List of placental mammals introduced to Australia
