= Mallee =

Mallee may refer to:

- Mallee (habit), the habit of woody plants that grow with multiple stems from underground lignotubers

== Places ==
- Mallee (biogeographic region), a biogeographic region in southern Western Australia
- Mallee (Victoria), an informally defined region of north-western Victoria, Australia
  - Division of Mallee, an electoral district that includes this region
- Murray Mallee, an informally defined region of eastern South Australia

== Flora ==
- Mallee Woodlands and Shrublands, a vegetation group which occurs in semi-arid areas of southern Australia
- One of several eucalyptus species, including:
  - Bell-fruited mallee, Eucalyptus preissiana
  - Blackbutt mallee, Eucalyptus zopherophloia
  - Blue mallee (disambiguation), multiple species
  - Blue Mountains mallee, Eucalyptus stricta
  - Blue-leaved mallee, Eucalyptus polybractea
  - Book-leaf mallee, Eucalyptus kruseana
  - Cliff mallee ash, Eucalyptus cunninghamii - a tiny and rare mallee from a high rainfall region
  - Darke Peak mallee, Eucalyptus cretata
  - Deua gum, Eucalyptus wilcoxii
  - Faulconbridge mallee ash, Eucalyptus burgessiana - a mallee from a high rainfall region
  - Forrest's mallee, Eucalyptus forrestiana
  - Four-winged mallee, Eucalyptus tetraptera
  - Kybean mallee ash, Eucalyptus kybeanensis
  - Lemon-flowered mallee, Eucalyptus woodwardii
  - Mallee wattle, Acacia montana
  - Mangarlowe mallee, Eucalyptus recurva
  - Narrow-leaved mallee, Eucalyptus angustissima
  - Pear-fruited mallee, Eucalyptus pyriformis
  - Plunkett mallee, Eucalyptus curtisii
  - Red-flowered mallee box, Eucalyptus lansdowneana
  - Round-leaved mallee, Eucalyptus orbifolia
  - Sand mallee, Eucalyptus eremophila
  - Square-fruited mallee, Eucalyptus tetraptera
  - Thick-leaf mallee, Eucalyptus grossa
  - Wabling Hill mallee, Eucalyptus argutifolia
  - White mallee (disambiguation), multiple species
  - Yellow top mallee ash, Eucalyptus luehmanniana - a mallee from a high rainfall region

== Fauna ==
- Malleefowl, a bird that lives in mallee scrub
- Mallee dragon, a species of lizard that lives in mallee scrub

== People ==
- John Mallee, American baseball coach

== Other ==
- Mallee Highway, a highway that runs from Tailem Bend, South Australia to Piangil, Victoria
- Mali caste, a caste in India

== See also ==
- Malle, a municipality in the Belgian province of Antwerp
- Mali (disambiguation)
- Malli (disambiguation)
- Molly (disambiguation)
