= Inglewood, Victoria =

Inglewood
- Town
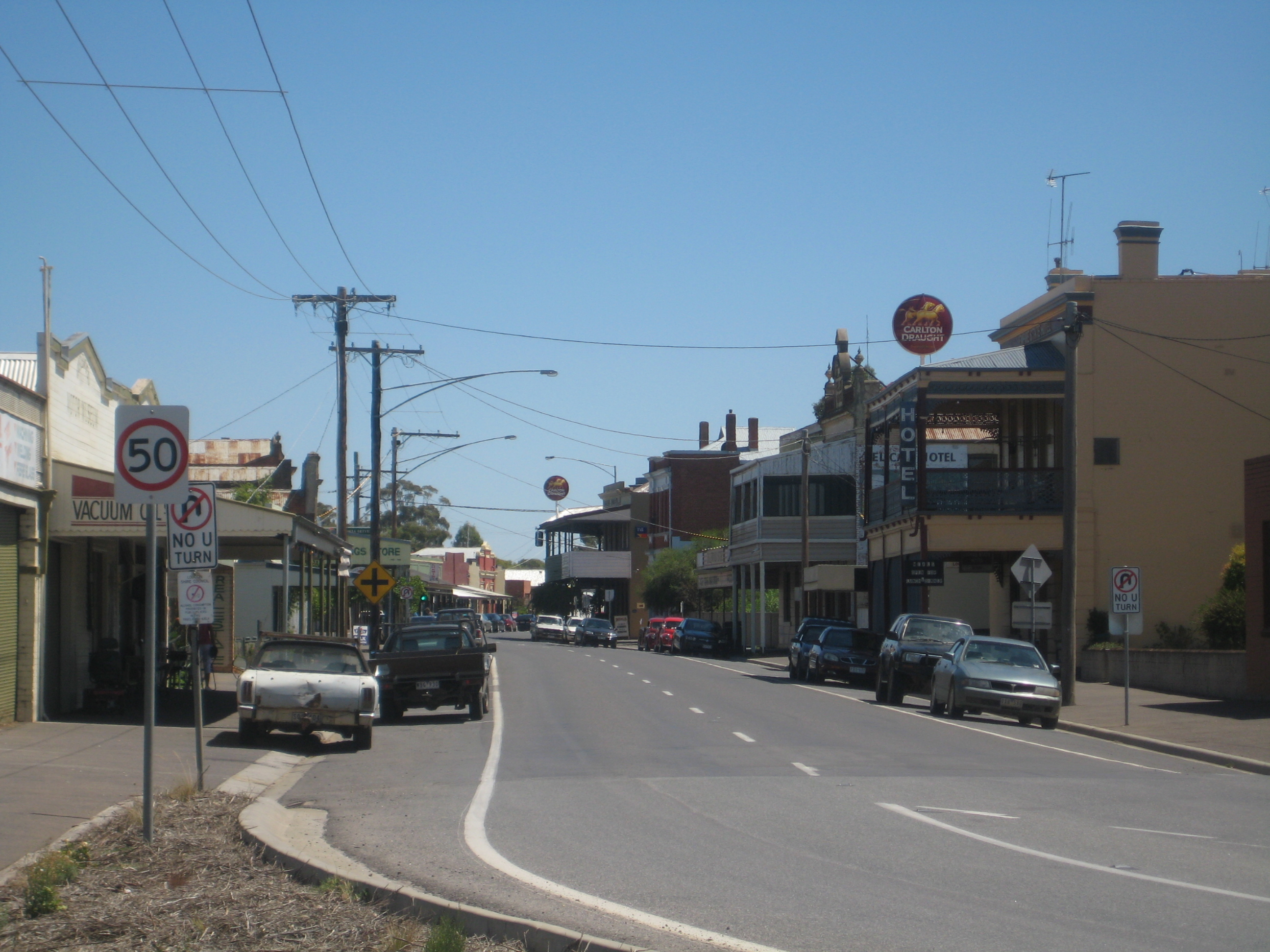
- Brooke Street, the town's main street February 2010

- Coordinates: 36°34′35″S 143°52′08″E
- Country: Australia
- State: Victoria
- LGA: Shire of Loddon
- Location: 185 km (115 mi) NW of Melbourne; 45 km (28 mi) NW of Bendigo; 30 km (19 mi) SE of Wedderburn
- Established: 1859

Government
  - State electorate: Ripon
  - Federal division: Mallee
- Elevation: 149 m (489 ft)

Population
  - Total: 886 (2021 census)
- Postcode: 3517

Inglewood is a town in Victoria, Australia, located on the Calder Highway in the Shire of Loddon.

== History ==
Inglewood, is known as the home of the 'Blue Mallee' Eucalyptus and is the home of Australia's largest Eucalyptus Oil Distillery, Bosisto's. The town was the largest producer of eucalyptus oil during the 1900s and is still home to two operating distilleries and the only Eucalyptus Distillery Museum in the country.

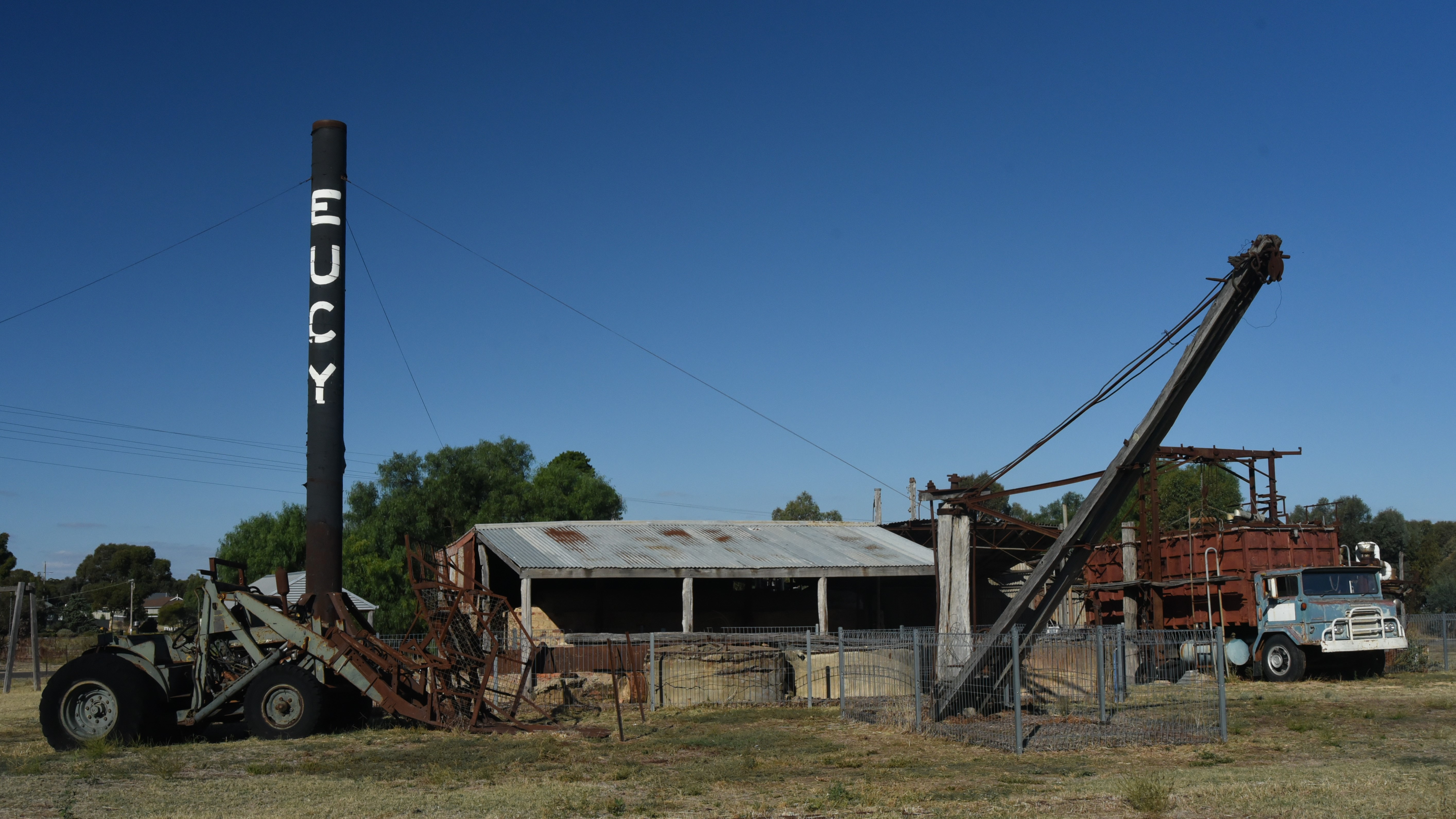
Heritage Listed Distillery and Museum Site

Inglewood was an important gold mining centre during the Victorian Gold Rush of the 1850s and 1860s.

Gold was first discovered in 1859 by Alexander, Joseph and Thomas Thompson and Joseph Hanny. On notification of the discovery some 16,000 diggers flocked to the area. By January 1860 a new field a few miles south of the original was opened up by Potter, Irvine and McKean and dubbed "New Inglewood". This is the site of the present township.

By mid-1860 the population on the field was estimated to be greater than 40,000, ranking among the biggest rushes in Victoria's history.

The population soon dwindled as the easily won alluvial deposits became exhausted but, as early as 1859, quartz reefs had been discovered which resulted in the permanent settlement of a few thousand miners and businessmen.

The initial returns from the quartz reefs were significant. From the Columbian, 22 tons of stone crushed gave a return of over 2300 ounces of gold, one of the richest patches of gold recorded in the colony of Victoria. Numerous other reefs, including the Maxwell's, Jersey, March and Morning Star, gained renown for their rich yields. In November 1860 there were 4,500 men employed in quartz mining, more than any other field at that time.

In 1861 the town was proclaimed a municipality and in 1863 the Borough of Inglewood was established. Self-government continued for 100 years until the borough was annexed to the Shire of Korong.

In December 1862 one of the most destructive fires recorded in the colony to that time occurred in the town's main thoroughfare. A greater portion of the commercial precinct was burned to the ground, with damages estimated at over £100,000. The ultimate result of the fire was a transition from bark and canvass establishments to more substantial brick and iron structures, many of which remain today.

Toward the end of the 19th century, gold production began to diminish, and a new form of employment was sought. The eucalyptus oil industry took hold when it was discovered that the leaves of the Blue Mallee, which is endemic to Inglewood and surrounds, produced the highest quality eucalyptus oil available. The most notable distilleries at the time were: The Valvoline Oil Company (of the United States), Bosisto's (still operating), The Taig's Distillery (still operating) and The Old Jones' Distillery which is now home to the Eucalyptus Distillery Museum and has attained an important heritage listing. The Inglewood district still produces the greater portion of Victoria's eucalyptus oil.

Post offices opened at Inglewood on 12 March 1860 and at New Inglewood soon after on 15 May 1860. The Inglewood post office was renamed Old Inglewood around 1865 and closed in 1882. The New Inglewood post office was then renamed Inglewood around 1870.

From 6 December 1861 until 1 February 1961, Inglewood was managed by a borough council.

At the 2021 census Inglewood had a population of 886.

== Present ==
Inglewood is known as the "Blue Eucalyptus" town and is the largest town in the Loddon Shire, with 886 residents according to the 2021 census. It is the main service town for the Loddon Shire with a hospital, chemist, community bank, supermarket and hardware store providing services to its residents in Inglewood and the surrounding towns.

Inglewood's main tourist attraction is the Eucalyptus Distillery Museum which is located on the Calder Hwy on the site of the "Old Jones' Distillery". The site is heritage listed and houses a museum, retail store, coffee bar and model distillery. The eucalyptus oil industry is still a major employer in the region with two commercial distilleries located close by. There are many hectares of Eucalyptus polybractea plantations that the local distilleries use to harvest eucalyptus oil.

Inglewood is a notable example of a Victorian gold rush town, with its 19th-century architecture attracting many visitors. The main street, Brooke Street, is noted for its narrowness and concentration of double-story buildings. No less than seven hotel buildings (two still operating) and four bank buildings are found in Brooke Street. Several buildings were designed by prominent Bendigo architects Vahland and Getzmann, including the Charlie Napier Hotel. Inglewood is also notable for the collection of public and religious buildings located away from the main thoroughfare, unusual for a town of its size. The town hall features a tower and chiming clock.

The town is also gaining a reputation amongst treasure hunters, with at least half a dozen vintage and antique stores operating in Brooke Street.

Gold-seekers still converge on the surrounding bushland in search of gold. Since the million dollar "Hand of Faith" nugget was discovered 11 km west at Kingower in 1980, gold detectors have brought fresh discoveries left behind by the early prospectors. Inglewood forms part of the "Golden Triangle" which encompasses some of the richest alluvial goldfields in the world, including Kingower, Rheola, Dunolly, Tarnagulla and Moliagul, where the biggest gold nugget ever unearthed, the "Welcome Stranger", was discovered.

Quartz mining is also still present, with MG Gold operating the Maxwell's Mine to the north of the township.

Inglewood is the gateway to Kooyoora State Park. Located a short distance west of the town, the park is a popular camping and recreation location and home to Melville's Caves where the bushranger Captain Melville is rumoured to have based himself during the 1850s. Melville caves is a stunning location with a view of the entire region from the lookout.

The town is central to the Bridgewater On Loddon and Kingower wineries, producing quality red and white wines.

The town has an Australian Rules football team, the "Blues", competing in the Loddon Valley Football League. The Inglewood Football Club was formed around 1873 and was a foundation member of the Victorian Football Association (VFA) in 1877.

Golfers play at the course of the Inglewood Golf Club on the Calder Highway.

== Notable people ==
- Sir Reginald Ansett, businessman and founder of Ansett Airlines, was born in Inglewood in 1909.
- The runner Jack Donaldson who held every professional sprint world record in the early part of the 1900s resided in Inglewood.
- E. G. Carji Greeves, first winner of the Brownlow Medal, was Inglewood Football Club's coach in 1935
- Frances Emma (Fanny) Hines was a Boer War nurse and the first Australian woman to die on active service.
- Sir Julius Vogel was editor of the Inglewood Advertiser newspaper in 1860 and later became Prime Minister of New Zealand.
- John Day (known as Johnny Day) (1856–1885), world-champion juvenile walker and later rider of Nimblefoot the winning horse in the 1870 Melbourne Cup, died aged 27 on 10 June 1885 at Inglewood Hospital. He is buried at the Inglewood cemetery.
- Sir Neil Hamilton Fairley, medical scientist and army officer, who was instrumental in saving thousands of Allied lives from malaria and other diseases, was born in Inglewood in 1891.
- Thomas Tatchell (1867–1936), first class Victorian cricketer, was born in Inglewood.
- Cr George Gahan JP born in Inglewood in 1912 and later became the Mayor of City of Prahran in 1965 and 1970. He was also the Australian Labor Party candidate for the state seat of Prahran in 1961.
- Maurice McCrae Blackburn(1880–1944), lawyer and politician, was born in Inglewood in 1883.
- Major General Edwin Tivey (1866–1947), soldier and stockbroker, born in Inglewood in 1866.

== Gallery ==
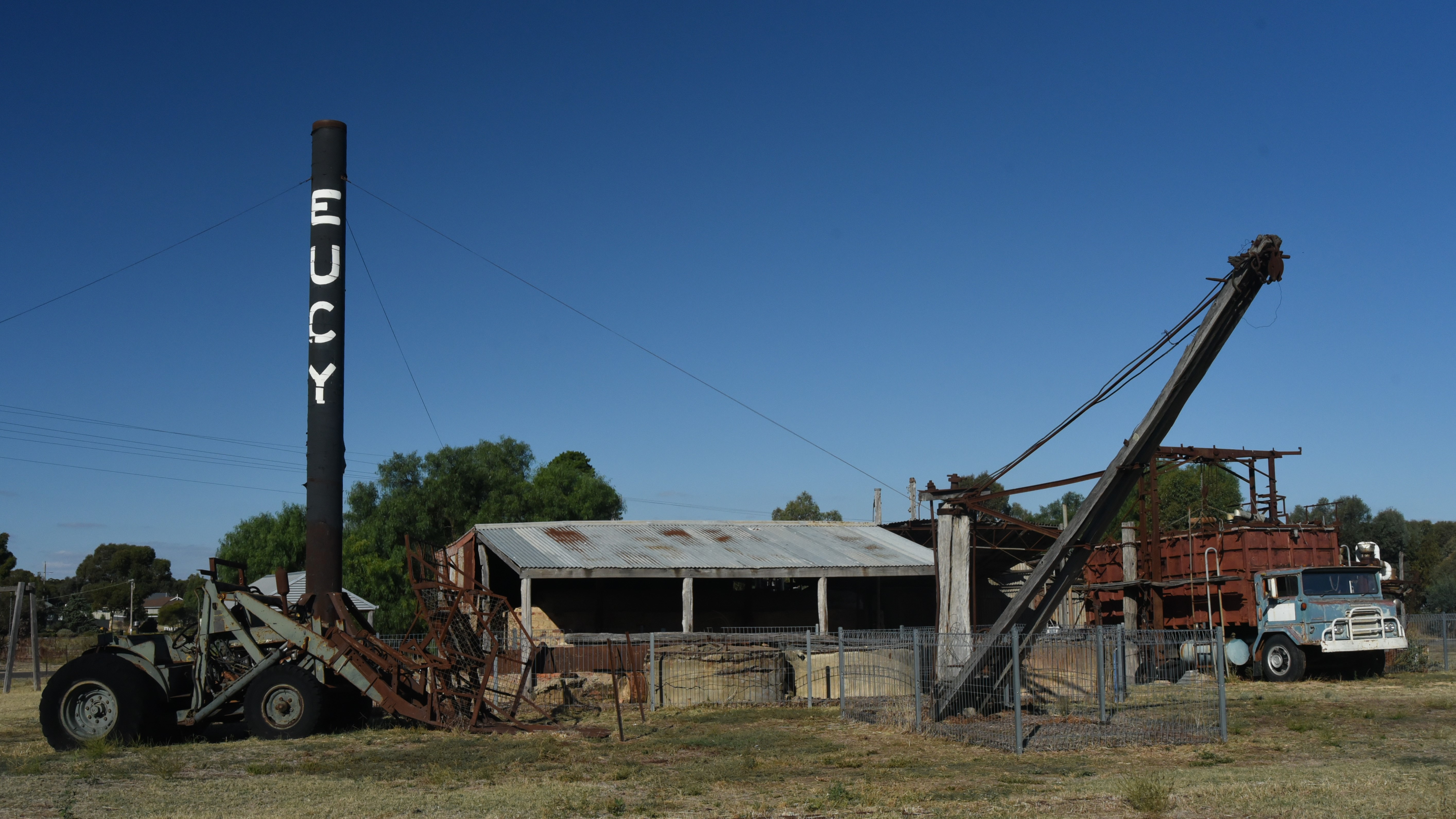
Heritage Listed Old Jones' Distillery - Eucy Museum Inglewood

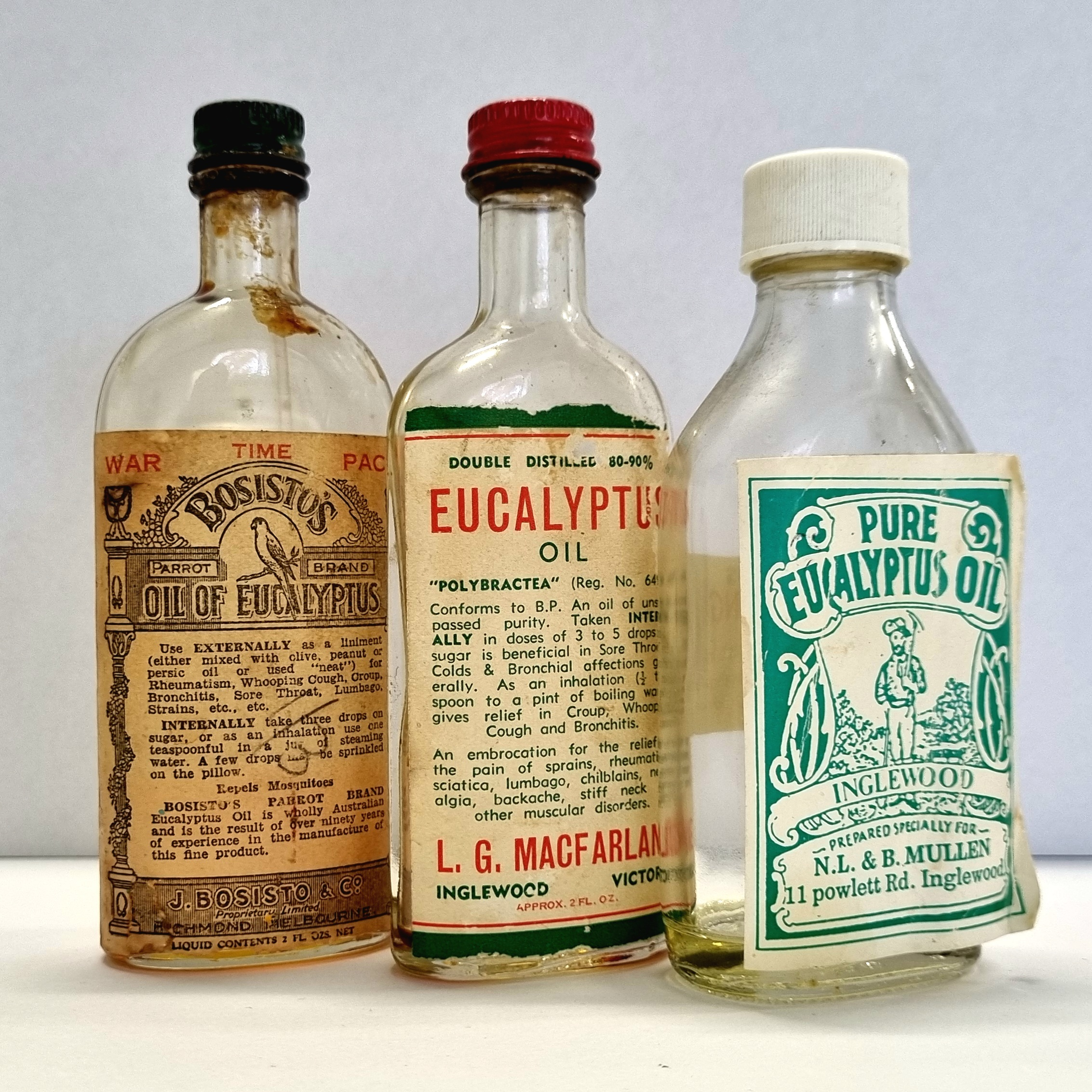
Old Eucalyptus Oil Bottles housed at the Eucy Museum in Inglewood

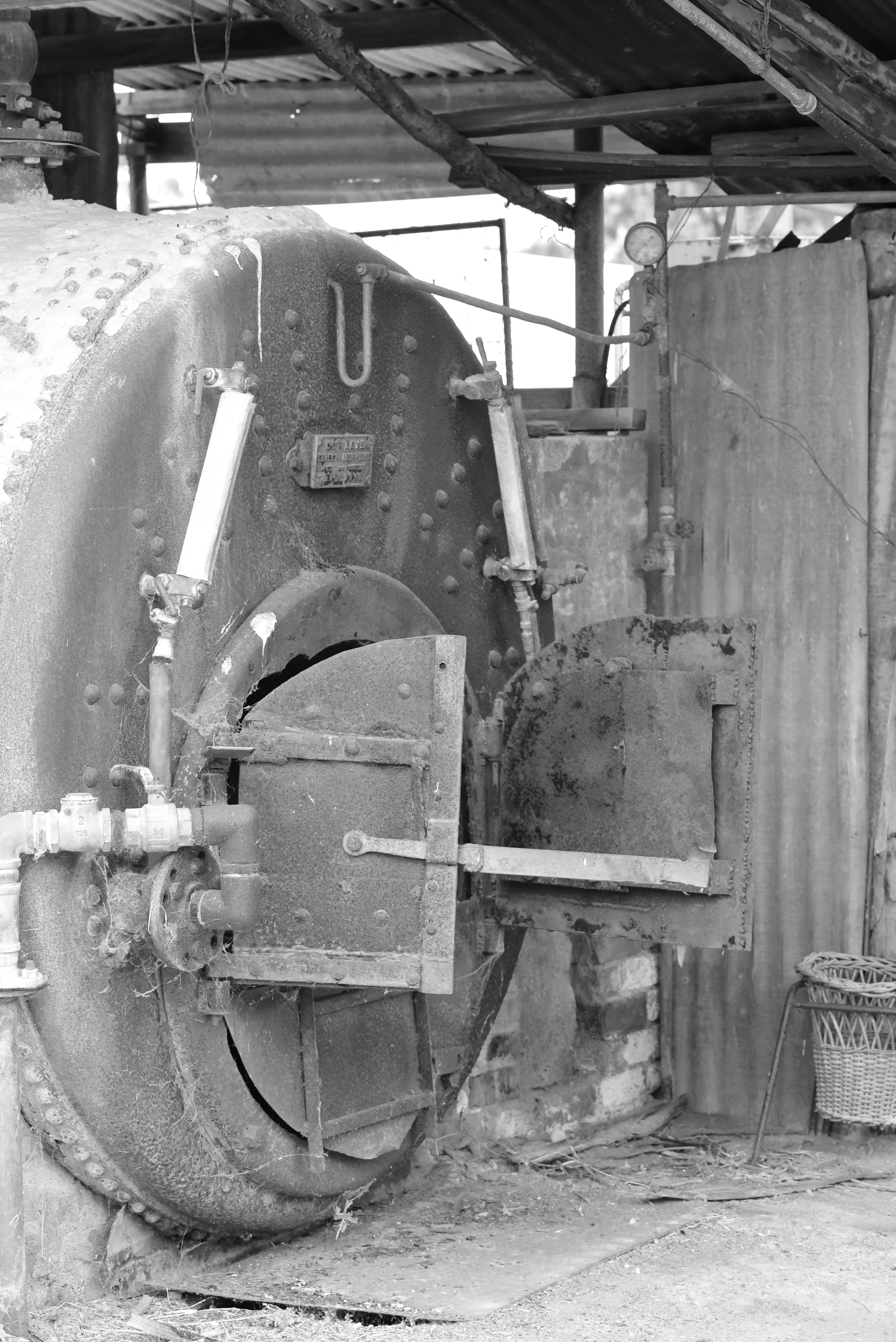
Cowley's of Ballarat Boiler at the Eucy Museum in Inglewood

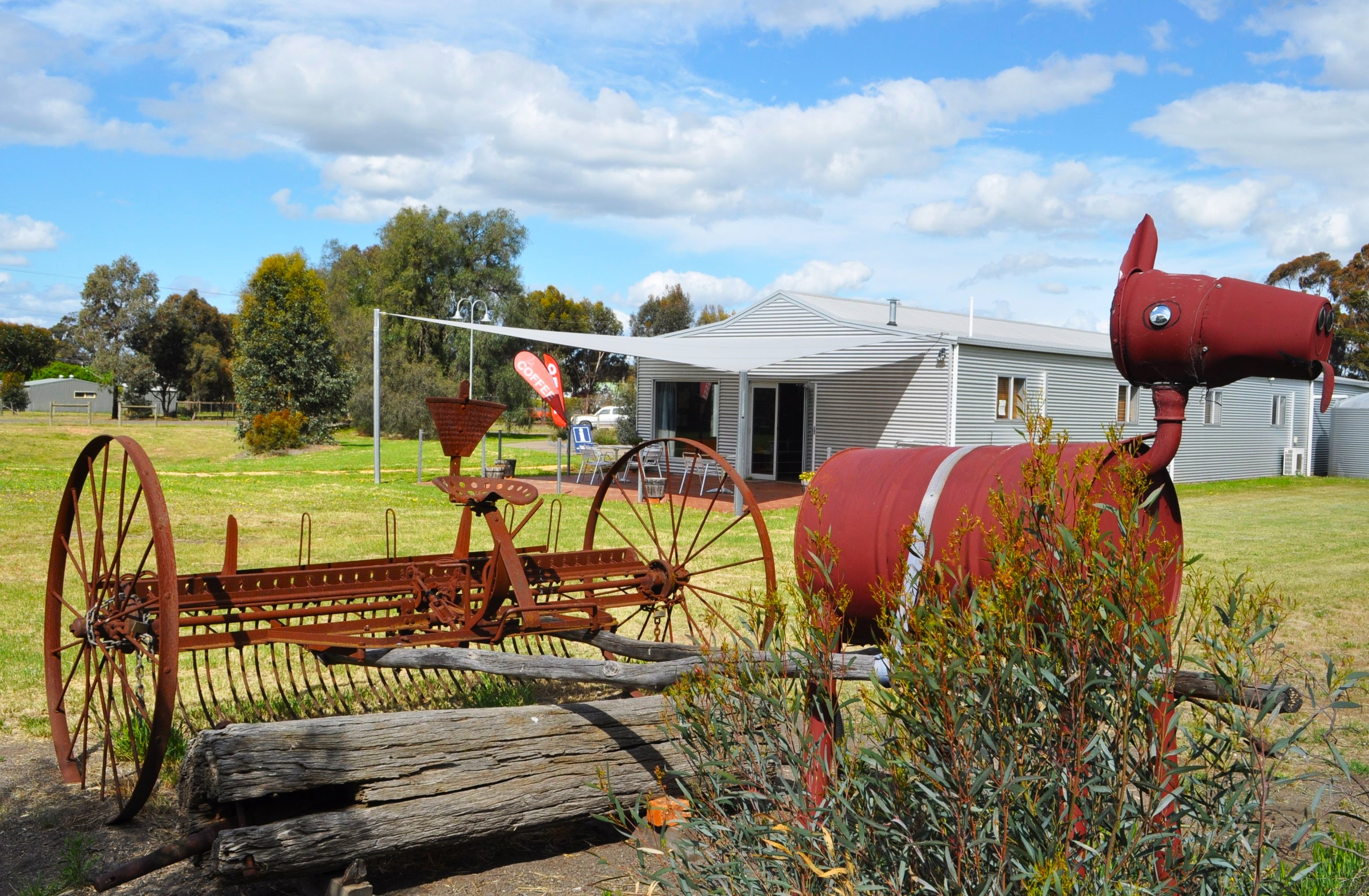
Eucalyptus Distillery Museum

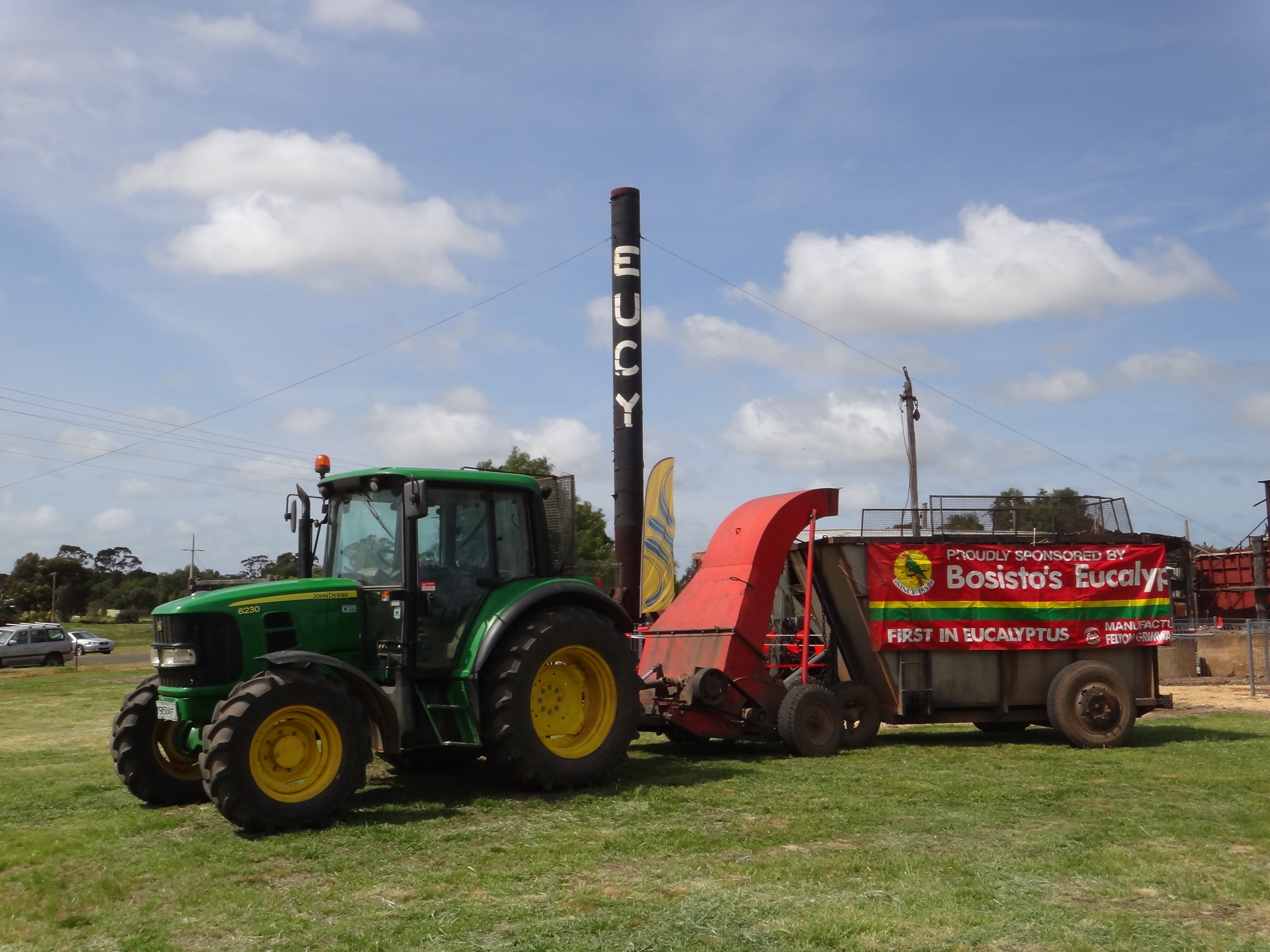
Eucy Museum Inglewood

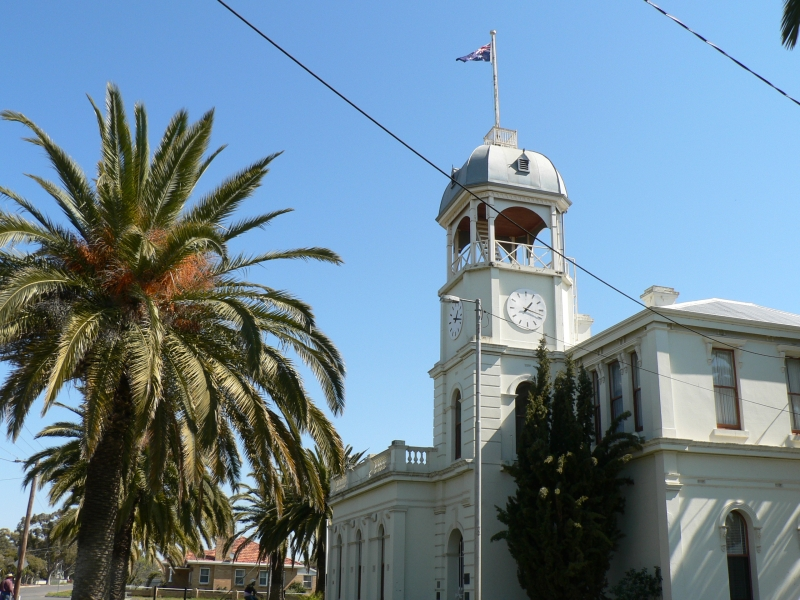
Inglewood Town Hall

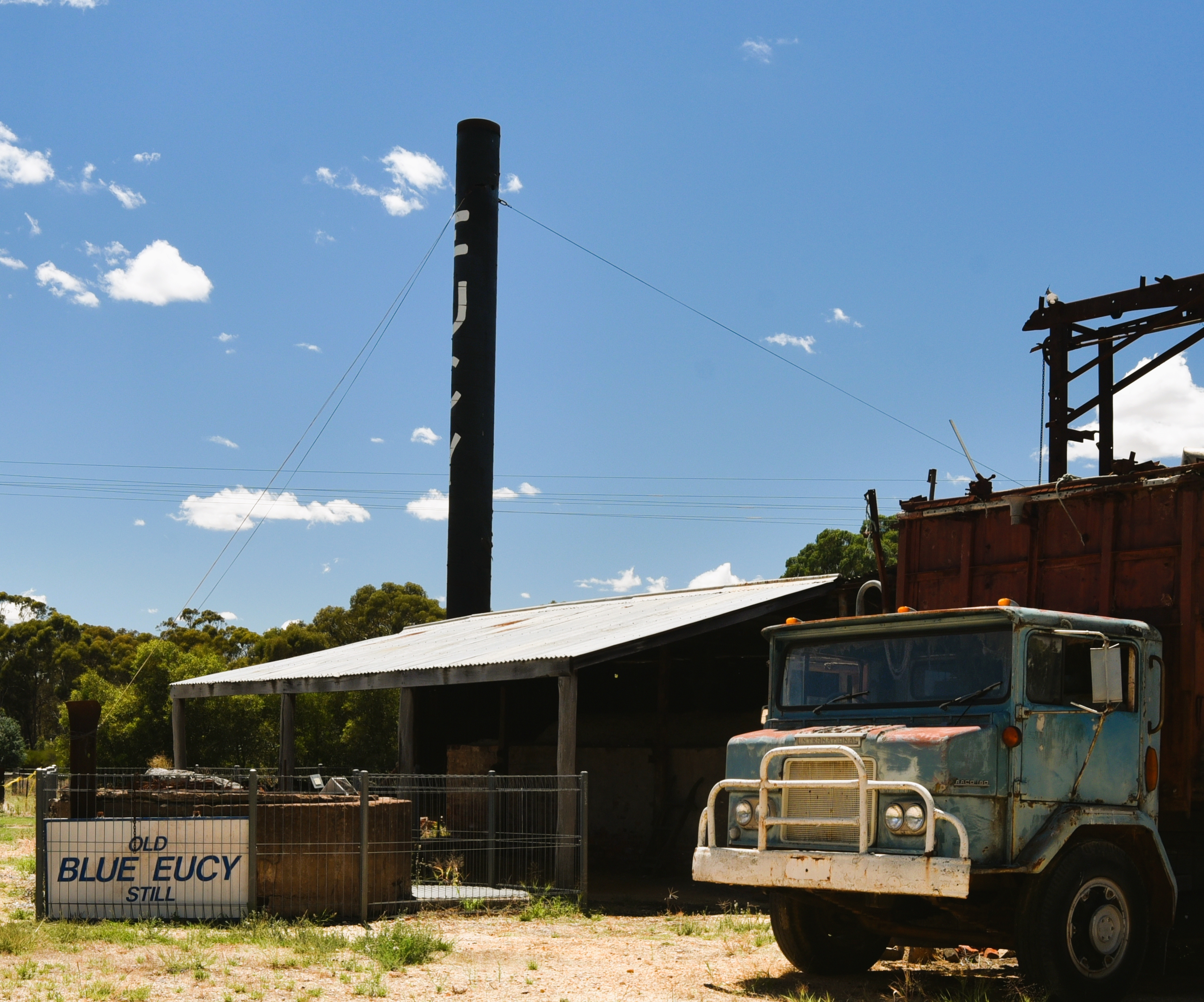
Old Jones Distillery - Eucalyptus Distillery Museum

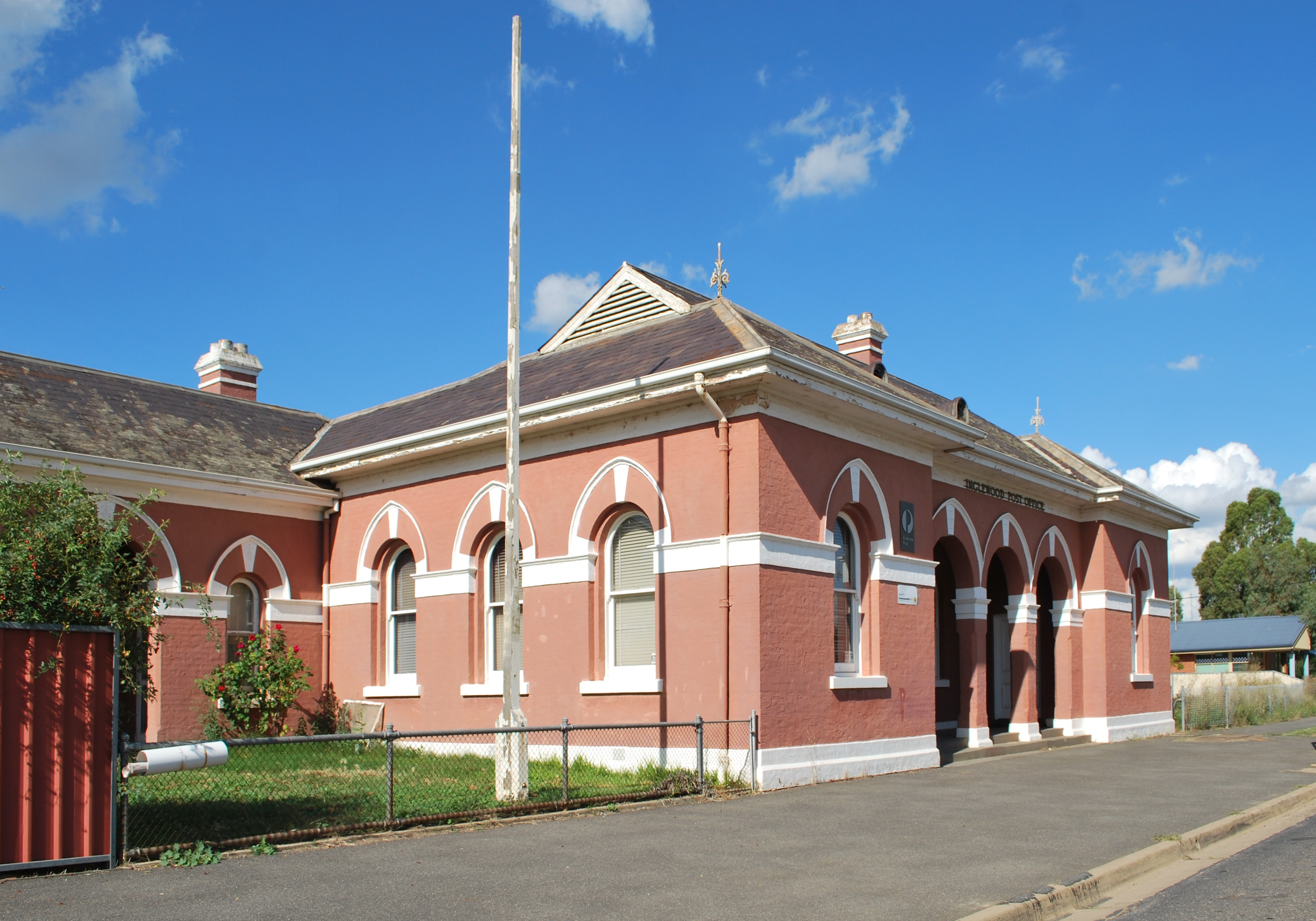
Post Office

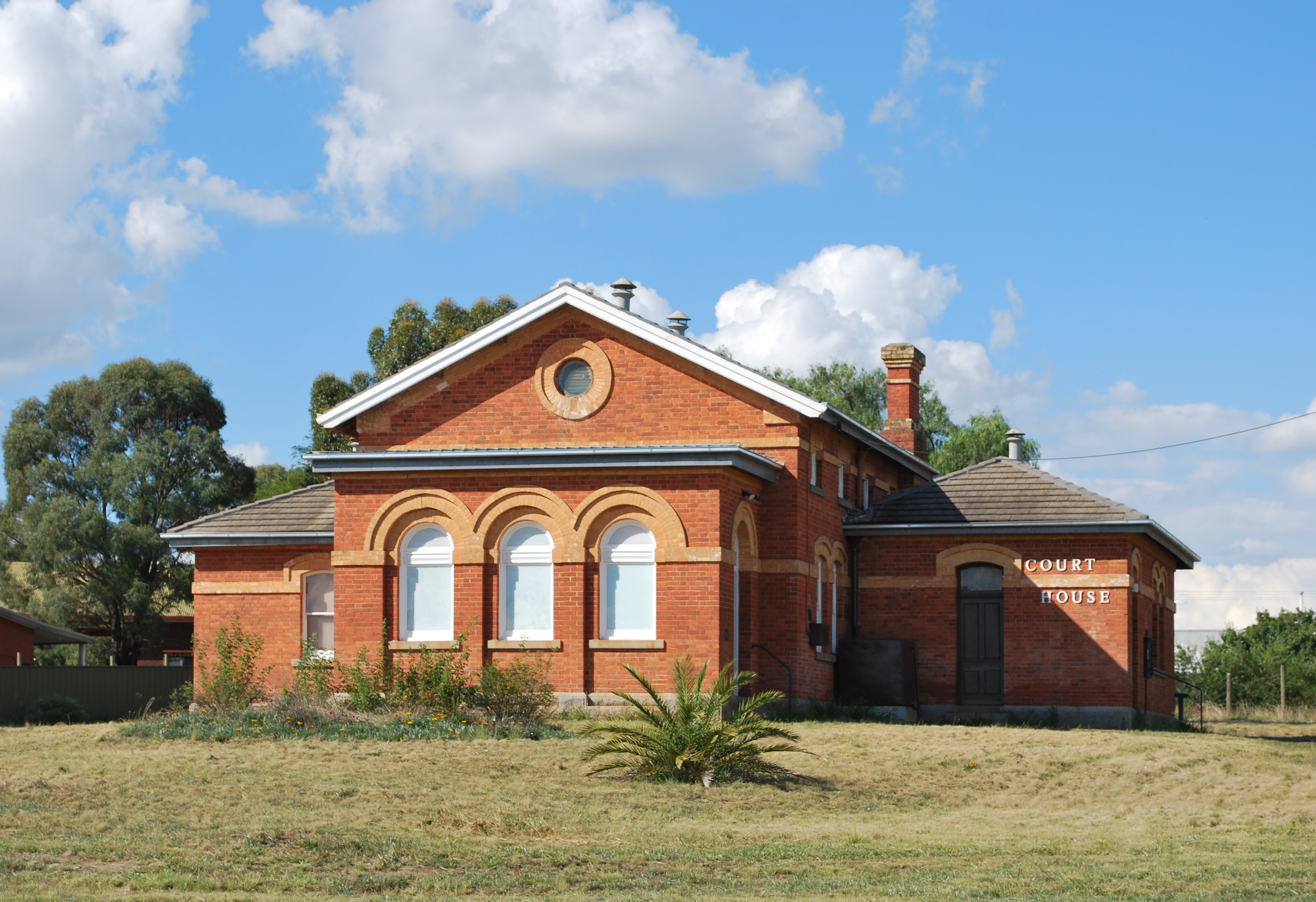
Court House

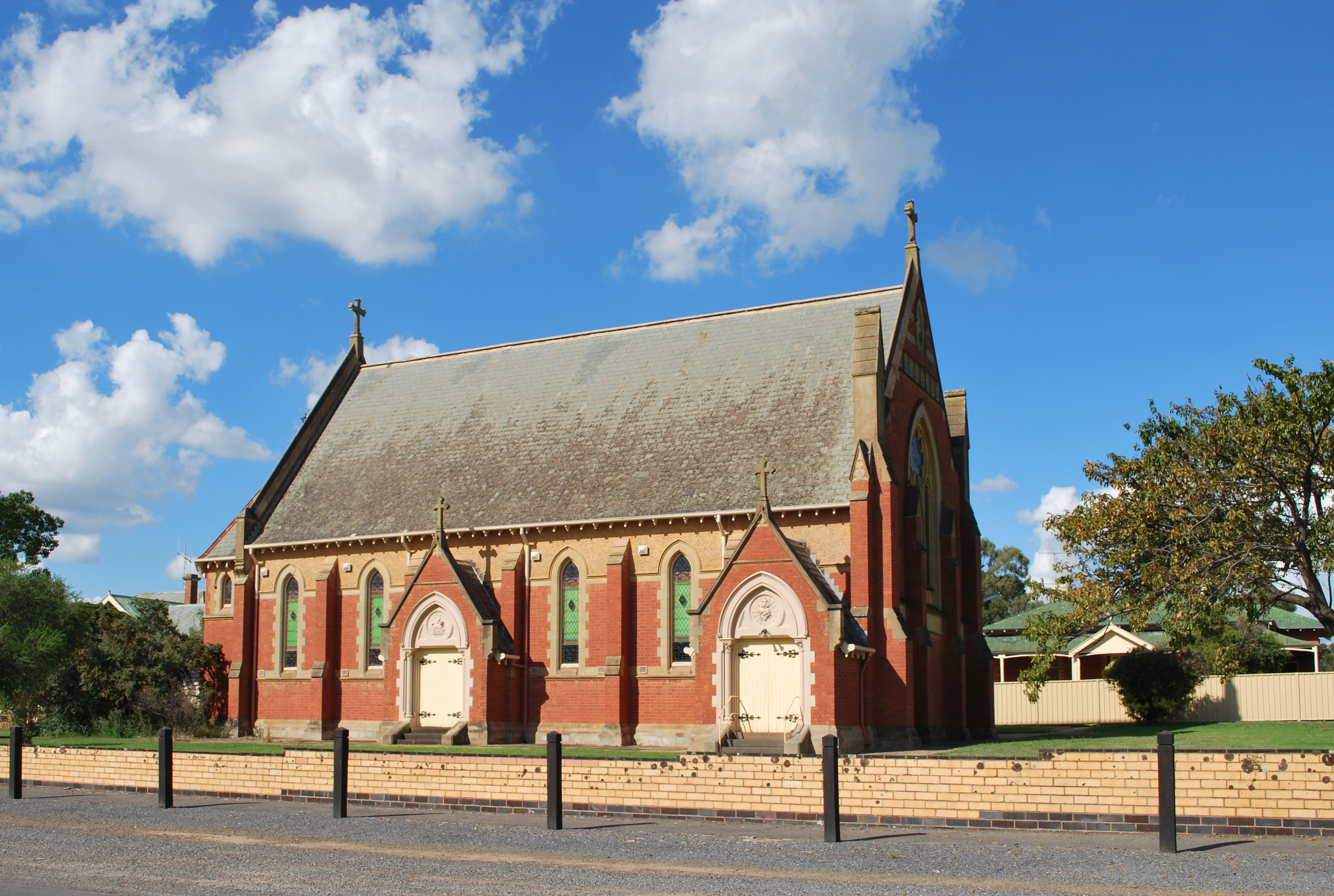
Catholic Church

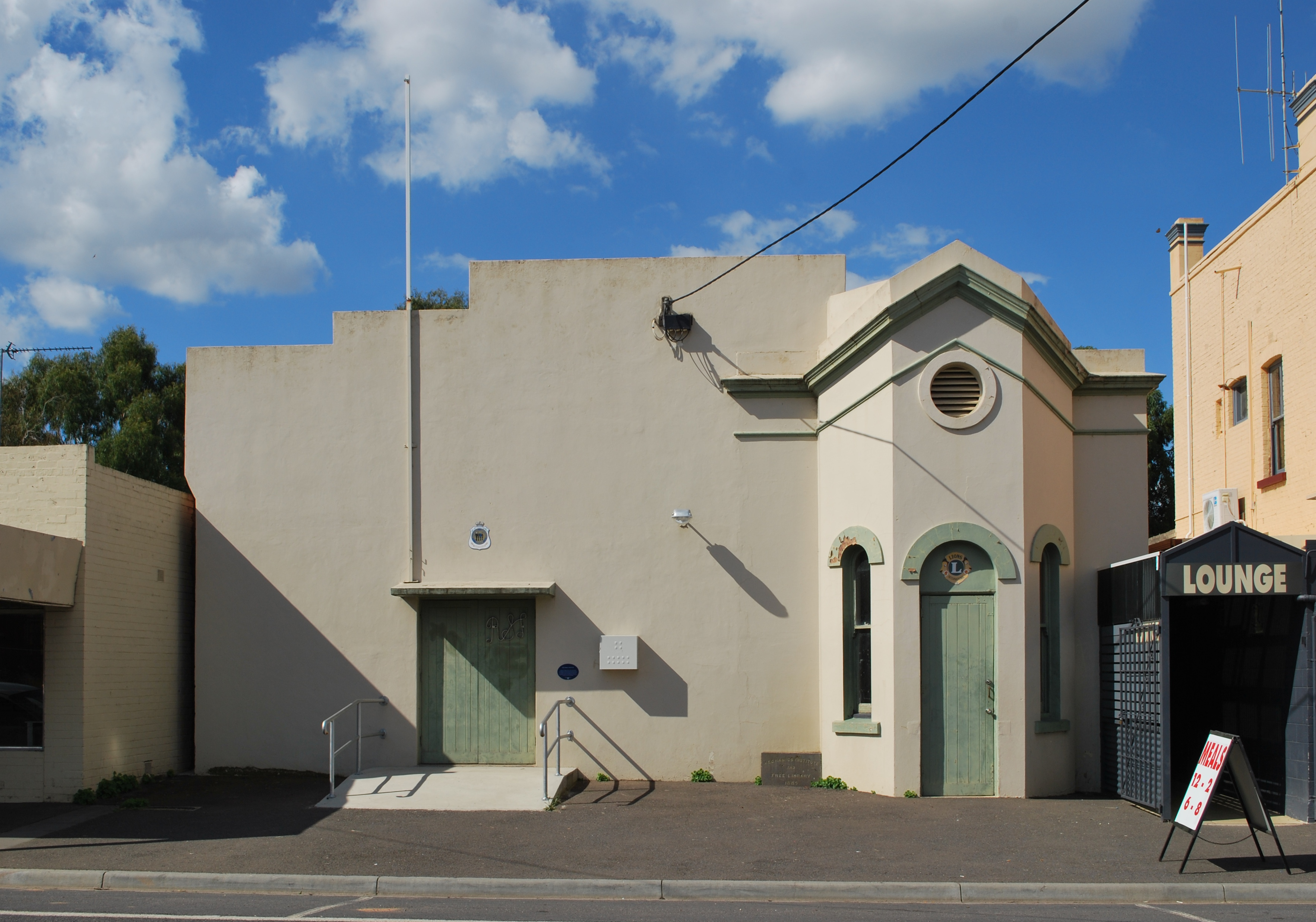
Mechanics Institute

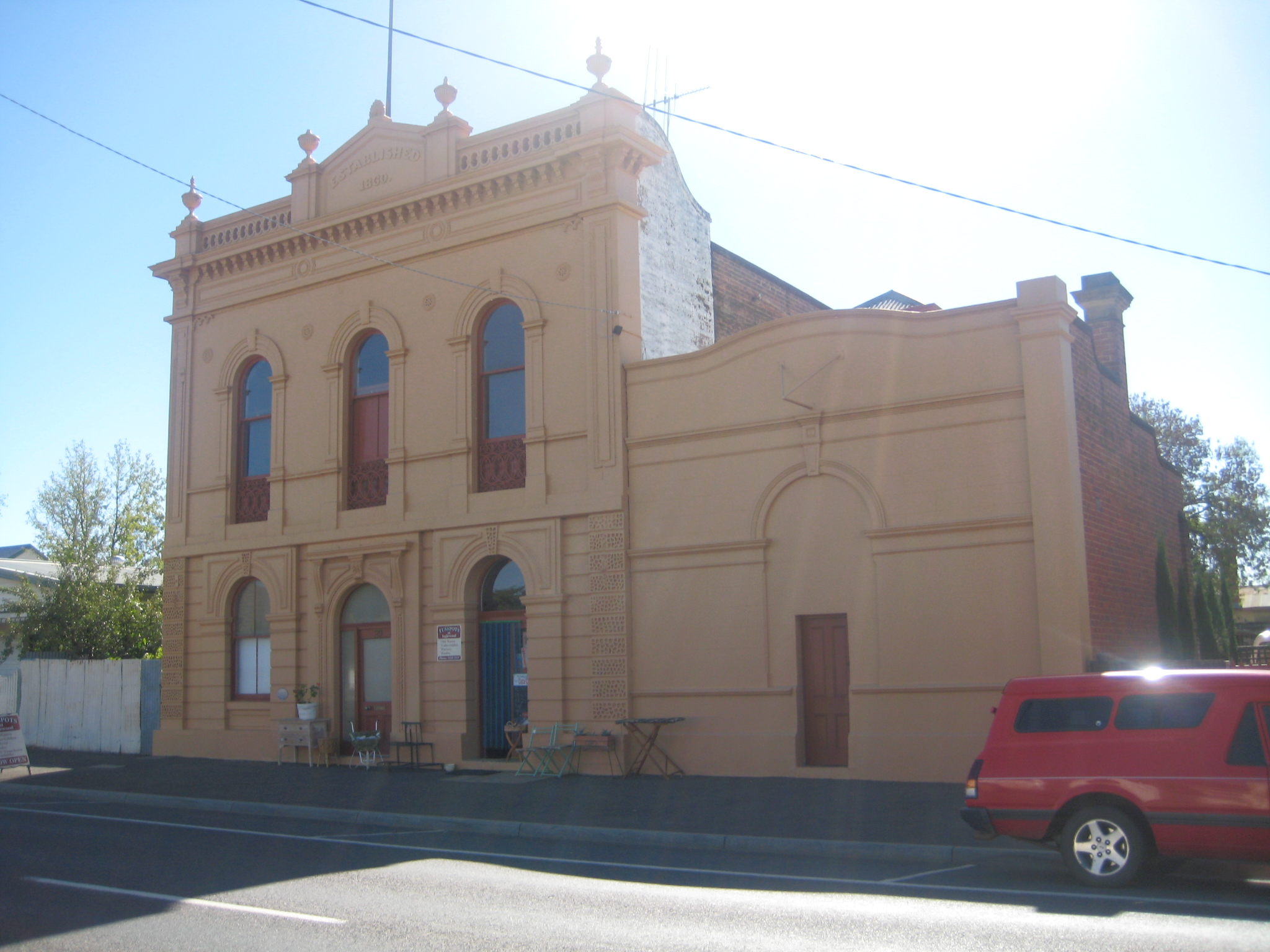
Charlie Napier Hotel

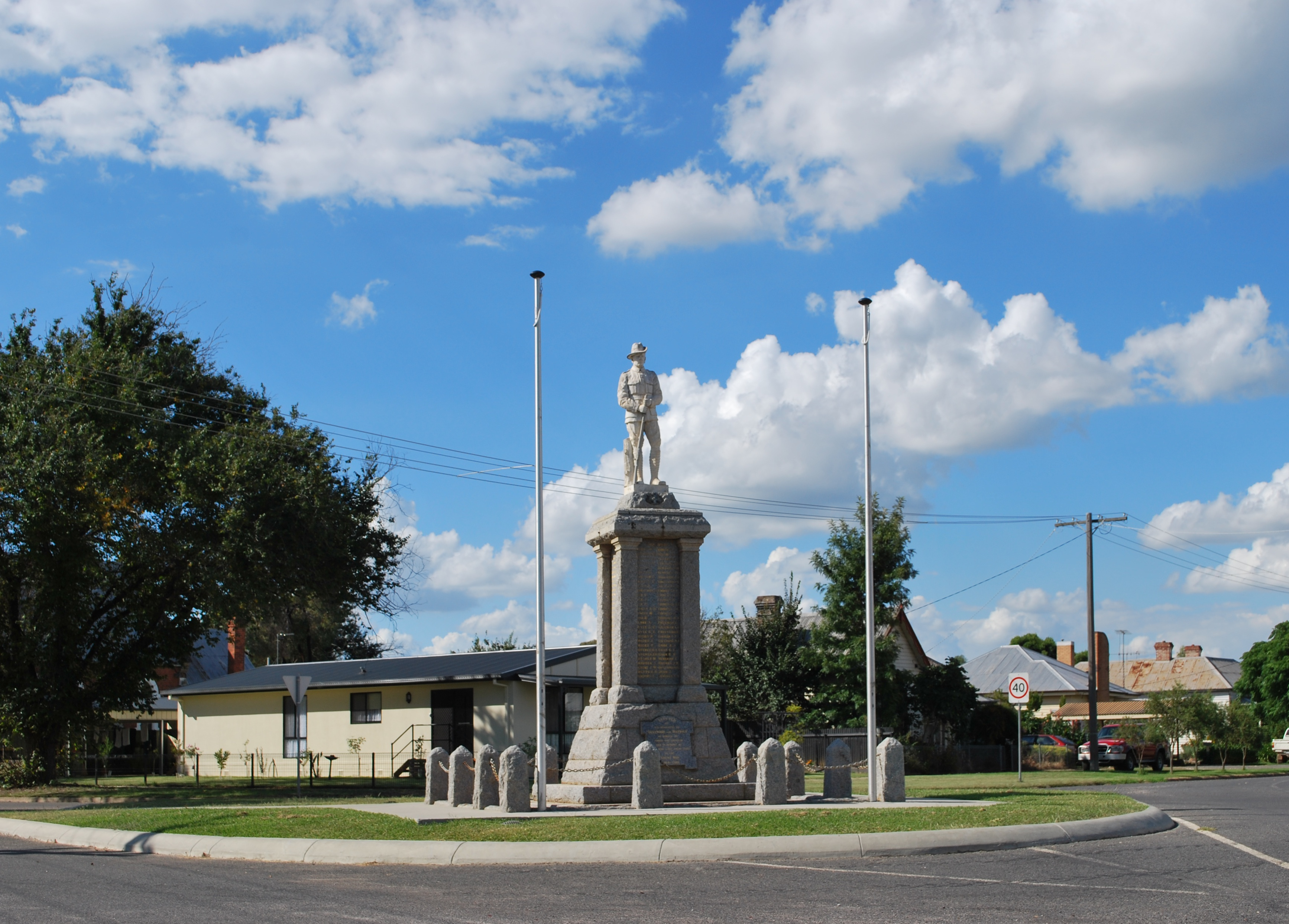
War Memorial
