= Tatchell =

Tatchell is a surname. Notable people with the surname include:

- Peter Tatchell (born 1952), gay rights activist in the UK
- Spence Tatchell (1924–2007), Canadian ice hockey player
- Terri Tatchell (born 1978), Canadian screenwriter
- Thomas Tatchell (1867–1936), Australian cricketer

== See also ==
- Hatchell
