= White mallee =

White mallee is a common name for several plants and may refer to:

- Eucalyptus cylindriflora, native to Western Australia
- Eucalyptus dumosa, native to South Australia, New South Wales, and Victoria
- Eucalyptus erythronema, native to Western Australia
