= Mali (disambiguation) =

Mali is a country in Western Africa.

Mali may also refer to:

== Places ==
- Mali Empire, a Mandinka nation that existed from c. 1247 to c. 1600
- Mali Federation, a former country in Western Africa
- Mali, Guinea, a town in Guinea
- Mali Prefecture, a prefecture in Guinea
- Mali, Ardabil, a town in Iran
- Mali River, a river in Myanmar
- Mali Kyun (Tavoy Island), a sea island in Myanmar
- Mali, Nepal
- Alor Island Airport, an airport in Indonesia, also known as Mali Airport
- Lima Art Museum (Museo de Arte de Lima), an art museum in Peru
- Mali station, a station on Line 14 of the Guangzhou Metro

== People ==
- Albina Mali (1925–2001), Slovenian Yugoslav Partisans member
- Anais Mali (born 1991), French model
- Mali (cartoonist), Indian cartoonist
- Mali (singer) (born 1993), Indian singer
- Mali Wu (born 1957), Taiwanese installation artist
- T. R. Mahalingam (flautist) or Mali (1926–1986), Indian flautist

== Other uses ==
- Mali (album), a 2004 album by Brenda Fassie
- Mali (dog), a military working dog awarded the 2017 Dickin Medal for bravery
- Mali (elephant) (1970s – 2023), a female Asian elephant who lived in the Philippines
- Mali (film), a 2018 Croatian film
- Mali (GPU), graphics hardware and software manufactured by ARM Holdings
- Mali (TV series), a 2011–2015 Kenyan soap opera
- Mali caste, a caste of gardeners and vegetable growers in Nepal and India
- Mali language, a Papuan language of Papua New Guinea
- Litsea garciae, a tree native to Southeast Asia locally called Mali
- Mali, a colloquial term for a Somali person

== See also ==
- Ma Li (disambiguation)
- Mallee (disambiguation)
- Malli (disambiguation)
- Molly (disambiguation)
- Montenegro or Mali i Zi in Albanian
