= Hatchell =

Hatchell is a surname. Notable people with the surname include:

- John Hatchell (1788–1870), Irish lawyer and politician
- Steven J. Hatchell, American sports administrator
- Sylvia Hatchell (born 1952), American women's basketball coach
- Thomas Hatchell, Irish Anglican cleric
