= Malhi =

Malhi may refer to:

- Malhi (Jat clan), a Jat clan of India and Pakistan

People

- Ali Asjad Malhi, Pakistani politician
- Farhan Ahmed Malhi, Pakistani actor
- Gobind Malhi, Indian writer of Sindhi literature
- Gurbax Singh Malhi, Indian-born Canadian politician
- Harinder Malhi, Indian-Canadian politician
- Lal Chand Malhi, Pakistani politician
- Manju Malhi, British-Indian chef
- Naseer Ahmad Malhi, Pakistani politician
- Nir Malhi, Israeli martial arts teacher
- Yadvinder Malhi, British academic

== See also ==
- Malli (disambiguation)
