= Malli =

Malli may refer to:

- Mallinatha, 19th Jain Tirthankara
- Mallian people, an ancient tribe defeated by Alexander in the Mallian Campaign
- Malli (film), a 1998 Indian Tamil-language film
- Malli (2013 TV series), a 2013–2014 Indian Tamil-language soap opera
- Malli, a fictional character in the 2022 Indian film RRR
- Malli (2024 TV series), an Indian Tamil-language television series
- Melli, a town in Sikkim, India
- Mallı, a village in Azerbaijan
- Malli Mastan Babu (1974–2015), Indian mountaineer
- Choi Malli, a 15th-century Korean scholar
- Yunus Mallı (born 1992), Turkish footballer

== See also ==
- Mali (disambiguation)
- Mallee (disambiguation)
- Malhi (disambiguation)
