= Ma Li =

Ma Li may refer to:

- Ma Li (politician) (1916–1979), Chinese politician
- Ma Li (footballer) (born 1969), Chinese female footballer
- Ma Li (actress) (born 1982), Chinese actress
- Ma Lik (1952–2007), or Ma Li, Hong Kong politician

== See also ==
- Mali (disambiguation)
