= Inglewood Advertiser =

Former newspaper of Victoria, Australia

The Inglewood Advertiser was a newspaper published in Inglewood, Victoria, Australia.

== Digitisation ==
The newspaper has been digitised by Trove for the editions between 6 January 1914 to 31 December 1918.
