= Thomas Hatchell =

Irish Anglican cleric

Thomas Henry Hatchell was Archdeacon of Leighlin from 1899 until 1922.

Hatchell was educated at Trinity College, Dublin. was ordained in 1854. He served curacies in Killabban; Hacketstown; Clonegal; Thomastown and Staplestown where he became the Incumbent in 1871. He was Treasurer of Leighlin Cathedral from 1888 to 1899.
