= Blue mallee =

Blue mallee is a common name for two species of plants:

- Eucalyptus gamophylla in South Australia, Western Australia, Northern Territory
- Eucalyptus polybractea in New South Wales and Victoria
