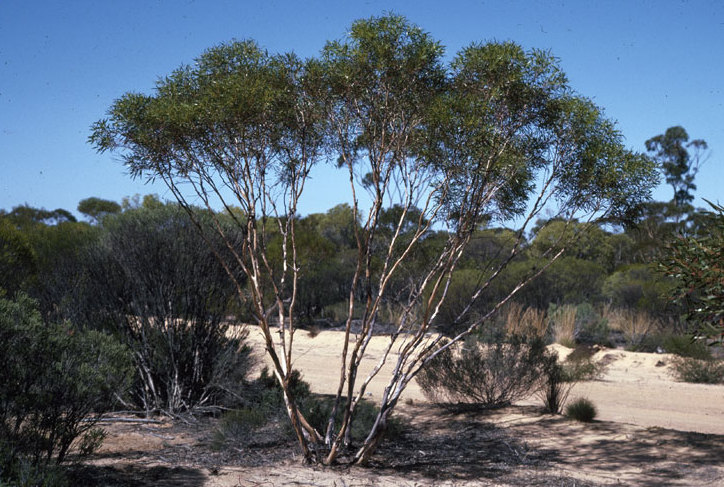
- Eucalyptus cylindriflora near Hyden

Scientific classification
- Kingdom: Plantae
- Clade: Embryophytes
- Clade: Tracheophytes
- Clade: Spermatophytes
- Clade: Angiosperms
- Clade: Eudicots
- Clade: Rosids
- Order: Myrtales
- Family: Myrtaceae
- Genus: Eucalyptus
- Species: E. cylindriflora

Binomial name
- Eucalyptus cylindriflora Maiden & Blakely

= Eucalyptus cylindriflora =

White mallee

Species of eucalyptus

Eucalyptus cylindriflora, commonly known as the white mallee or goldfields white mallee, is a species of mallee that is endemic to the southwest of Western Australia. It has smooth bark, glossy green, linear adult leaves, flower buds in groups of seven, creamy white flowers and cylindrical to cup-shaped fruit.

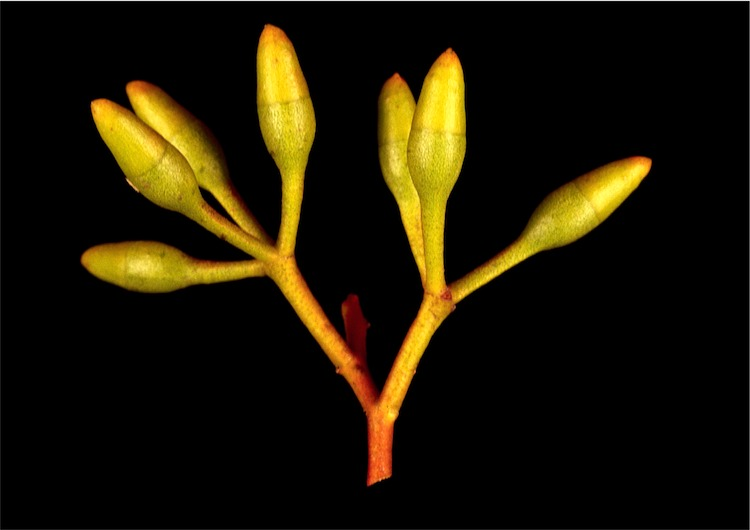
Flower buds

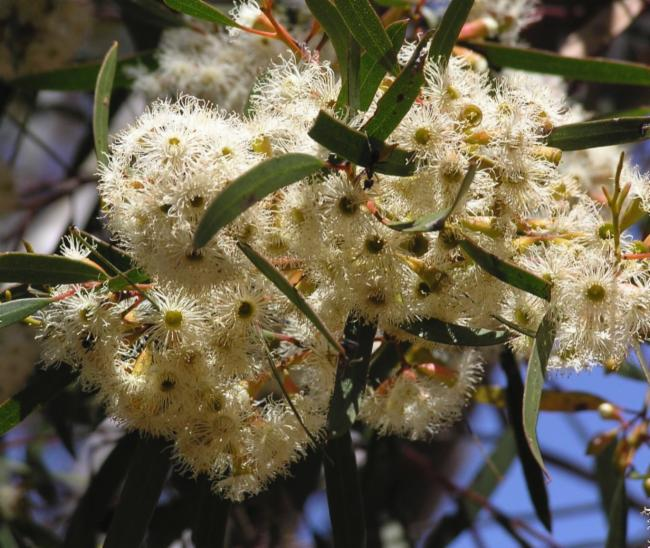
Flowers

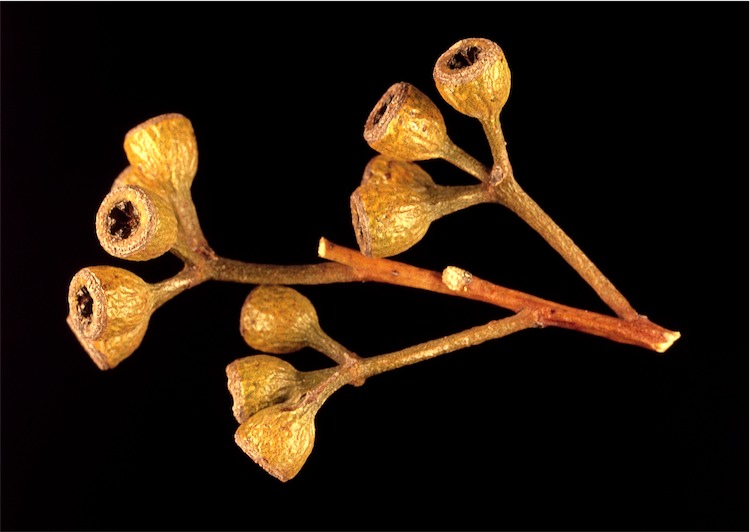
Fruit

== Description ==
Eucalyptus cylindriflora is a mallee that typically grows to a height of 1.5–6 m (4 ft 11 in – 19 ft 8 in) and forms a lignotuber. It has smooth white to greyish bark. Young plants and coppice regrowth have linear to lance-shaped leaves that are glossy green on the upper surface, dull below, 40–80 mm (1.6–3.1 in) long and 5–15 mm (0.20–0.59 in) wide. The adult leaves are linear, the same glossy green on both sides, 40–75 mm (1.6–3.0 in) long and 4–10 mm (0.16–0.39 in) wide on a petiole 3–13 mm (0.12–0.51 in) long. The flower buds are arranged in groups of seven on a thin peduncle 9–27 mm (0.35–1.06 in) long, the individual buds on a pedicel 4–10 mm (0.16–0.39 in) long. Mature buds are oval to cylindrical, 10–13 mm (0.39–0.51 in) long and 4–7 mm (0.16–0.28 in) wide with a conical operculum. Flowering occurs from December to March and the flowers are creamy white. The fruit is a woody cylindrical to cup-shaped capsule 6–10 mm (0.24–0.39 in) long and 6–9 mm (0.24–0.35 in) wide.

== Taxonomy and naming ==
Eucalyptus cylindriflora was first formally described in 1925 by Joseph Maiden and William Blakely from a specimen collected by Charles Gardner near Bendering, growing with Melaleuca uncinata. The description was published in Journal and Proceedings of the Royal Society of New South Wales. The specific epithet (cylindriflora) is derived from Latin and refers to the cylinder-shaped flower buds of this species.

== Distribution and habitat ==
White mallee is found on sandplains on the south western Goldfields-Esperance, Wheatbelt and Great Southern regions of Western Australia growing in mallee shrubland in sandy or clay sand soils with lateritic gravel.

== Conservation status ==
This mallee is classified as "not threatened" by the Western Australian Government Department of Parks and Wildlife.

== See also ==
- List of Eucalyptus species
