= Fanny Hines =

Australian nurse

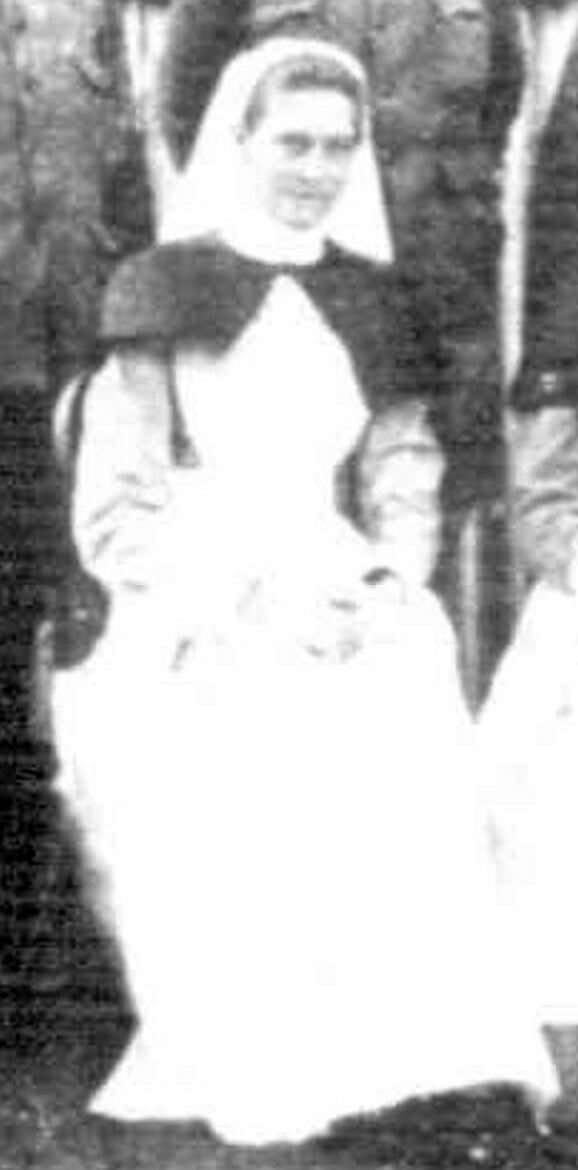
- Nurse Fanny Hines, 1900
- Born: 26 August 1864; Apsley, Victoria
- Died: 7 August 1900 (aged 35); Bulawayo, Rhodesia
- Military career
- Allegiance: Colony of Victoria
- Branch: Victorian Military Forces
- Service years: 1900
- Rank: Sister
- Conflicts: Second Boer War

Frances Emma "Fanny" Hines (26 August 1864 – 7 August 1900) was a nurse from Victoria, Australia, who served in the Second Boer War. She was the first Australian woman to die on active service.

== Early life ==
Frances Emma Hines was born on 26 August 1864 in Apsley, Victoria, the fourth daughter of Francis Patrick Hines and his wife Eleanor Mary Caroline (née Brewer). She attended the Fairlight Private Girls School in East St Kilda (later the Clyde School) and then trained as a nurse at the Melbourne Hospital for Sick Children.

== Military service ==
In March 1900, Sister Hines was one of ten trained nurses who travelled on the Euryalus to South Africa with the Victorian Citizen Bushmen.

Hines was nursing at Enkeldoorn with sole responsibility for 26 patients, which damaged her own health. She died on 7 August 1900 from pneumonia aggravated by malnutrition in an army hospital in Bulawayo, Rhodesia (now Zimbabwe). She was buried with full military honours in Bulawayo. A marble cross was placed on her grave, funded by her fellow nurses and Victorian Citizen Bushmen. On 27 September 1901, a tablet to her memory was unveiled by Major-General Downes at Fairlight School, erected through subscriptions of her former classmates.
