= Thomas Tatchell =

Australian cricketer

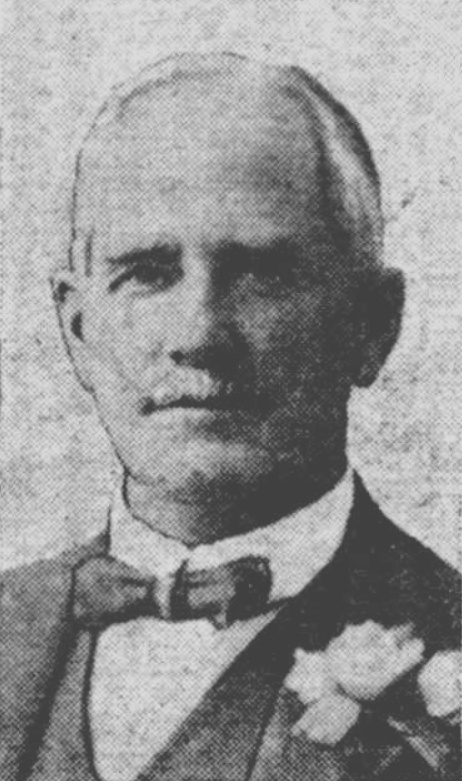

Personal information
- Born: 13 June 1867; Inglewood, Victoria, Australia
- Died: 18 October 1936 (aged 69); Melbourne, Australia

Domestic team information
- Years: Team
- 1894-1895: Victoria
- Source: Cricinfo, 26 July 2015

Thomas Tatchell (13 June 1867 – 18 October 1936) was an Australian cricketer. He played two first-class cricket matches for Victoria between 1894 and 1895.

Tatchell was born into a sporting family, with all his brothers being active sportsmen. He attended Wesley College in his youth and played football in Bendigo. After moving to Melbourne he became a cricketer and he eventually captained both South Melbourne and Richmond in district cricket and he represented Victoria in first-class cricket. He also represented Victoria in inter-state tennis, playing competitively for over twenty years. In 1919 he took up bowls and became captain of the Heidelberg Bowls Club.

== See also ==
- List of Victoria first-class cricketers
