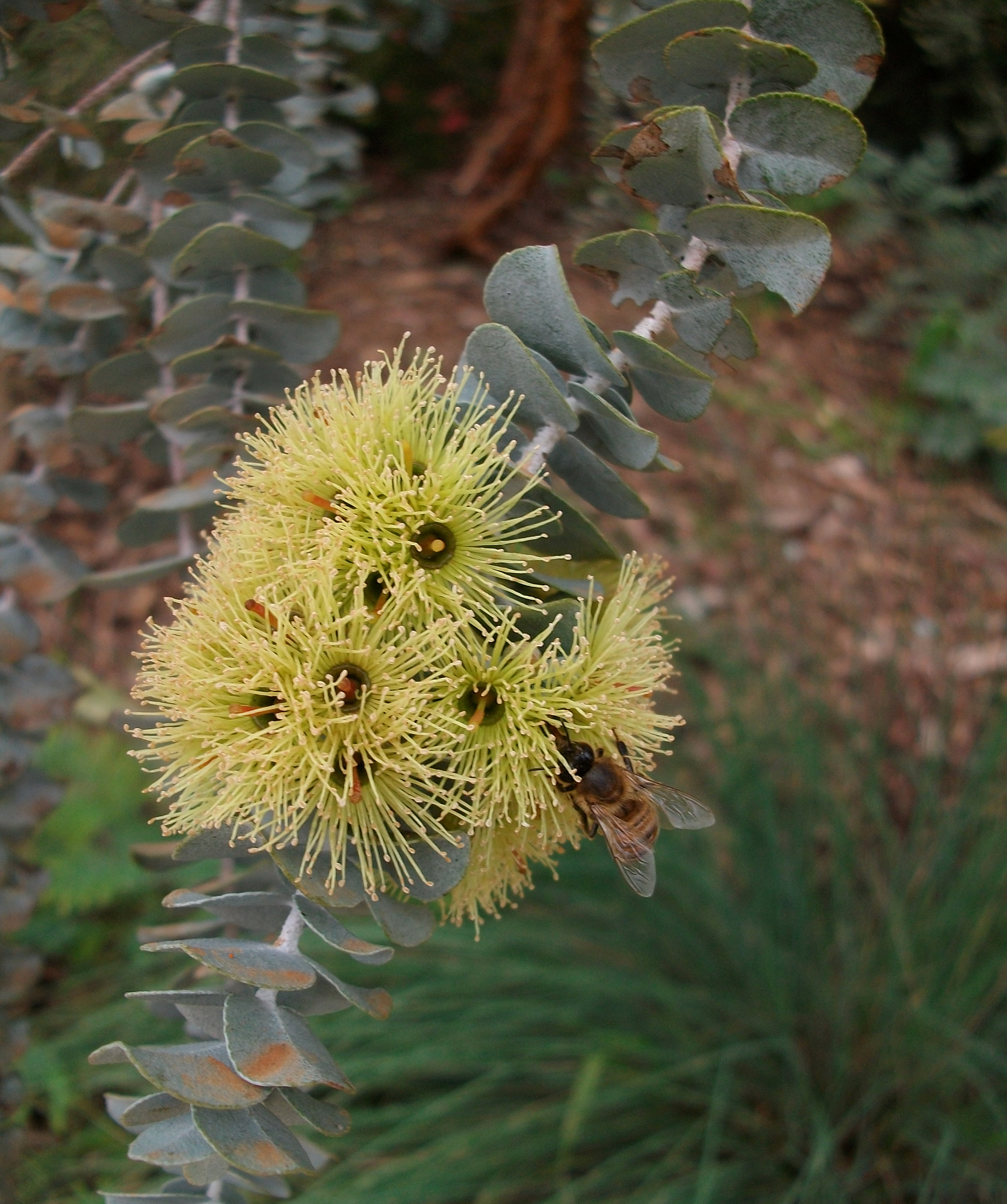
- Eucalyptus krueseana leaves and flowers.
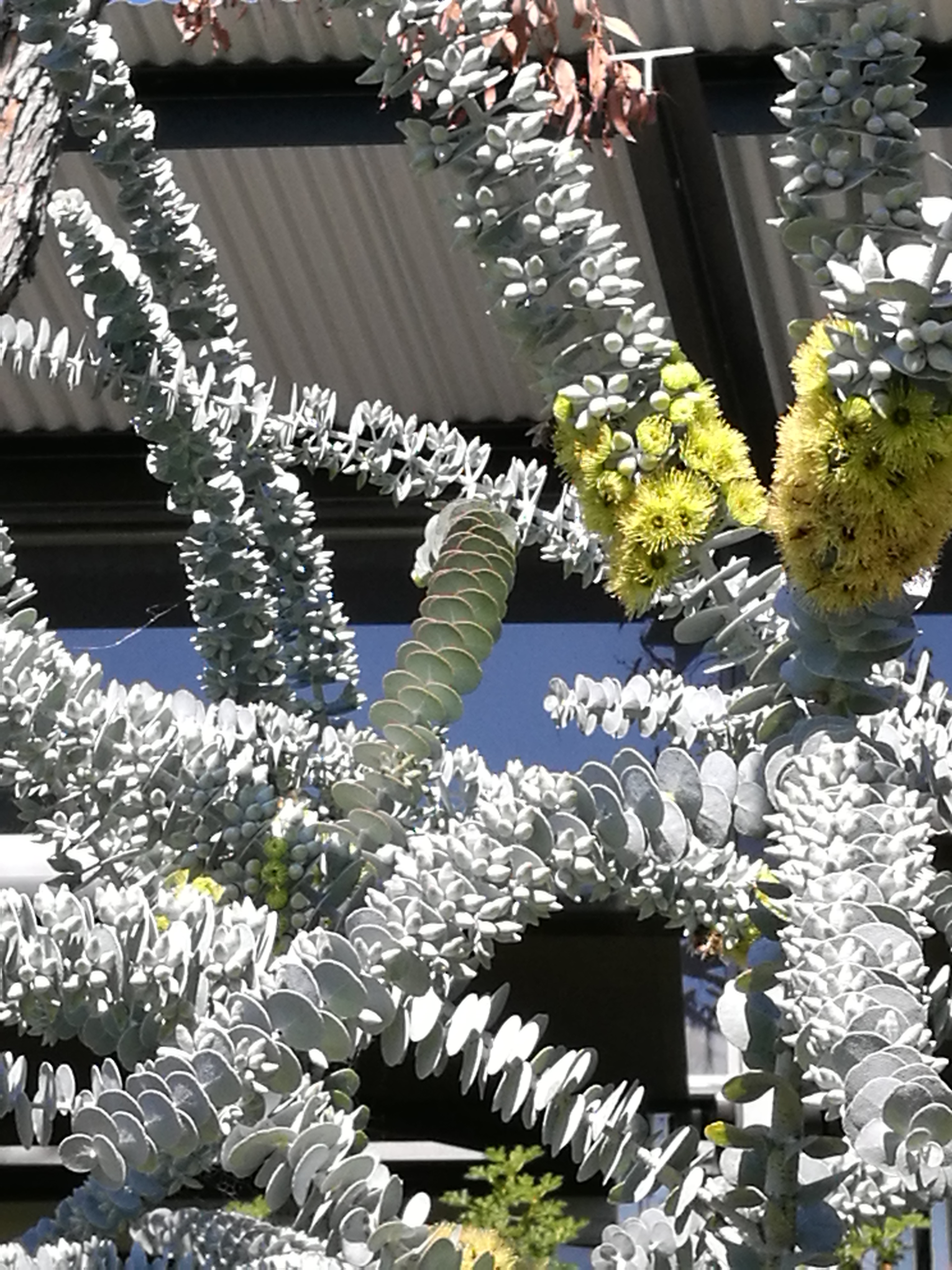

Conservation status
- Priority Four — Rare Taxa (DEC)

Scientific classification
- Kingdom: Plantae
- Clade: Tracheophytes
- Clade: Angiosperms
- Clade: Eudicots
- Clade: Rosids
- Order: Myrtales
- Family: Myrtaceae
- Genus: Eucalyptus
- Species: E. kruseana

Binomial name
- Eucalyptus kruseana F.Muell.
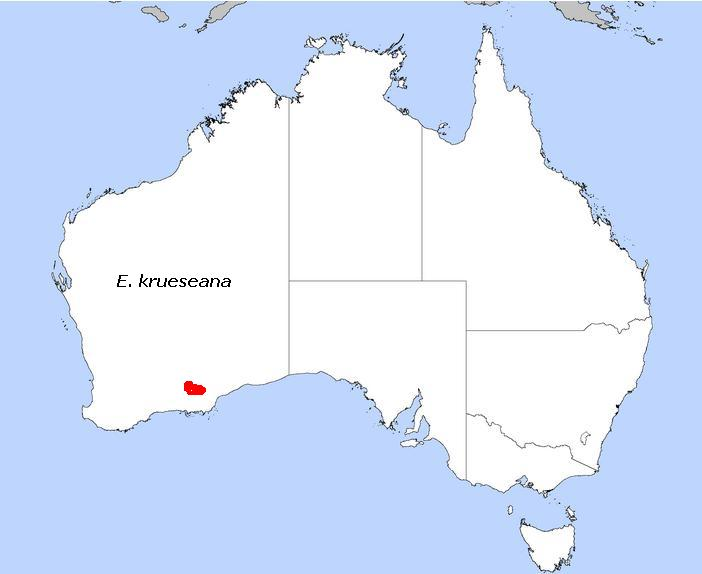

Synonyms
- Eucalyptus morrisonii Maiden

= Eucalyptus kruseana =

Book-leaf mallee

Species of eucalyptus

Habit in Kalgoorlie, Western Australia

Eucalyptus krueseana, commonly known as book-leaf mallee, is a mallee that is endemic to inland Western Australia. It has smooth bark that is shed in ribbons, a crown of sessile, juvenile leaves, glaucous flower buds and greenish yellow flowers.

== Description ==
Eucalyptus kruseana is a straggly mallee with smooth coppery to dark grey bark that is shed in ribbons, but rough and fibrous near the base. It typically grows to a height of 2–3.5 m (6 ft 7 in – 11 ft 6 in) with white, waxy branchlets. Juvenile leaves are arranged in opposite pairs, sessile, heart-shaped to more or less round, 10–25 mm (0.39–0.98 in) long and wide, and the same dull grey colour on both sides. Adult leaves rarely develop in the crown. The flower buds are arranged in groups of seven on an unbranched peduncle 4–10 mm (0.16–0.39 in) long, each bud on a pedicel 1–3 mm (0.039–0.118 in) long. Mature buds are oval, glaucous, 7–10 mm (0.28–0.39 in) long and 3–5 mm (0.12–0.20 in) wide with a conical operculum. Greenish yellow flowers appear mainly from June to September but have been observed in February, March and May. The fruit is a barrel-shaped to cup-shaped, woody capsule.

== Taxonomy and naming ==
Eucalyptus kruseana was first formally described by the botanist Ferdinand von Mueller in 1895 in the Australasian Journal of Pharmacy.

In 1910, Joseph Maiden described Eucalyptus morrisonii in the Journal of the Natural History and Science Society of Western Australia, but in 1920 accepted that it was the same as E. kruseana and that E. morrisonii is therefore a synonym.

The specific epithet honours John Kruse, a German born pharmacist, who worked in Melbourne.

== Distribution and habitat ==
It has a restricted distribution on granite hills and among granite outcrops east and south east of Kalgoorlie, from Cardunia Rock north of Karonie to Binyarinyinna Rock and east of Higginsville, usually found on or near granite rock in south eastern Western Australia where it grows in sandy-loam soils.

== Use in horticulture ==
Like most mallees the small tree forms multiple stems from a lignotuber, but in cultivation E . kruseana often forms a single stem. Book-leaf mallee is sold commercially as tube stock or in seed form. It is drought and frost tolerant and prefers a full sun position. Sold as an ornamental for small or large gardens, it is used for privacy screening, for shade, for hedging or as a feature. It can withstand hard pruning to give the plant a better shape.

== See also ==
- List of Eucalyptus species
