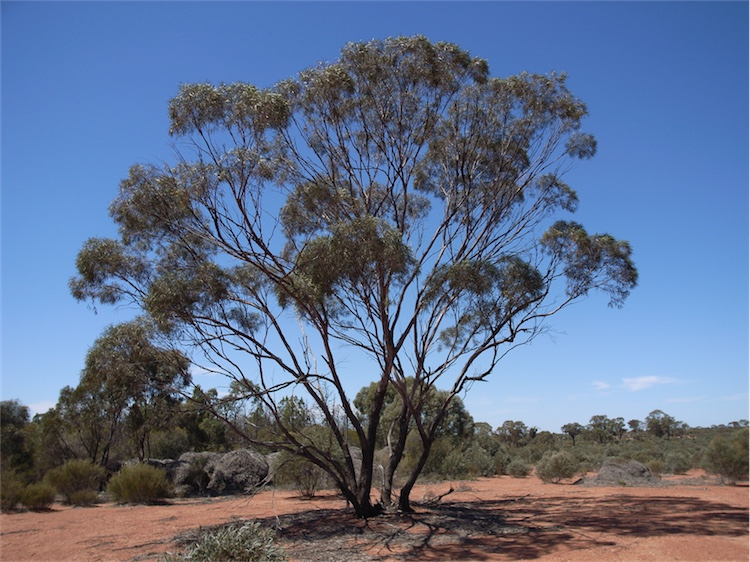
- Habit near West Wyalong

Scientific classification
- Kingdom: Plantae
- Clade: Tracheophytes
- Clade: Angiosperms
- Clade: Eudicots
- Clade: Rosids
- Order: Myrtales
- Family: Myrtaceae
- Genus: Eucalyptus
- Species: E. polybractea

Binomial name
- Eucalyptus polybractea R.T.Baker

= Eucalyptus polybractea =

Blue-leaved mallee

Species of eucalyptus

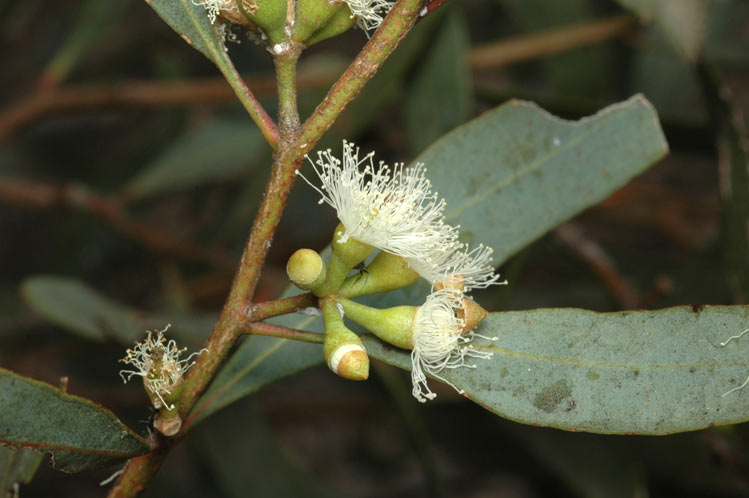
Flower buds and flowers

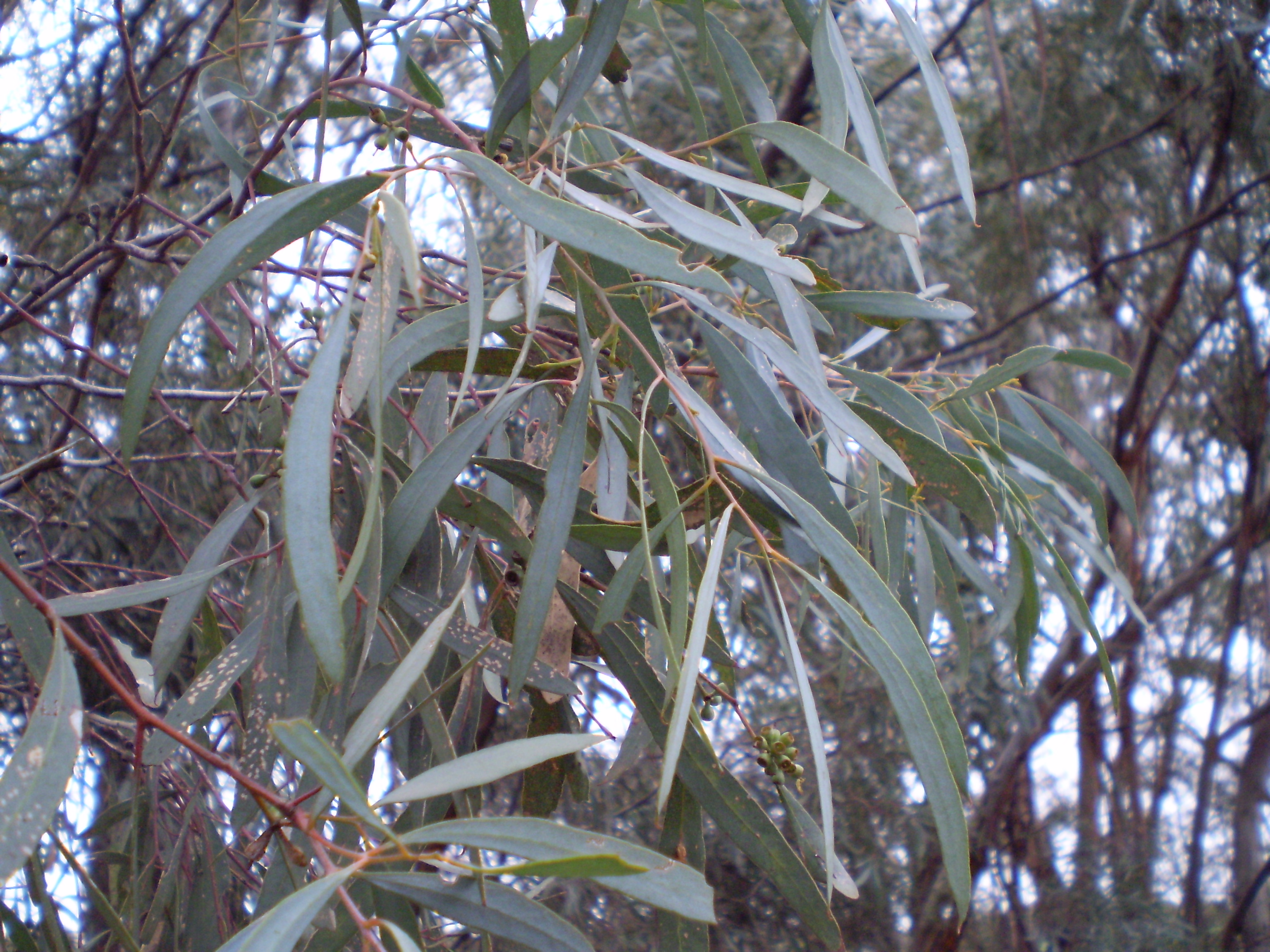
Leaves

Eucalyptus polybractea, commonly known as the blue-leaved mallee or simply blue mallee, is a species of mallee that is endemic to south-eastern Australia. It has rough, fibrous or flaky bark on the lower part of the trunk, smooth greyish or brownish bark above, lance-shaped adult leaves, flower buds in groups of between seven and eleven, white flowers and cup-shaped or barrel-shaped fruit.

== Description ==
Eucalyptus polybractea is a mallee that typically grows to a height of 8–10 m (26–33 ft) and forms a lignotuber. It has rough, fibrous or flaky, greyish to brownish bark on the lower part of the trunk, smooth greyish to brownish bark above that is shed in ribbons. Young plants and coppice regrowth have bluish to glaucous, linear to lance-shaped leaves that are 40–150 mm (1.6–5.9 in) long and 3–16 mm (0.12–0.63 in) wide. Adult leaves are the same shade of bluish green on both sides, lance-shaped, 60–170 mm (2.4–6.7 in) long and 4–20 mm (0.16–0.79 in) wide, tapering to a petiole 4–15 mm (0.16–0.59 in) long. The flower buds are arranged in leaf axils in groups of seven, nine or eleven on an unbranched peduncle 4–12 mm (0.16–0.47 in) long, the individual buds on pedicels up to 4 mm (0.16 in) long. Mature buds are club-shaped to diamond-shaped, 4–6 mm (0.16–0.24 in) long and 3–4 mm (0.12–0.16 in) wide with a conical to rounded operculum. Flowering mainly occurs from March to August and the flowers are white. The fruit is a woody, cup-shaped or barrel-shaped capsule 4–7 mm (0.16–0.28 in) long and 3–5 mm (0.12–0.20 in) wide with the valves near rim level.

== Taxonomy and naming ==
Eucalyptus polybractea was first formally described in 1901 by Richard Thomas Baker in Proceedings of the Linnean Society of New South Wales from specimens collected near West Wyalong by Richard Hind Cambage. The specific epithet (polybractea) is from the ancient Greek poly- and the Latin bractea, referring to the many bracts of this species, although many eucalypts have "many bracts" at the base of immature flowers.

In 2018, Kevin James Rule described two subspecies, polybractea and suberea but the names have not been accepted by the Australian Plant Census.

== Distribution ==
Blue-leaved mallee has a wide, but sporadic distribution around West Wyalong in New South Wales and between Stawell and Bendigo in Victoria. In grows in mallee shrubland on loamy soils.

== Uses ==
=== Essential oil ===
Eucalyptus polybractea leaves are used to produce eucalyptus oil with very high levels of cineole (up to 91%), yielding 0.7-5% fresh weight overall. The oil is primarily used medicinally and for flavoring. The aroma of the oil is described as "sweet, camphoreous, fresh, cooling, minty".

The species is extensively farmed in West Wyalong for its essential oils, which are extracted locally by steam distillation; much of the required energy being provided by burning stems and stalks, which contain little of the valuable oil.

=== Carbon sequestration ===
This eucalypt is the most commonly planted tree in Australia as part of carbon offset programs. Primarily, this is because the blue-leaved mallee is native to Australia, can grow effectively in drought conditions and, provided it is not burned or harvested, can store a great deal of carbon quickly.

== See also ==
- List of Eucalyptus species
