= Mallee (habit) =

Growth habit of certain eucalypt species

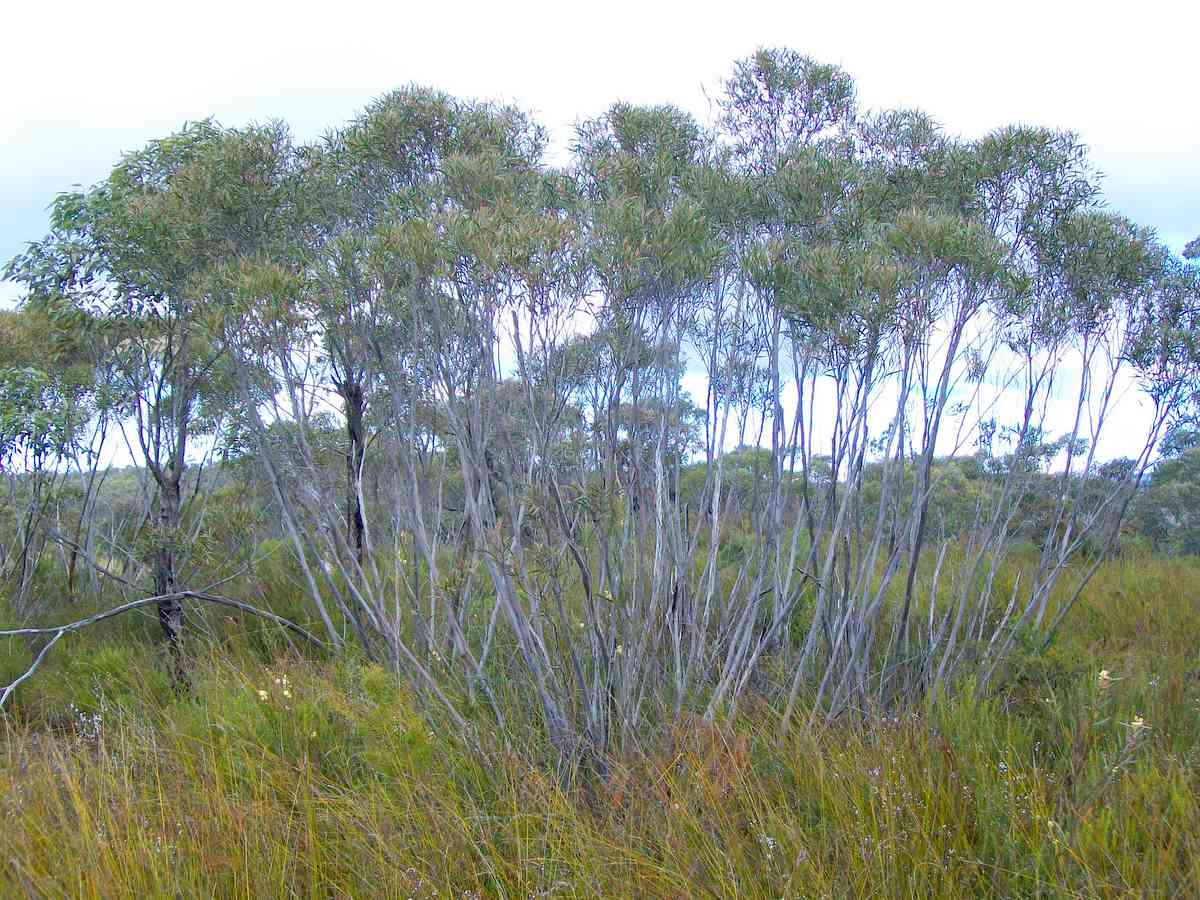
Typical form of a mallee, Eucalyptus stricta

Mallee are trees or shrubs, mainly certain species of eucalypts, which grow with multiple stems springing from an underground lignotuber or xylopodium, usually to a height of no more than 10 m (33 ft). The term is widely used for trees with this growth habit across southern Australia, in the states of Western Australia, South Australia, New South Wales and Victoria, and has given rise to other uses of the term, including the ecosystems where such trees predominate, specific geographic areas within some of the states and as part of various species' names.

== Etymology ==
The word is thought to originate from the word mali, meaning water, in the Wemba Wemba language, an Aboriginal Australian language of southern New South Wales and Victoria. The word is also used in the closely related Woiwurrung language and other Aboriginal languages of Victoria, South Australia, and southern New South Wales.

== Overview ==
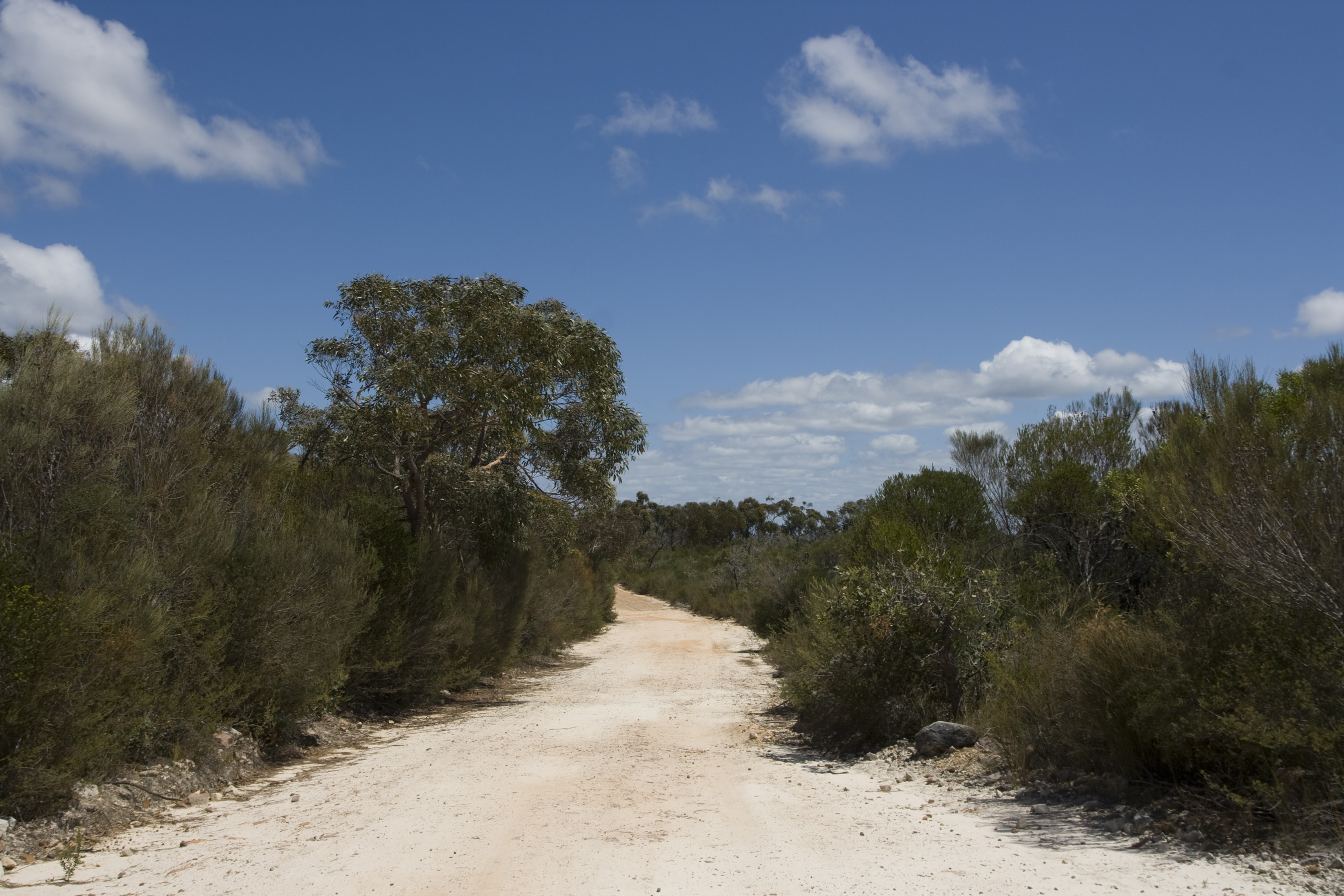
Mallee formation at Ku-ring-gai Chase National Park, northern Sydney

The term mallee is used describe various species of trees or woody plants, mainly of the genus Eucalyptus, which grow with multiple stems springing from an underground bulbous woody structure called a lignotuber, or mallee root, usually to a height of no more than 10 m (33 ft). The term is widely used for trees with this across southern Australia, across the states of Western Australia, South Australia, New South Wales and Victoria. The term is also applied to other eucalypts with a similar growth habit, in particular those in the closely related genera Corymbia and Angophora.

Some of the species grow as single-stemmed trees initially, but recover in mallee form if burnt to the ground by bushfire.

Over 50 per cent of eucalypt species are mallees, and they are mostly slow-growing and tough. The lignotuber enables the plant to regenerate after fire, wind damage or other type of trauma.

== Range ==
Mallees are the dominant vegetation throughout semi-arid areas of Australia with reliable winter rainfall. Within this area, they form extensive woodlands and shrublands covering over 250,000 km^{2} (97,000 sq mi) in New South Wales, north-western Victoria, southern South Australia and southern Western Australia, with the greatest extent being in South Australia (118,531 square kilometres (45,765 sq mi)).

There are also some species found in the Northern Territory, namely Eucalyptus gamophylla (blue mallee), Eucalyptus pachycarpa and Eucalyptus setosa.

== Farming on mallee land ==
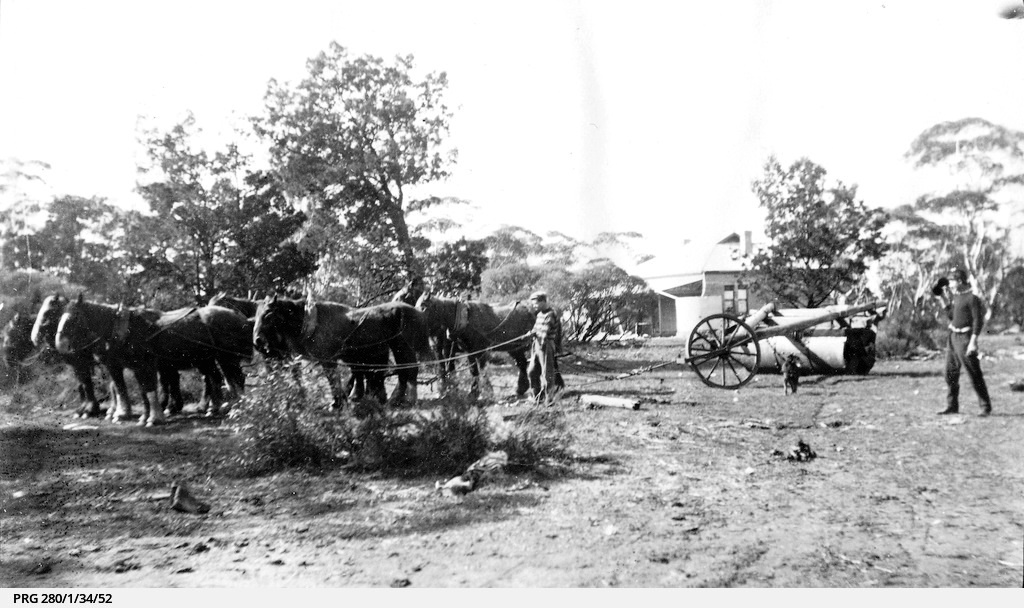
Scrub/mallee roller being used in South Australian mallee, c.1922

Grubbing the land of mallee stumps for agricultural purposes was difficult for early settler farmers, as the land could not be easily ploughed and sown even after the trees were removed. In the colony of South Australia in the late 19th century, legislation which encouraged closer settlement made it even tougher for farmers to make a living.

Grubbing the mallee lands was a laborious and expensive task estimated at £2–7 per acre, and the government offered a £200 reward for the invention of an effective machine that would remove the stumps. To assist with the challenges of farming on mallee lands, some settlers turned their minds to the invention of technologies that could make some of the tasks easier. First the scrub or mallee roller was invented, which flattened the stumps and other vegetation, after which it would all be burnt and crops sown. The technique became known as "mullenising", as the invention of the device was attributed to a farmer called Mullen.

A few years later the stump jump plough was invented on the Yorke Peninsula by Richard Bowyer Smith and perfected by his brother, Clarence Herbert Smith. This machine had individually movable ploughshares, enabling the whole plough to move over stumps rather than having to steer around them, and proved a great success.

== Uses of the term ==
The term is applied to both the tree itself and the whole plant community in which it predominates, giving rise to the classification of mallee woodlands and shrublands as one of Australia's major vegetation groups.

Several common names of eucalypt species have "mallee" in them, such as the Blue Mountains mallee (Eucalyptus stricta) and blue mallee (E. gamophylla and E. polybractea).

The term is used in the phrase strong as a mallee bull, and is colloquially used for any remote or isolated area, or as a synonym for outback.

== Species ==
Widespread mallee species include:

- E. dumosa (white mallee)
- E. socialis (red mallee)
- E. gracilis (yorrell)
- E. oleosa (red mallee)
- E. incrassata (ridge-fruited mallee)
- E. diversifolia (soap mallee)

The following four Western Australian species can be found in the Waite Arboretum in Adelaide, and are suitable for gardens:

- Eucalyptus pleurocarpa, or tallerack
- Eucalyptus pyriformis, or dowerin rose
- Eucalyptus preissiana, or bell-fruited mallee
- Eucalyptus grossa, or coarse-leaved mallee

== See also ==
- Sydney Sandstone Ridgetop Woodland
- Eastern Suburbs Banksia Scrub
