= Caloplaca aliciae =

Scientific classification
- Kingdom: Fungi
- Division: Ascomycota
- Class: Lecanoromycetes
- Order: Teloschistales
- Family: Teloschistaceae
- Genus: Caloplaca
- Species: C. aliciae

Binomial name
- Caloplaca aliciae S.Y.Kondr., Kärnefelt & Elix (2007)
- Holotype site: Hann Range, Northern Territory

Species of lichen

Caloplaca aliciae is a species of saxicolous (rock-dwelling), crustose lichen in the family Teloschistaceae. It is found in Australia. It is characterised by a thallus that can grow up to 2 cm wide, featuring colours from dull pink to dull brown, with small, dispersed, flat areoles that are irregularly shaped and occasionally dissected by cracks, displaying a whitish, dull pink, or dull orange-brown surface. Its apothecia (fruiting bodies) are lecanorine in form, initially immersed but often rising above the areoles, with each areole containing one or two apothecia that have a thalline margin matching the thallus colour.

== Taxonomy ==
The lichen was first formally described in 2007 by the lichenologists Sergey Kondratyuk, Ingvar Kärnefelt, and John Alan Elix. The type specimen was collected from Native Gap in Hann Range (Northern Territory) at an elevation of 700 m (2,300 ft), where it was found growing on south-facing rock ledges. The species epithet refers to its type locality, Alice Springs.

== Description ==
Caloplaca aliciae has a thallus that can reach up to 2 cm in width, with a colour ranging from dull pink to dull brown. The thallus is typically indistinct and areolate, comprising small, dispersed, flat areoles and minute apothecia that are immersed in the thallus. The areoles, measuring 0.4–0.7 mm wide and 120–150 μm thick, are irregularly shaped, often elongated, and sometimes dissected by tangential cracks up to 75 μm wide. These areoles are typically dispersed, occasionally aggregated, and separated by broad cracks, revealing the rock surface beneath. The surface of the areoles is characterised by a whitish, dull pink, or dull orange-brown colouration and has a matt or slightly eroded texture.

The apothecia of Caloplaca aliciae are lecanorine in form, ranging from 0.2 to 0.6 mm in diameter. Initially immersed, they eventually elevate distinctly, sometimes rising slightly above the level of the areole. Each areole typically contains one to two apothecia. The thalline margin of the apothecia is the same colour as the thallus, with shades of dull pink, whitish-brown, or brownish. The exciple is paraplectenchymatous, with a hymenium reaching up to 100 μm in height and a yellowish-brown epithecium. The subhymenium is approximately 60 μm thick, with an algal layer below the true exciple. Paraphyses are slightly widened towards the tips, and asci tend to contain spores of varying sizes. Ascospores are slightly attenuated at the ends, measuring 12–14 by 5–6 μm, with a septum thickness of 5–8 μm.

== Similar species ==
Caloplaca aliciae is distinguished by its flat, very dispersed, small areoles, and tiny apothecia. The presence of cracks between areoles of similar size gives the species a distinctly scattered, areolate thallus appearance. It bears some resemblance to the coastal species Tarasginia whinrayi in terms of slightly dissected areoles. However, T. whinrayi differs in having yellow-orange dissected lobes, a verrucose central thallus part, zeorine apothecia with thick thalline margins, slightly shorter ascospores, and narrower ascospore septum. Unlike C. aliciae, T. whinrayi is commonly found in sun-exposed coastal locations, growing on coastal rocks.

== Habitat and distribution ==
Caloplaca aliciae is known to inhabit dry, weathered granite rocks. It is considered the least common of the 'dull pink' inland species of Caloplaca (in the broad sense) in Australia, with its known distribution limited to central Australia and the Northern Territory.

== See also ==
- List of Caloplaca species
