= Stump-jump plough =

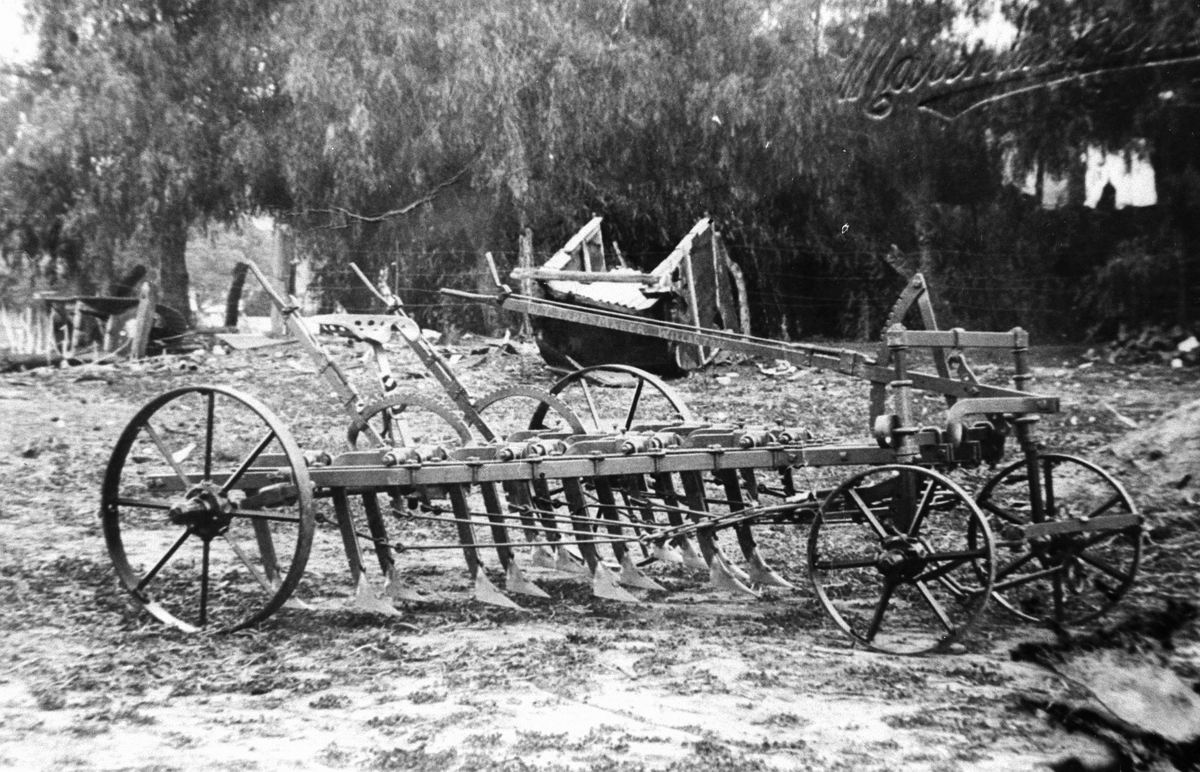
Stump-jump plough

The stump-jump plough, also known as the stump-jumping plough, is a kind of plough invented in South Australia by Richard Bowyer Smith and Clarence Herbert Smith to solve the particular problem of preparing mallee lands for cultivation.

== The problem ==
Mallee scrub originally covered large parts of southern Australia, and because of its growth habit, the trees were difficult to remove completely, because the tree would shoot again after burning, cutting down or other kinds of damage. The large roots, known as lignotubers, remained in the ground, making it very difficult to plough the soil.

In South Australia, crown land was offered under the Scrub Lands Act 1866 to farmers on lease, with the option of purchasing after 21 years at the price of £1 per acre. The "Strangways Act" followed in 1869, which allowed crown land to be bought on credit, with encouragement to clear the land of scrub for the purpose of more intensive agriculture such as growing grain crops and mixed farming. Closer settlement made it even tougher for farmers to make a living.

Grubbing the mallee lands was laborious and expensive £2–7 per acre, and the government offered a £200 reward for the invention of an effective machine that would remove the stumps.

== Scrub roller/mullenising ==
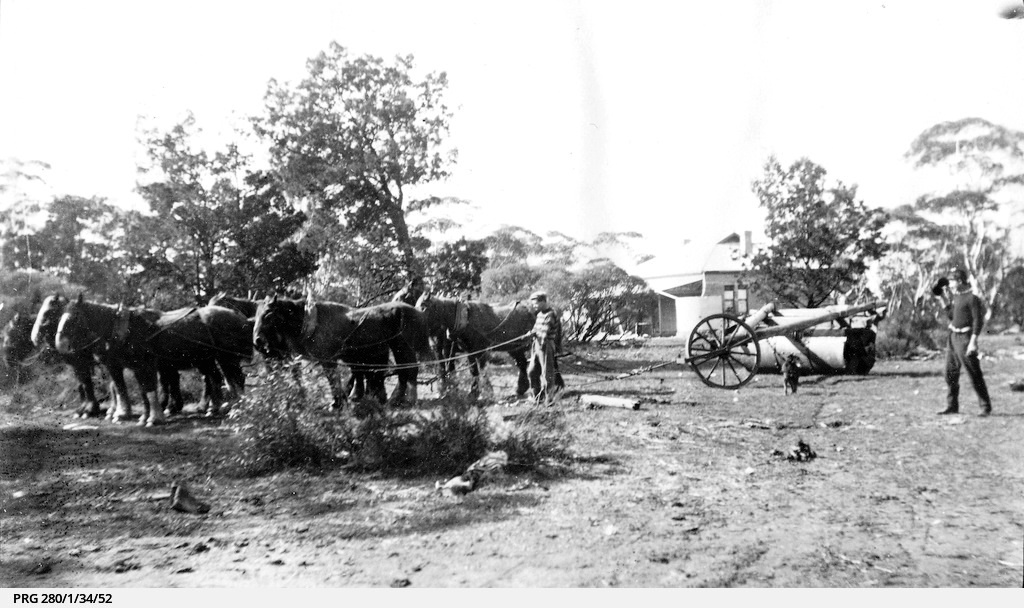
Scrub roller being used in South Australia, c.1922

The invention of the scrub roller, or mallee roller, was one solution. This was a heavy roller which was dragged over roughly cleared ground by horses or bullocks, crushing small trees, undergrowth and new shoots. After leaving the field to dry, the flattened vegetation was burnt. This process was known as mullenising, as the invention of the device was attributed to an Irish-born farmer from Wasleys called Charles Mullen. Mullen devised a contraption which included a heavy roller dragged behind a pair of logs fixed together to create a V-shape. A team of horses pulled the device at the pointed end of the V, dragging the roller behind it over a field covered in stumps. There is a memorial commemorating Mullen's invention at Wasleys, which describes the mullenising process slightly differently: "With Mullenising a forked log with spikes was used to cultivate the ground between the stumps, bringing the land into production much earlier than previous methods. The original forked log worked around the stumps...".

The fields could then be sown after running a spiked log across the ground, but the scrub roller still left the mallee stumps in the ground, making ploughing difficult, and the process had to be repeated each year until the mallee died, although the stumps remained. The method continued to be used into the early 20th century.

== Breakthrough ==
In June 1876 a special plough was invented by agricultural machinery apprentice Richard Bowyer Smith, and later developed and perfected by his brother, Clarence Herbert Smith, on the Yorke Peninsula (where the problem was particularly acute). The plough consisted of any number of hinged or pivoting ploughshares or blades (originally three), which worked independently of each other: when the blade encountered an underground obstacle like a mallee stump, it would rise out of the ground. Attached weights forced the blade back into the ground after the root was passed, allowing as much of the ground to be furrowed as possible. Although a little unorthodox, the plough in action appearing "like a ship in a storm", it proved remarkably effective, and was dubbed the "stump-jump" plough (also spelt without the hyphen).

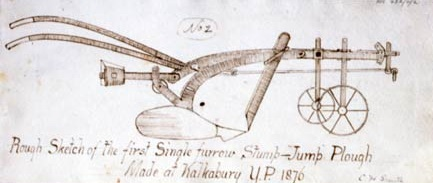
Plan of the original single-furrow plough

The first plough produced by Richard Smith was a three-furrow plough he called the "Vixen". Later that same year, Richard Smith demonstrated a single-furrow stump-jump plough which included a chain that dragged the bottom of the ploughshare back into the ground, known as the "bridle draught". This device was further enhanced by W. H. May of Wallaroo and William Heithersay of Peterborough and became a regular feature of stump-jump ploughs.

Richard Smith's invention earned him a first prize at the Moonta Show in 1876 when he exhibited a prototype, and was later regarded as one of the most important agricultural inventions of the century. It became used throughout the British Commonwealth, and completely changed agricultural practices where it was adopted, as it allowed crops to be grown without removing stumps and rocks, thus saving a lot of work and time. Unfortunately, Richard was only able to afford temporary registration of his invention, and others (including his brother Clarence, who had been an early sceptic) started making their own versions and earning profits on them.

Another successful stump-jump plough was invented in 1877 by James Winchester Stott (1830–1907), who was a very prolific inventor (also inventing a cultivator, slasher, scarifier and double furrow plough), in Alma in the mid North of South Australia. Stott and Mellor Brothers, who had refined Stott's design, were jointly the first to patent a stump-jumping plough in Victoria.

The invention was hailed as a "complete revolution" and, in combination with the process of mullenising, was adopted almost universally across the mallee lands, even proving as useful in stony ground as it was in mallee country.

Albert Arnold (born in 1856 at Gawler, SA) reportedly improved on the design of the plough while doing his apprenticeship and working as a farmer in South Australia before moving to Sydney in 1882. While working for Joyner and Son, he made a stump-jump plough and was the first to introduce the invention in New South Wales.

Richard Smith's claim to be the inventor of the plough was contested unsuccessfully by Stott and Charles Branson, and the South Australian government, after a thorough investigation into the matter, awarded £500 to Smith in 1882. They also gave him a gold medal and a parcel of 260 hectares (640 acres) of land near Ardrossan, but he packed up and moved to Western Australia in 1884, leaving Clarence to continue the business at Ardrossan. Clarence died in 1901 and his sons took over, running the business for about 30 years. A 1907 newspaper article commented that their factory was "one of the largest and best equipped of its kind in the Commonwealth".

== On display ==
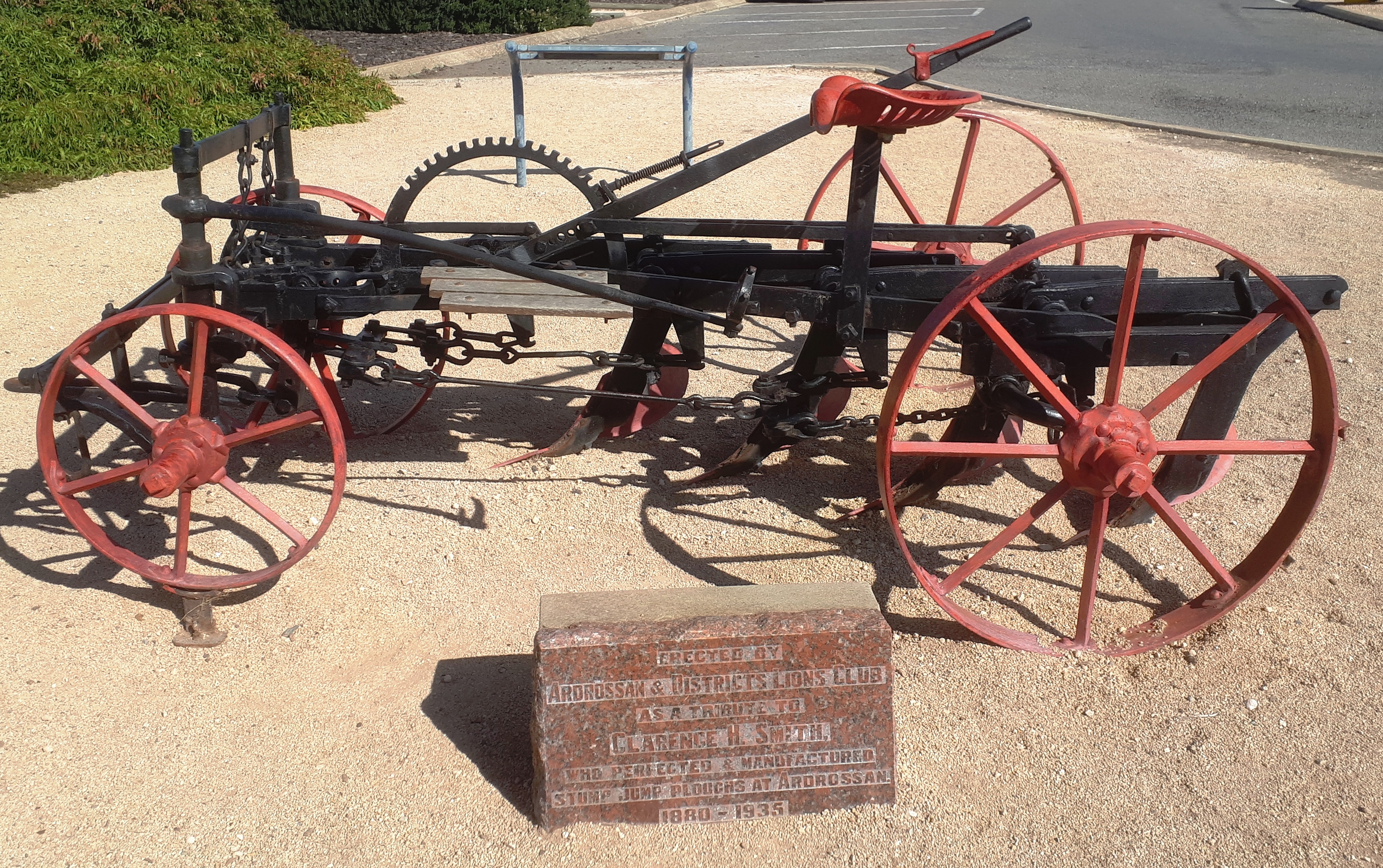
Stump-jump plough at Ardrossan

There are two stump-jump ploughs on display at Ardrossan, a significant port town on the Yorke Peninsula. One is on top of the cliff at the eastern end of First Street. There is another in the Ardrossan Museum. The outdoor plough was fully restored and mounted outdoors in 1972, with a plaque commemorating Smith's invention donated by the local Lions Club. The one in the museum was added to the Engineering Heritage Register in 1987.

Albert Arnold donated his double-furrow stump-jump plough, made in 1882–3, to the Technological Museum (now Powerhouse Museum, part of the Museum of Applied Arts & Sciences) in Sydney, in 1926. It is still on display.

== Recognition ==
In November 2026, the Royal Australian Mint issued a five-coin set commemorating various inventions, one of which celebrates the stump-jump plough. The others show a jaffle maker, black box flight recorder, baby safety capsule, and high-speed Wireless LAN (WLAN) technology.
