= Native Gap Conservation Reserve =

Protected area in the Northern Territory, Australia

- IUCN category V (protected landscape/seascape)
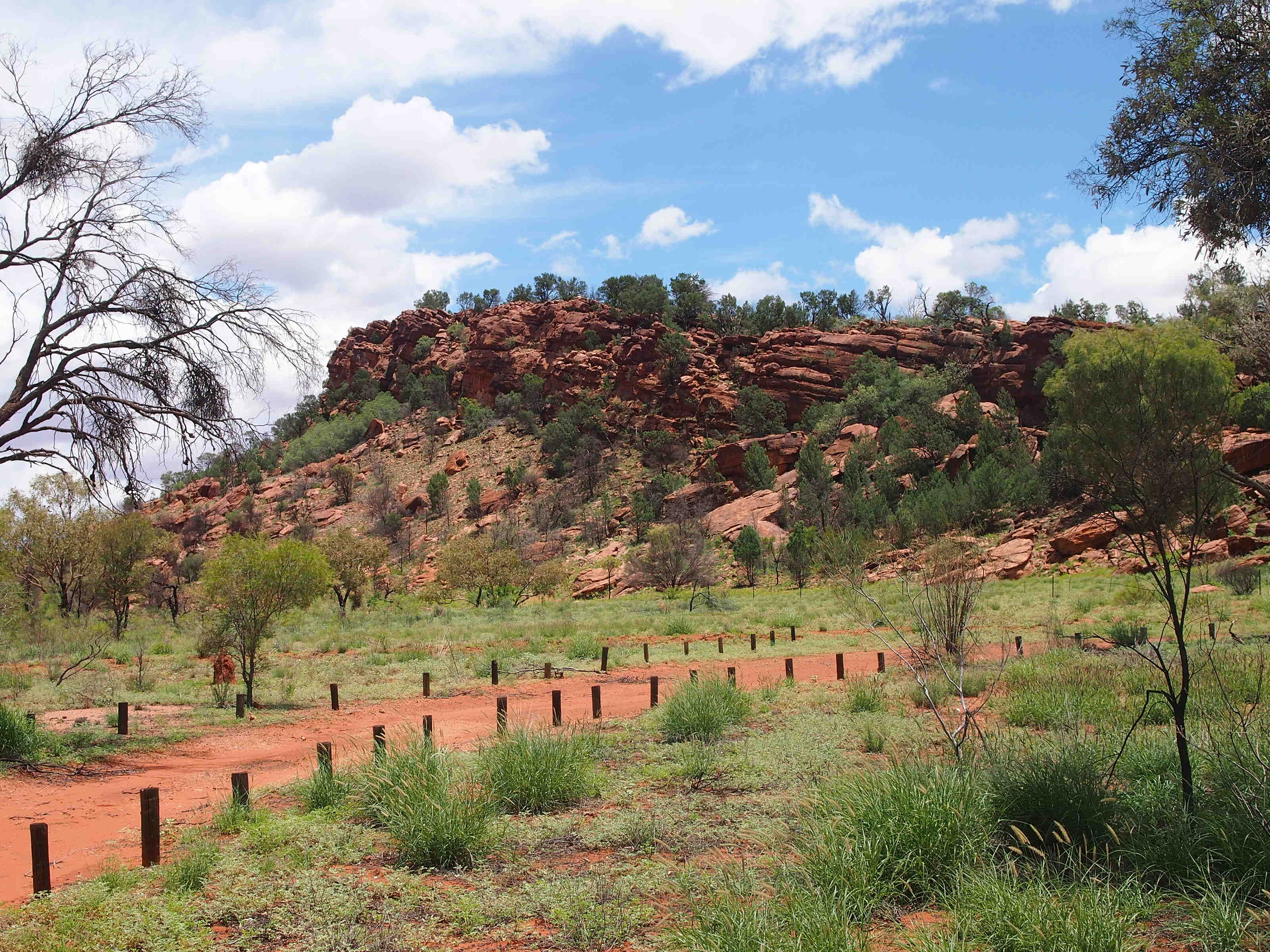
- Sandstone Ridge at Native gap

- Location within Northern Territory
- Location: Northern Territory
- Coordinates: 22°48′00″S 133°25′00″E
- Area: 11 ha (27 acres)
- Established: 26 May 1980
- Governing body: Parks and Wildlife Commission of the Northern Territory

Native Gap Conservation Reserve is a protected area in the Northern Territory of Australia.

It is located approximately 115 kilometres (71 mi) north of Alice Springs and 1,380 kilometres (857 mi) south of Darwin. The park is found just off along the Stuart Highway on the western side, via an unsealed track to a telecommunications tower in the nearby Hann Range.

The traditional owners of the area are the Arrente and Anmatyerr peoples, to whom it is a sacred site. The area is at the junction of many creation stories, and the name of the site in the Arrente dialect is Arurlte Artwatye, where Arurlte means "the top of the shoulders across the neck" and Artwatye means "gap".

The name of the site is derived from the 30-metre (98 ft) sandstone ridge that dominates the reserve standing above the surrounding Burt Plain.

The name of the area was first used in 1872 when one of the builders of the Overland Telegraph, W. W. Mills, reported to Charles Todd that they had come to a "Native Gap". He wrote of a "native well" that was situated in a gap in Hann's Range. The gap is thought to have taken the name of the well it contained.

In 1880 workers on the telegraph widened the gap by blasting the rock with explosives but in doing so destroying the water-holding rocks.

Flora found at the reserve include the native fig, white cypress pine found up on the ridge along with shrubs including Acacia monticola and Acacia melleodora, Eucalyptus gamophylla, and Eucalyptus sessilis also grow on top of the ridge even in the most exposed areas. Ironwood, desert bloodwood and ghost gums on the sandy flats. Desert grasses and spinifex are found throughout the reserve, with Drosera growing on the flats after rain. Other plants found through the reserve include Grevillea wickhamii and some Gossypium species.

Birdlife found on the reserve include western bowerbirds that feed on the native fig, little woodswallows, dusky grasswrens among the spinifex and brown quail after wet seasons. Other species found include whistling kite, rainbow bee-eater, willie wagtail, inland thornbill, variegated fairywren, mistletoebird, grey-headed honeyeater and Torresian crow.

Other fauna found on the reserve include the short-beaked echidna, euro and the black-footed rock-wallaby.

== See also ==
- Protected areas of the Northern Territory
