= Daviesia arthropoda =

Scientific classification
- Kingdom: Plantae
- Clade: Tracheophytes
- Clade: Angiosperms
- Clade: Eudicots
- Clade: Rosids
- Order: Fabales
- Family: Fabaceae
- Subfamily: Faboideae
- Genus: Daviesia
- Species: D. arthropoda

Binomial name
- Daviesia arthropoda F.Muell.

Species of flowering plant

Daviesia arthropoda is a species of flowering plant in the family Fabaceae and is endemic to Central Australia. It is a glabrous shrub with widely spreading branches, sharply-pointed, narrowly egg-shaped phyllodes with the narrower end towards the base, and yellow flowers with faint red markings.

== Description ==
Daviesia arthropoda is a glabrous shrub that typically grows to a height of 0.5–1 m (1 ft 8 in – 3 ft 3 in) and has branches spreading at right-angles to the main stem. The phyllodes are scattered along the branchlets and are sharply pointed, narrowly egg-shaped with the narrower end towards the base, mostly 20–40 mm (0.79–1.57 in) long and 3–5 mm (0.12–0.20 in) wide. The flowers are arranged singly or in pairs in axils on a peduncle 4–8 mm (0.16–0.31 in) long with bracts about 1 mm (0.039 in) long, each flower on a pedicel 3–8 mm (0.12–0.31 in) long. The five sepals are 3.0–3.5 mm (0.12–0.14 in) long and joined at the base, the lobes triangular and more or less equal in length. The standard petal is yellow with a red centre and about 4 mm (0.16 in) long, the wings yellow with a red base and about 4.5 mm (0.18 in) long and the keel sac-like, yellow and about 4 mm (0.16 in) long. Flowering occurs from April to August and the fruit is a flattened, triangular pod 7–8 mm (0.28–0.31 in) long.

== Taxonomy and naming ==
Daviesia arthropoda was first formally described in 1874 by Ferdinand von Mueller in Fragmenta Phytographiae Australiae from specimens collected in Kata Tjuta by Ernest Giles. The specific epithet (arthropoda) means "jointed foot", referring to the peduncles.

== Distribution ==
This species of pea grows on sand dunes with species of spinifex, such as Triodia basedowii, and Acacia species and is widespread and scattered in Central Australia from the Little Sandy Desert in Western Australia, through the Northern Territory and South Australia to western Queensland.

== Conservation status ==
This daviesia is classified as "Priority Three" by the Government of Western Australia Department of Biodiversity, Conservation and Attractions, meaning that it is poorly known and known from only a few locations but is not under imminent threat but as of "least concern" in the Northern Territory and Queensland.
