= Western pebble-mound mouse =

Conservation status
- Least Concern (IUCN 3.1)

Scientific classification
- Kingdom: Animalia
- Phylum: Chordata
- Class: Mammalia
- Order: Rodentia
- Family: Muridae
- Genus: Pseudomys
- Species: P. chapmani

Binomial name
- Pseudomys chapmani D.J. Kitchener, 1980

Species of rodent

Western pebble-mound mouse or Ngadji (Pseudomys chapmani) is a burrowing and mound building rodent in the family Muridae. They occur in the Pilbara, a remote region in the northwest of Australia.

== Taxonomy ==
The species was described by D.J. Kitchener in 1980. The population was formerly assumed to be species Pseudomys hermannsburgensis. The description is based on a specimen that was collected at Mount Meharry (West Angelas Mine Site). The specific honours the biologist Andrew Chapman, who worked at the mammal department of the W.A. Museum.

The common name according to the Census of Australian Vertebrates (ABRS 2001) is "Pebble-mound Mouse", a name given to sister taxon P. hermannsburgensis and so appended with 'Western' by the author of the species and others in later publications. The earlier name of 'sandy inland mouse' became applied in treatments as P. hermannsburgensis. The extant name of the animal in the language of its region is Ngadji.

The type specimen was collected by J.N. Dunlop in 1979, using a pit trapping method. A revision by Kitchener of specimens in the collection at the W.A. museum revealed morphological differences, observed in the Dunlop specimen, in previous collections of P. hermannsburgensis, including those made at Woodstock Homestead in the Pilbara.

== Description ==
The colour of the mouse's pelt is buff brown, darker to blackish at the head. The paws are white beneath and buff above, The underparts are white, up to the throat and mouth. The species resembles the related P. hermannburgensis, the morphology is distinguished by smaller ears, feet and tail. The feet do not exceed 16 millimetres in length.

== Habitat ==
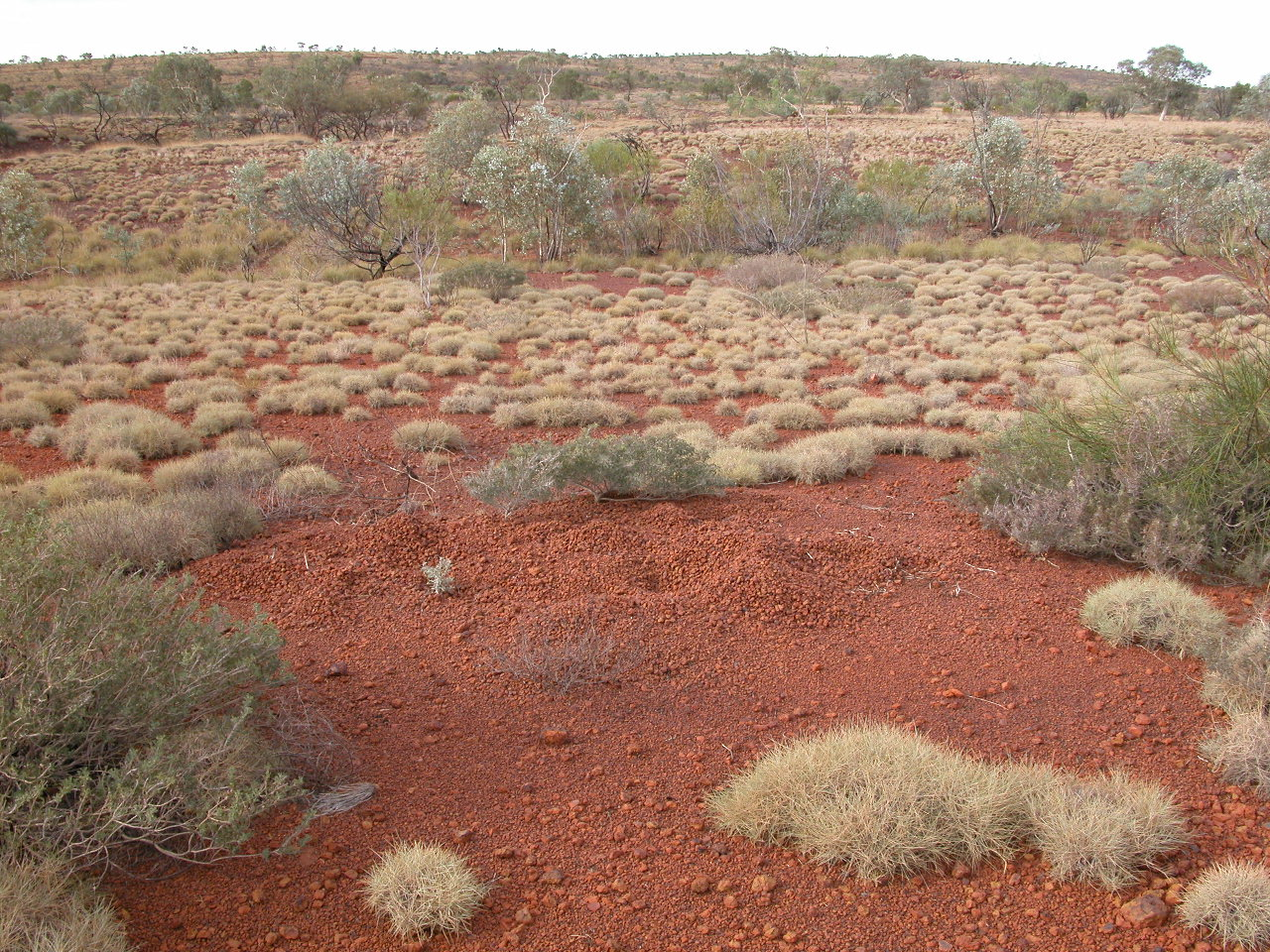
a mound, foreground centre, amongst Triodia hummocks in the Pilbara region

It is native to and found only in Western Australia, where it lives in pebbly soils in arid tussock grassland and acacia woodland. Like other pebble-mound mice, the western pebble-mound mouse creates its own microhabitat by scattering a mound of pebbles around its burrows. The air temperature around the pebbles warms up faster in the morning than the pebbles themselves, causing the formation of small droplets of dew by condensation.

The vegetation at the preferred habitat, hummock grasslands, is Triodia basedowii, Cassia. Acacia and Ptilotus, and it is associated with eroding sands at natural features which expose small stones (pebbles). The species at the type location were the spinifex Triodia basedowii and T. pungens, Acacia aneura, and Cassia desolata and C. helmsii, these cassias intermittently occur with Eucalyptus gamophylla and E. oleosa at the surrounding gibber plain.

== Status ==
The species occurs as disjunct populations within its range. The range is subject to changes in land use resulting in loss of habitat, and noted as contracting.

According to the 2008 IUCN Red List of Threatened Species, the species is restricted to the non-coastal, central and eastern parts of the Pilbara, Western Australia. It was formerly more widespread.
