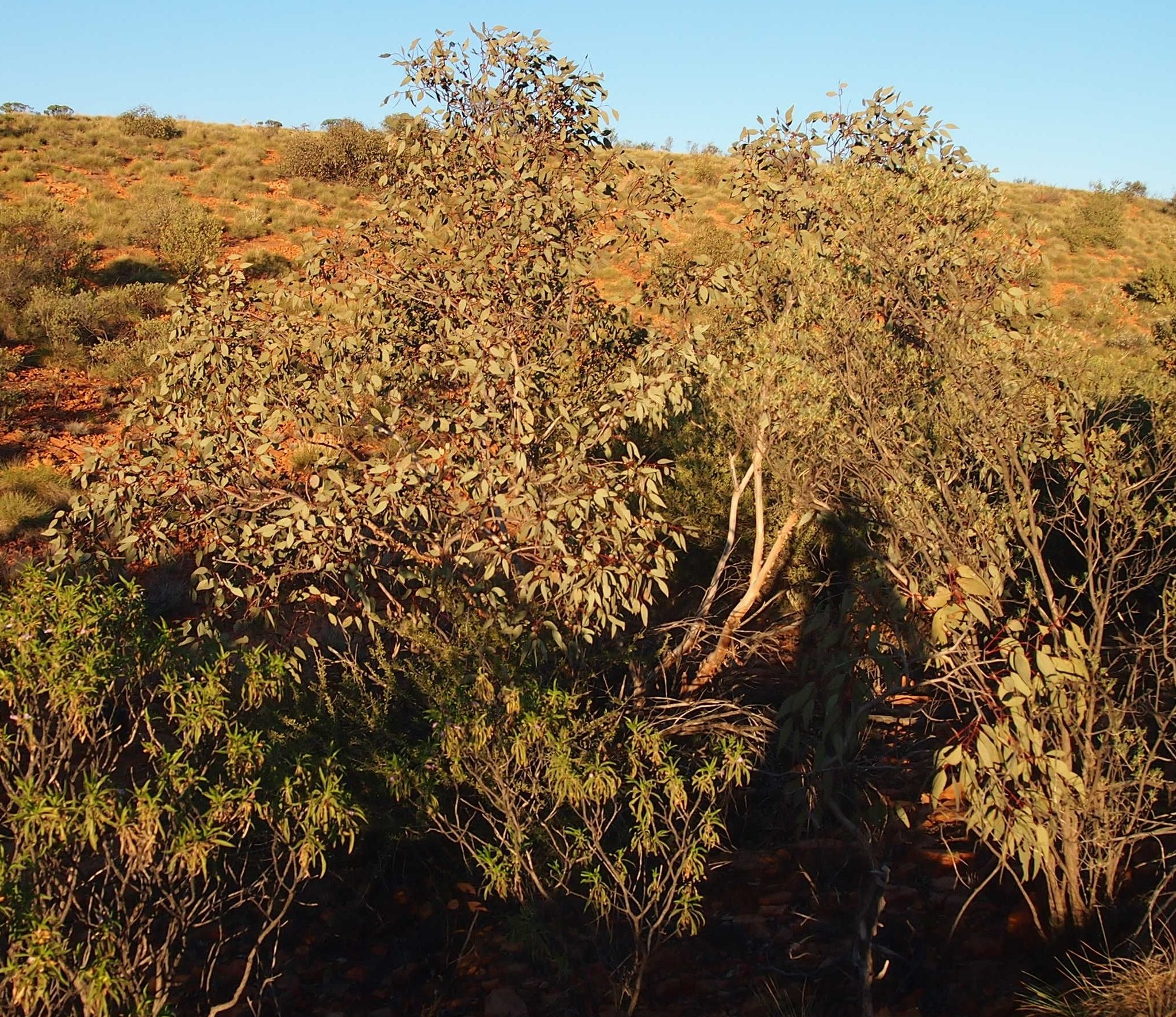
- Eucalyptus sessilis habit

Scientific classification
- Kingdom: Plantae
- Clade: Embryophytes
- Clade: Tracheophytes
- Clade: Spermatophytes
- Clade: Angiosperms
- Clade: Eudicots
- Clade: Rosids
- Order: Myrtales
- Family: Myrtaceae
- Genus: Eucalyptus
- Species: E. sessilis

Binomial name
- Eucalyptus sessilis (Maiden) Blakely

Synonyms
- Eucalyptus pachyphylla var. sessilis

= Eucalyptus sessilis =

Finke River mallee

Species of eucalyptus

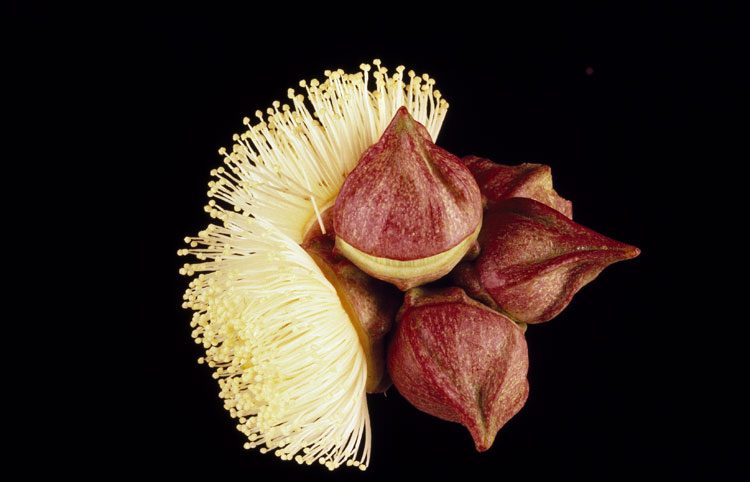
Flower buds and flowers

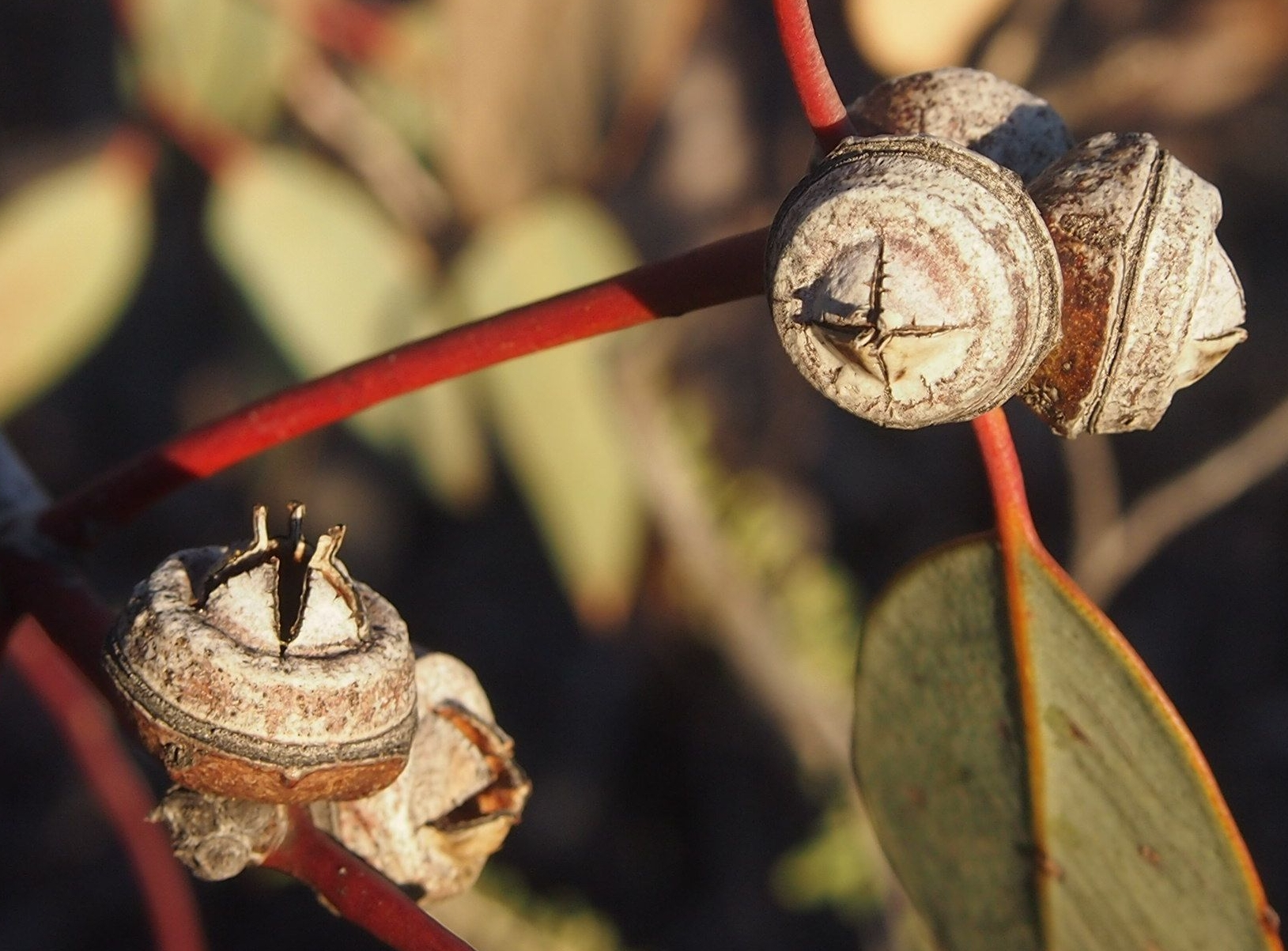
Fruit

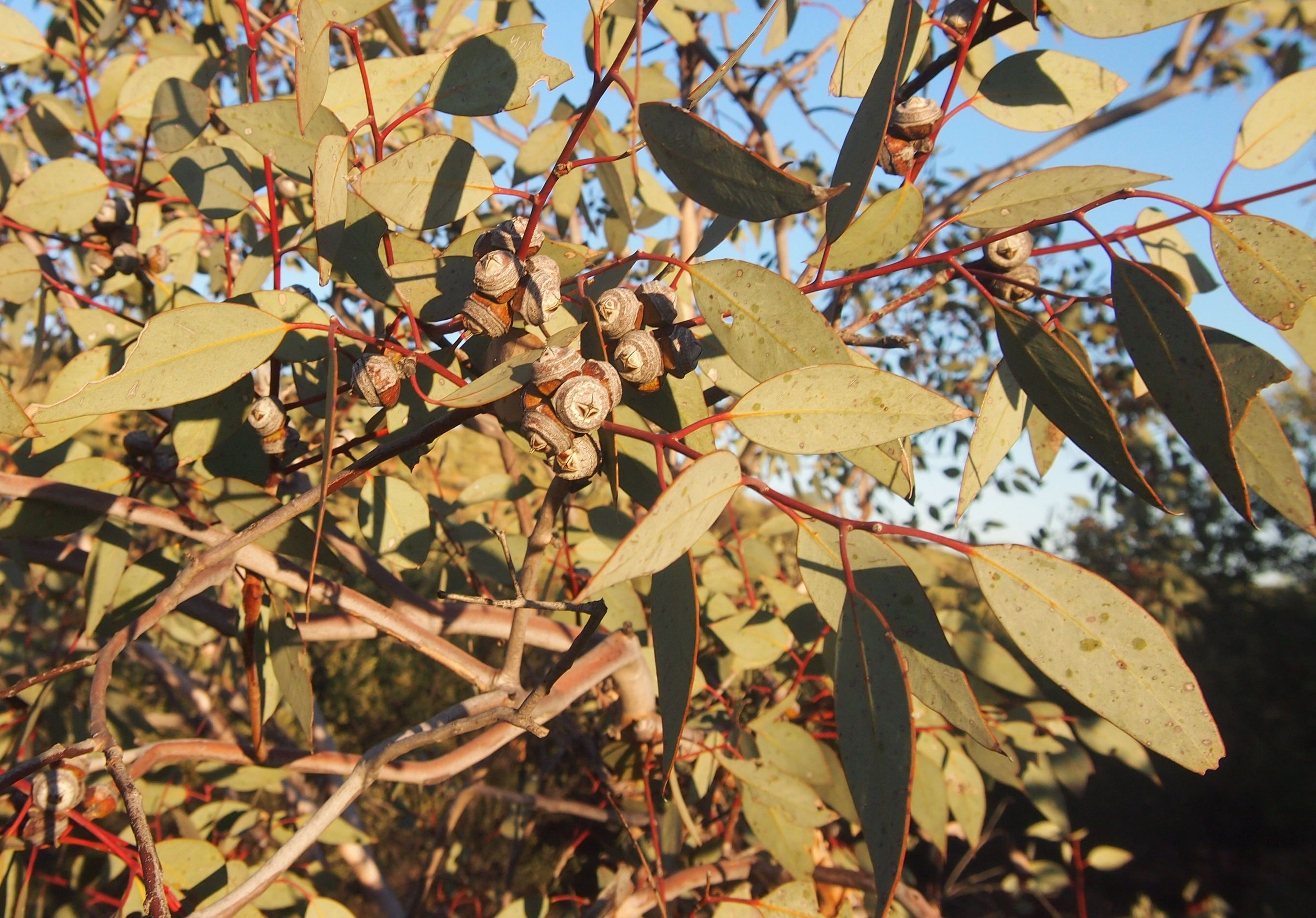
Fruit and foliage

Eucalyptus sessilis, commonly known as Finke River mallee, red bud mallee or river mallee, is a species of mallee that is native to the Northern Territory and central areas along the border of Western Australia. It has smooth bark, sometimes with ribbon of old bark near the base, lance-shaped to egg-shaped or elliptical adult leaves, flower buds in groups of seven, creamy yellow flowers and hemispherical fruit.

== Description ==
Eucalyptus sessilis is a mallee with a spreading, straggly habit, that typically grows to a height of 2–5 m (6 ft 7 in – 16 ft 5 in), and forms a lignotuber. Its bark is smooth and grey and is shed in long strips or ribbons that sometimes accumulate at the base of the stems. Young plants and coppice regrowth have egg-shaped to broadly lance-shaped leaves that are 120–160 mm (4.7–6.3 in) long and 50–60 mm (2.0–2.4 in) wide. Adult leaves are arranged alternately, the same dull and green to grey-green colour on both sides, 60–150 mm (2.4–5.9 in) long and 17–62 mm (0.67–2.44 in) wide on a petiole 17–42 mm (0.67–1.65 in) long. The flower buds are arranged in leaf axils in groups of seven on a stout, unbranched peduncle 4–10 mm (0.16–0.39 in) long, the individual buds sessile or on pedicels up to 4 mm (0.16 in) long. Mature buds are claret-coloured, oval to spherical, 18–25 mm (0.71–0.98 in) long and 10–16 mm (0.39–0.63 in) wide, with longitudinal ribs and a beaked operculum. Flowering occurs between April and July and the flowers are yellow-cream in colour. The fruit is a woody, usually sessile, hemispherical capsule 6–13 mm (0.24–0.51 in) long and 14–23 mm (0.55–0.91 in) wide with a raised disc and four protruding valves. The seeds are grey-brown to blackish, 2–4 mm (0.079–0.157 in) long and a flattened pyramid to cubic shape.

== Taxonomy ==
Finke River mallee was first formally described in 1920 by the botanist Joseph Maiden as Eucalyptus pachyphylla var. sessilis in his book A Critical Revision of the Genus Eucalyptus. The type specimen was collected by Ernest Giles in 1872 at Glen of Palms in the western Macdonnell Range, to the south of Hermannsburg In 1934, William Blakely raised the subspecies to species status as E. sessilis in his book A Key to the Eucalypts. A common name for this tree is the Finke River (or River) mallee. The specific epithet (sessilis) refers to the sessile buds and fruit.

== Distribution and habitat ==
Eucalyptus sessilis grows in open shrubland on stony slopes. It is found in the central Northern Territory in an area centred around Alice Springs with a scattered distribution that extends west over the Western Australian border into the Goldfields-Esperance region. It is most often found on rocky ranges particularly the MacDonnell Ranges and Central Ranges in the Northern Territory and the Rawlinson Ranges and Walter James Range in Western Australia. It is also scattered through the Finke River basin, Great Sandy Desert and Burt Plains.

== Conservation status ==
This mallee is classified as "least concern" under the Northern Territory Government Territory Parks and Wildlife Conservation Act 1976 and as "not threatened" by the Western Australian Government Department of Parks and Wildlife.

== Use in horticulture ==
It is both drought and frost resistant, attracts birds and grows well in full sun or part shade.

== See also ==
- List of Eucalyptus species
