= Richard B. Smith =

Richard B. Smith may refer to:

- Richard Bowyer Smith (1837–1919), Australian inventor
- Richard B. Smith (New York politician) (1878–1937)
- Richard Bernhard Smith (1901–1935), American composer
- Richard Baird Smith (1818–1861), British military engineer
