= Corymbia pachycarpa =

Scientific classification
- Kingdom: Plantae
- Clade: Embryophytes
- Clade: Tracheophytes
- Clade: Spermatophytes
- Clade: Angiosperms
- Clade: Eudicots
- Clade: Rosids
- Order: Myrtales
- Family: Myrtaceae
- Genus: Corymbia
- Species: C. pachycarpa

Binomial name
- Corymbia pachycarpa K.D.Hill & L.A.S.Johnson

Synonyms
- Corymbia pachycarpa subsp. glabrescens K.D.Hill & L.A.S.Johnson; Corymbia pachycarpa K.D.Hill & L.A.S.Johnson subsp. pachycarpa; Eucalyptus pachycarpa (K.D.Hill & L.A.S.Johnson) Brooker

Species of plant

Corymbia pachycarpa, commonly known as urn-fruited bloodwood, mawurru, yilanggi or warlamarn, is a species of stunted tree or mallee that is endemic to northern Australia. It has thick, tessellated bark on the trunk and branches, a crown of heart-shaped, egg-shaped or lance-shaped leaves, flower buds in groups of three or seven, white flowers and urn-shaped to barrel-shaped fruit.

== Description ==
Corymbia pachycarpa is a stunted tree or mallee that typically grows to a height of 6 m (20 ft) and forms a lignotuber. It has rough, brownish tessellated and fissured bark on the trunk and branches. The crown of the tree has sessile, heart-shaped, egg-shaped or lance-shaped leaves that are the same shade of light green on both sides, 40–120 mm (1.6–4.7 in) long and 17–50 mm (0.67–1.97 in) wide and arranged in opposite pairs. The flower buds are mostly arranged on the ends of branchlets on a branched peduncle 10–3 mm (0.39–0.12 in) long, each branch of the peduncle with three or seven buds on pedicels 7–20 mm (0.28–0.79 in) long. Mature buds are pear-shaped, 15–26 mm (0.59–1.02 in) long and 8–10 mm (0.31–0.39 in) wide with a prominently beaked operculum. Flowering has been observed in December and the flowers are white. The fruit is a woody urn-shaped to barrel-shaped capsule 23–38 mm (0.91–1.50 in) long and 25–33 mm (0.98–1.30 in) wide with an obvious, but not flared neck, and the valves enclosed in the fruit.

== Taxonomy and naming ==
Corymbia pachycarpa was first formally in 1995 by Ken Hill and Lawrie Johnson. The Jaru peoples know the tree as mawurru, yilanggi or warlamarn. The specific epithet (pachycarpa) is from the Greek pachys meaning "thick" and karpos, latinised as carpus, "a fruit", referring to the large, thick-walled fruit.

== Distribution and habitat ==
This eucalypt grows in arid part of northern Western Australia and adjacent parts of the Northern Territory. Its range extends from the Great Sandy Desert to near Western Australia and east through the fringes of the Tanami Desert to Wave Hill Station in the Northern Territory.

== See also ==
- List of Corymbia species
