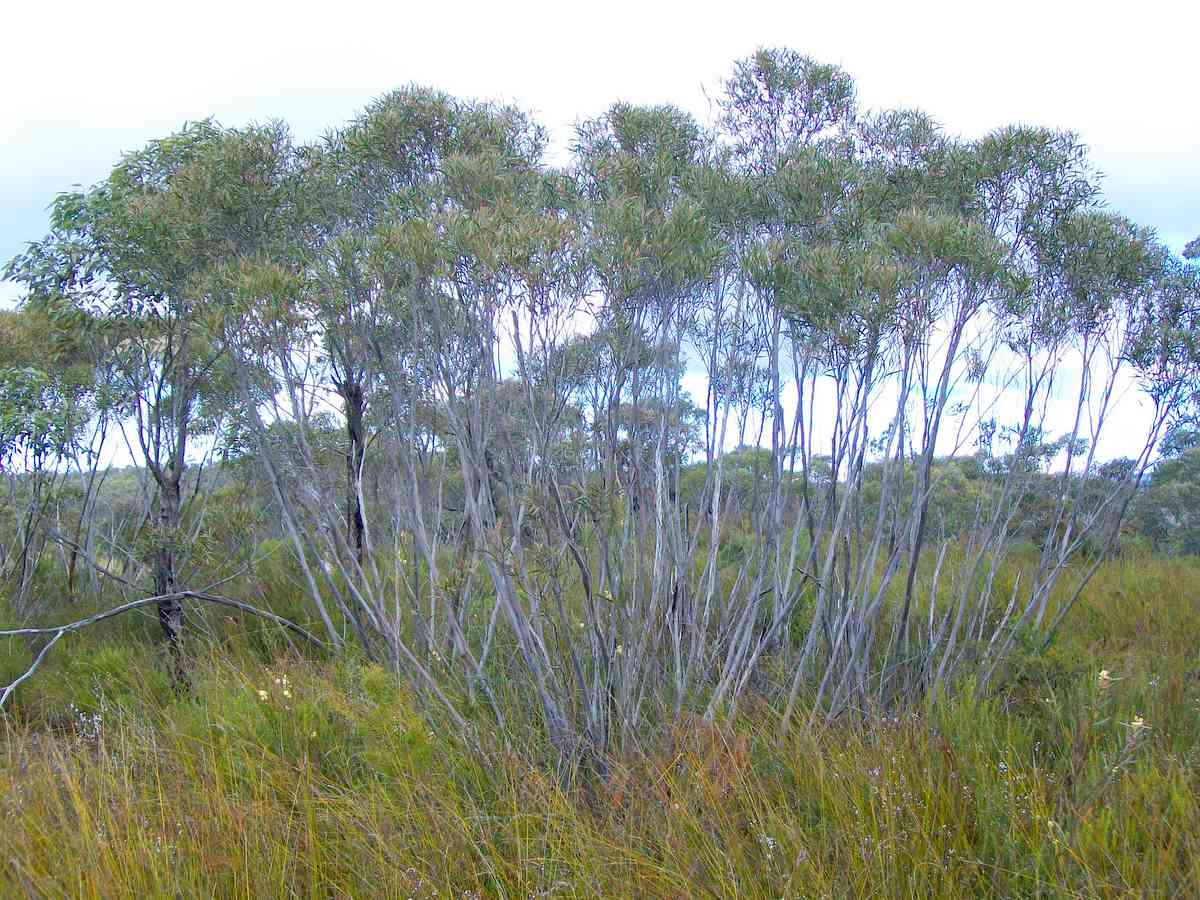
- Blue Mountains mallee ash at Woodford

Scientific classification
- Kingdom: Plantae
- Clade: Embryophytes
- Clade: Tracheophytes
- Clade: Spermatophytes
- Clade: Angiosperms
- Clade: Eudicots
- Clade: Rosids
- Order: Myrtales
- Family: Myrtaceae
- Genus: Eucalyptus
- Species: E. stricta

Binomial name
- Eucalyptus stricta Sieber ex Spreng.

Synonyms
- synonyms: Eucalyptus spectatrix L.A.S.Johnson & Blaxell; Eucalyptus stricta Sieber ex Spreng. var. stricta; Eucalyptus stricta var. subcampanulata Blakely; Eucalyptus virgata var. stricta (Sieber ex Spreng.) Maiden

= Eucalyptus stricta =

Blue Mountains mallee ash

Species of eucalyptus

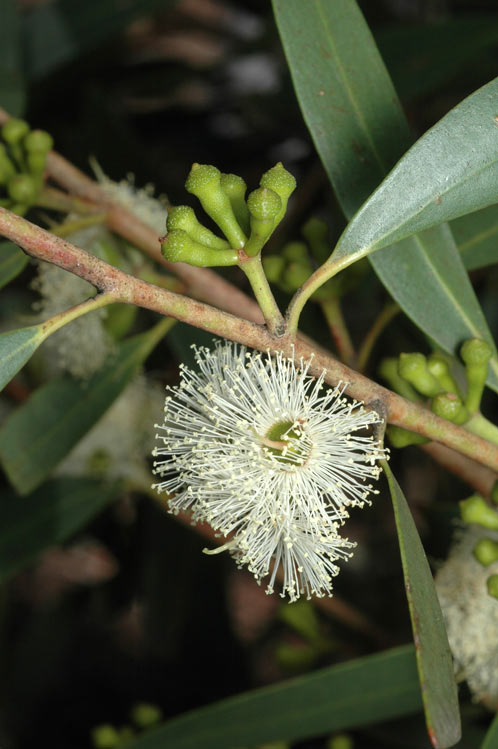
Flower buds and flowers

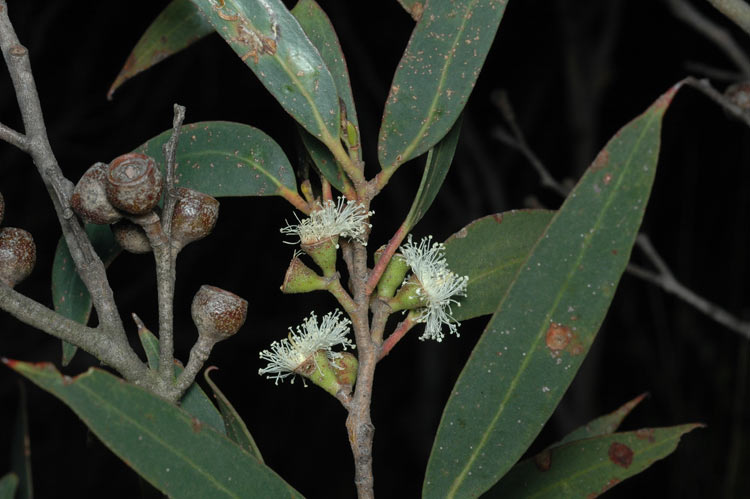
Fruit

Eucalyptus stricta, commonly known as Blue Mountains mallee ash, is a mallee that is endemic to eastern New South Wales. It has smooth, mottled bark, often with insect scribbles, linear to lance-shaped adult leaves, flower buds in groups of seven, white flowers and urn-shaped to barrel-shaped fruit.

== Description ==
Eucalyptus stricta is a mallee that typically grows to a height of 5–7 m (16–23 ft) and forms a lignotuber. It has smooth, mottled pale grey brown and pink bark, often with insect scribbles. Young plants and coppice regrowth have glossy green, lance-shaped leaves that are 70–140 mm (2.8–5.5 in) long and 15–35 mm (0.59–1.38 in) wide. Adult leaves are the same shade of glossy green on both sides, linear to lance-shaped, 60–110 mm (2.4–4.3 in) long and 6–16 mm (0.24–0.63 in) wide, the base tapering to a petiole 5–17 mm (0.20–0.67 in) long. The flower buds are arranged in leaf axils in groups of seven on an unbranched peduncle 5–13 mm (0.20–0.51 in) long, the individual buds on pedicels 2–7 mm (0.079–0.276 in) long. Mature buds are oval to pear-shaped, 6–9 mm (0.24–0.35 in) long and 4–5 mm (0.16–0.20 in) wide with a conical to rounded operculum. Flowering has been observed in most months and the flowers are white. The fruit is a woody urn-shaped to barrel-shaped capsule 6–10 mm (0.24–0.39 in) long and 6–11 mm (0.24–0.43 in) wide with the valves near rim level or below it.

== Taxonomy and naming ==
Eucalyptus stricta was first formally described in 1827 by Kurt Polycarp Joachim Sprengel from an unpublished description by Franz Sieber. Sprengel's description was published in his book Systema Vegetabilium. The specific epithet (stricta) is from the Latin strictus meaning"drawn together", "upright" or "straight", possibly referring to the many stems of this mallee.

== Distribution and habitat ==
Blue Mountains mallee ash has a scattered distribution from the Central Coast and through the Blue Mountains to the Budawangs and is locally common. It grows in heath and shrubland in shallow, sandy soils on plateaus and ridge-tops.
