= Xylopodium =

A xylopodium is an underground storage growth which is multibranched and may cover a circle 9 metres (30 ft) diameter. They differ from lignotubers which are more compact in form, like a tuber. They are most common in the cerrados of Brazil even including a monocot (Smilax goyazana), but the mallee roots of Australia are more like xylopodia than lignotubers.
