= Hann Range =

Mountain range in Australia

Coordinates: 22°47′46″S 133°24′48″E

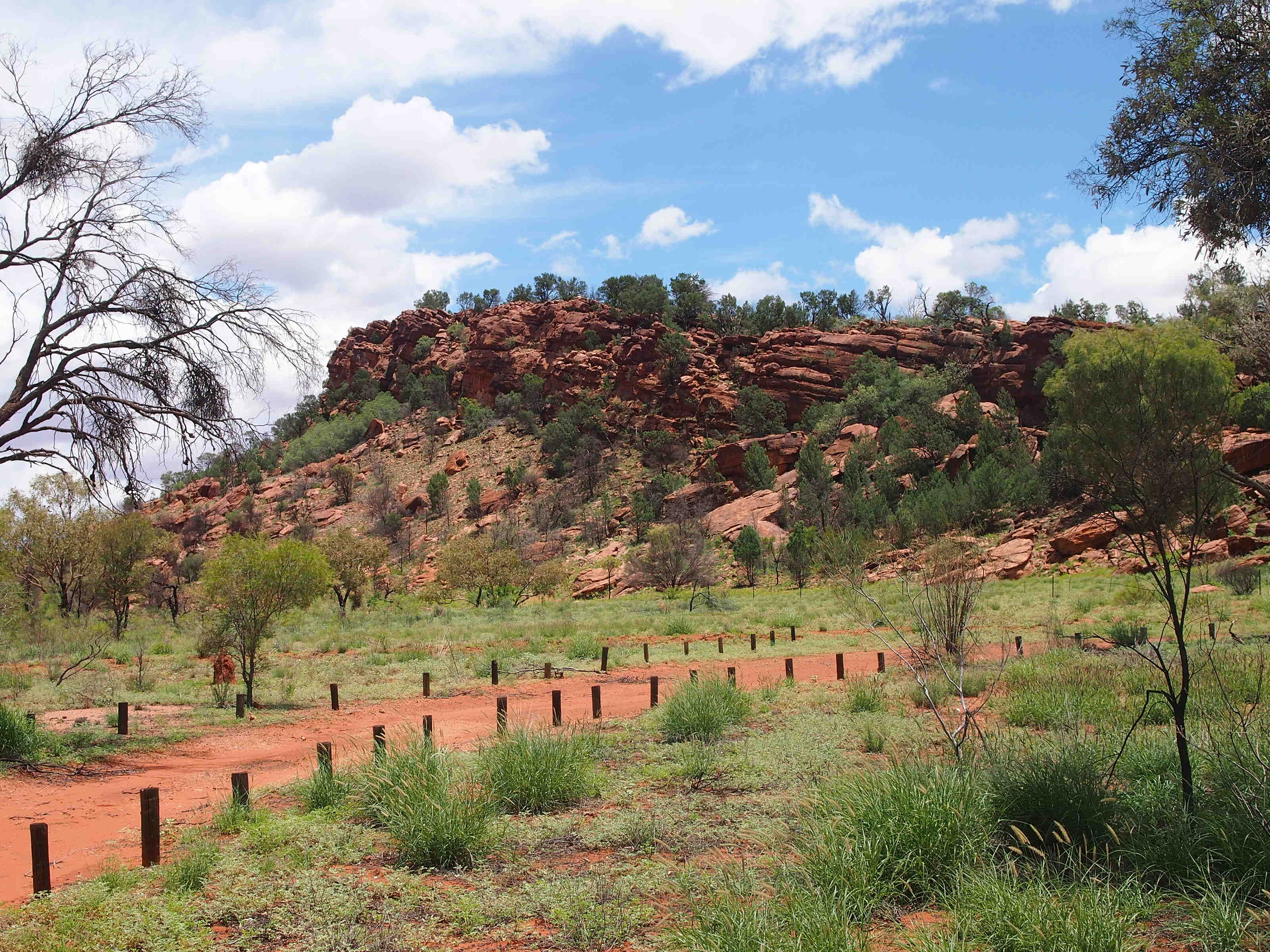
Native Gap in the Hann Range

Hann Range is a mountain range in the Northern Territory of Australia, in central Australia approximately 120 kilometres (75 mi) north of Alice Springs.

The range stretches east to west for a distance of approximately 40 kilometres (25 mi); it is surrounded by the Burt Plain. The highest point of the Hann Range is Mount Evatt with an elevation of 802 metres (2,631 ft). The Stuart Highway bisects the range not far from Mount Evatt.

The range is situated in the Ngalia Basin at the south and eastern end. The area is composed of a well defined ridge of silicified brown sandstone overlaying the basement rock. The ridge is made up of outcropping Vaughan Springs Quartzite of a similar age and lithology to the Heavitree Quartzite that overlooks Alice Springs. The metamorphic basement is composed of Mount Bleechmore granulite.

The traditional owners of the area are the Arrernte people, who know the area as Arwerlt Atwaty.

The Native Gap Conservation Reserve is located in the Range; the gap is a sacred site to the Arrernte and Anmatyerr peoples. The area is at the junction of many creation stories, and the name of the site in the Arrernte language is Arurlte Artwatye, where Arurlte means "the top of the shoulders across the neck" and Artwatye means "gap".

The Range is thought to have been named by John Ross while surveying a route for the Overland Telegraph Line in 1870, after the explorers and pastoralists Frank and William Hann.
