= Clarence Herbert Smith =

Australian agriculturalist, engineer, blacksmith and inventor

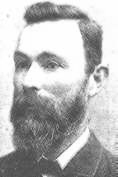
- Clarence Herbert Smith
- Born: September 10, 1855; Alma, Victoria
- Died: July 25, 1901 (aged 45); Ardrossan, South Australia
- Occupation(s): agriculturalist, engineer, blacksmith and inventor
- Known for: stump-jump plough

Clarence Herbert Smith (10 August 1855 in Alma, Victoria – 25 July 1901 in Ardrossan, South Australia) was an Australian agriculturalist, engineer, blacksmith and inventor.

He was a farmer at Kalkabury, north of Arthurton, South Australia, from around 1875.

Under the direction of his brother, Richard Bowyer Smith, C. H. Smith created the first stump-jump plough, entitled the Vixen, in 1876. The South Australian government had offered a reward of £200 to anyone who could develop an effective mechanical stump puller due to frustration with lack of productivity efficiency on its farms with current equipment.

The plough consisted of a number of hinged shares (originally three): when the blade encountered an underground obstacle, it would rise out of the ground. Attached weights forced the blade back into the ground after the root was passed, allowing as much of the ground to be furrowed as possible. Although unorthodox, it proved remarkably effective, and was dubbed the "stump-jump" plough.

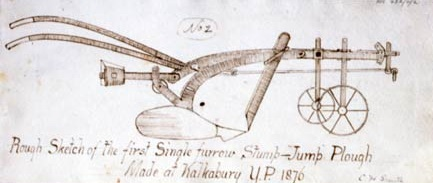
Plan of the original single-furrow plough

C. H. Smith worked on improving the plough, and demonstrated the improved model at the Moonta Agricultural Show with much success. Both the single and triple plough model were awarded first prize. R. B. Smith took out a patent in 1877 for the design, he allowed it to lapse.

C. H. Smith established a factory in Ardrossan, South Australia, in 1880, and started producing ploughs. R. B. Smith was later credited as the inventor of the design by the Parliament of South Australia in 1882, however C. H. continued manufacturing them because his brother had allowed the patent to lapse. R. B. Smith relocated to Western Australia two years later.

C. H. Smith married Emma Sarah Beck in 1879. Upon his death in 1901, C. H. Smith's business was transferred to his two sons, C. Glen Smith and Alma O. Smith, who married Eva Alderman, also of Ardrossan, on 27 August 1907.

The company, Clarence H. Smith Ltd, ceased operations in 1934, during the Great Depression.
