= Strangways Land Act =

The Waste Lands Amendment Act 1868-9, commonly known as the Strangways Land Act or Strangways Act, was enacted in January 1869 in the colony of South Australia, with the long title An Act to further amend the "Waste Lands Act". The Act enabled the purchase of land for farmers, allowing for closer settlement in areas of the province suited to more intensive agriculture, rather than vast pastoral runs on uncleared land leased from the government. It is named for Henry Strangways, who was premier and attorney-general when the legislation was passed, and had previously been the Minister for Crown Lands.

It followed the Scrub Lands Act 1866, which enabled long-term leases of crown land between farmers and the government for the first time, but with the proviso that the farmer would clear a certain proportion of the land each year.

== Background ==
Land had been surveyed and sold for farming in the more temperate climate areas of the province, and nearer to Adelaide, with the much larger expanses retained as crown land. Squatters had established pastoral runs in this crown land. A system of crown leases was established to provide some level of tenure to the pastoralists and income to the government from these lands. The parliament gained responsibility for these crown lands in 1857. Several attempts had been made for land legislation after 1857. A Select Committee on the Sale of Crown Lands was chaired by C. H. Goode in 1865; however its report was of marginal value.

By the mid-1860s dense mallee scrub still covered several large tracts of land, and the South Australian Parliament passed the Scrub Lands Act 1866, intended to encourage settlers on the land. By this act, blocks of up to a square mile were offered on 21-year lease in these areas. Annual rental was determined by bids at an auction. The lessee was required to clear five per cent of the land annually for the following 20 years, or until all arable land had been cleared. The lessee was then allowed to purchase the leased land at a minimum cost of £1 per acre.

The Scrub Lands Act was not a great success, because hand-clearing the mallee was very difficult. However it did create for the first time a different relationship between Government and farmer: while annual licences to cultivate land were not new, the long-term landlord/tenant relationship, the opportunity to purchase by deferred payment, and the government control over the use that farmers made of the land, were new to the colony.

== Description ==
Strangways introduced a bill in 1868 which was eventually passed in January 1869, despite conflict with pastoralists, as An Act to further amend the "Waste Lands Act", and thereafter commonly known as the Strangways Act, Strangways Land Act. It was given the formal short title Waste Lands Amendment Act 1868-9 by section 26 of the act. There was an increasing demand for more land to be available for farmers to clear of scrub for the purpose of more intensive agriculture such as growing grain crops and mixed farming. The legislation provided for the creation of agricultural areas and sale of crown land on credit.

The Act allowed a person to purchase up to 640 acres (260 ha), with a payment of 20 per cent at the fall of the hammer at auction, regarded as payment in advance of the interest on the purchase money, the whole amount to be paid four years later. There were regulations to ensure that purchasers farmed the land themselves. An amendment in January 1871 reduced the required initial payment from 20 per cent to 10 per cent, with a further 10 per cent to be paid three years later. In August 1872, another act changed the time for payment of the purchase money to three years after the payment of the second 10 per cent (six years after the purchase), and by paying only half the purchase money at this time the purchaser could obtain an extension of up to four more years.

== Consequences ==
According to historian Bill Gammage, the credit agreements led to "bitter struggles between large and small holders for control of the land, and after 1869 parliament intervened many times to break up large holdings in support of closer settlement". Various legislation included the closer settlement Acts of the 1880s, soldier settlement schemes after the world wars, and rural assistance schemes in the mid-20th century.

However large areas of South Australia were not suited for smaller landholdings and closer settlements; droughts and poor seasons could lead to ruin of the farmers where land blocks were too small. Those who could afford it, bought neighbours' properties. Over the following century, legislation progressively lessened the conditions and restrictions which brought about closer settlement.

The invention of the stump jump plough in 1876 has been attributed to the difficulties encountered by the farmers having to clear the mallee under both of these acts.
