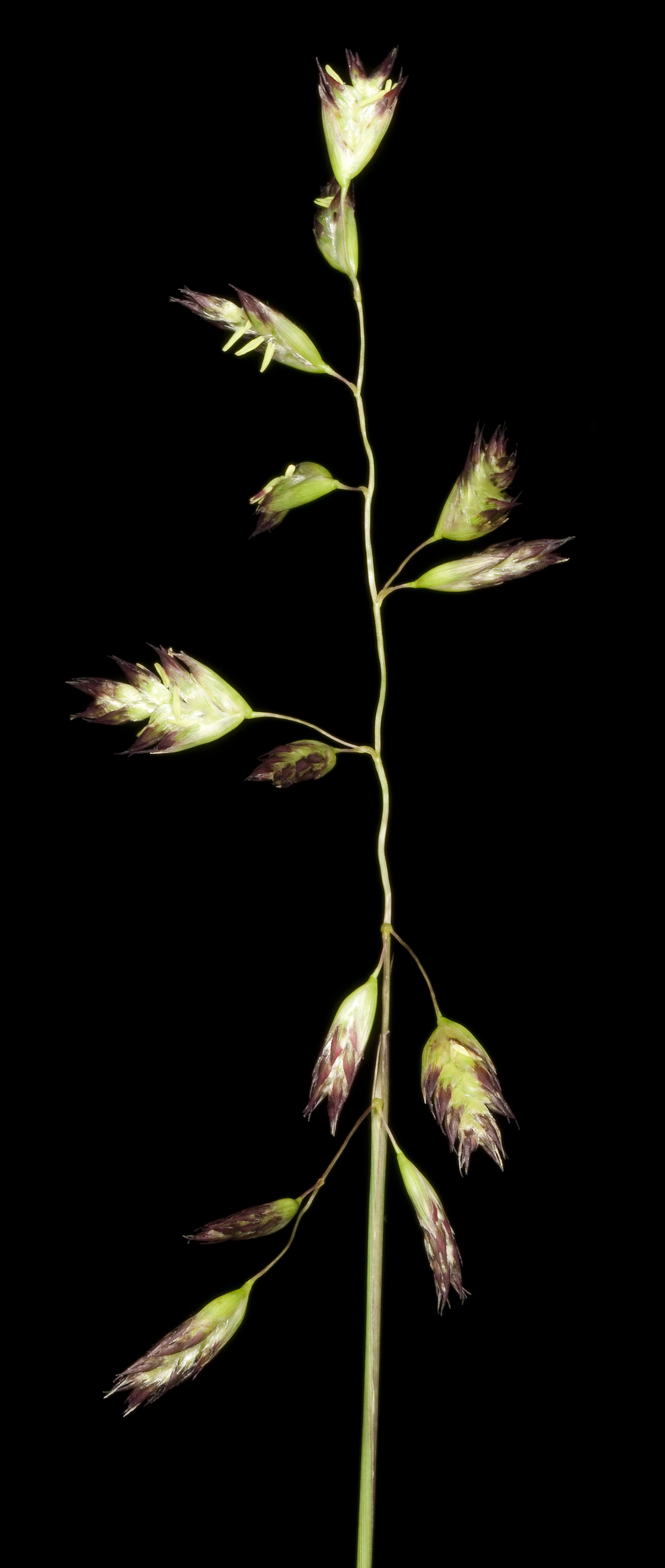

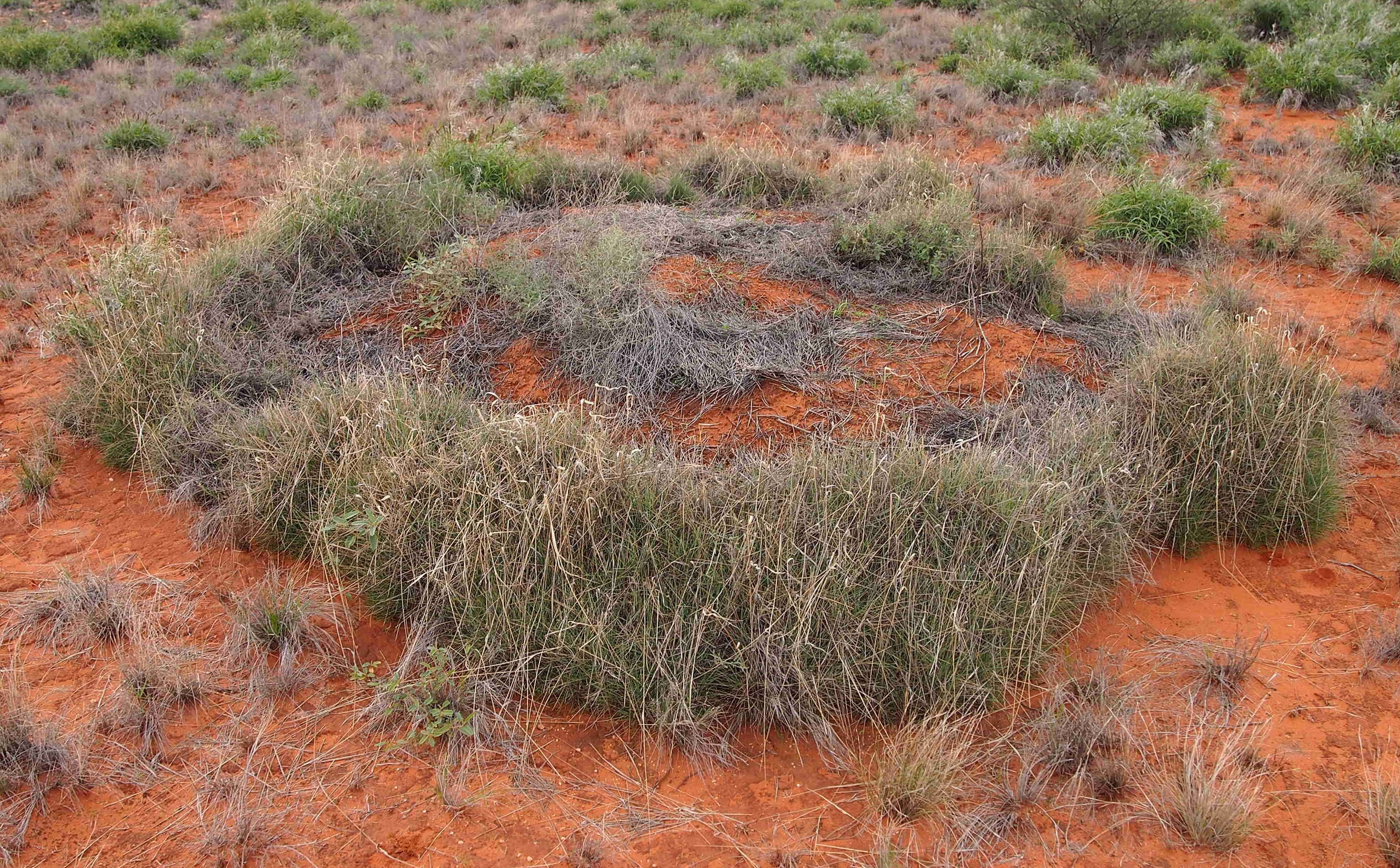

Scientific classification
- Kingdom: Plantae
- Clade: Embryophytes
- Clade: Tracheophytes
- Clade: Spermatophytes
- Clade: Angiosperms
- Clade: Monocots
- Clade: Commelinids
- Order: Poales
- Family: Poaceae
- Subfamily: Chloridoideae
- Genus: Triodia
- Species: T. basedowii

Binomial name
- Triodia basedowii E.Pritz.

= Triodia basedowii =

Species of plant

Triodia basedowii, commonly known as lobed spinifex, is a species of tussock-forming grass-like plant found in Australia.

It occurs on sandy plains and small hills and dunes of bare red sand. Green to purple flowers are displayed from long scapes at any time of the year, emerging from the short and dense foliage growing no more than 1.3 meters high.

The associated landscape which it dominates is sometimes favoured as habitat of a pebble mound building mouse species Pseudomys chapmani.

It was first described in 1918 by Ernst Georg Pritzel.

== Distribution and habitat ==
It occurs from the coast of Western Australia to central Queensland, in the far north-west of New South Wales, in the Northern Territory and in South Australia, where it is found on flat or slightly sloping sites in deep reddish sands or sandy loams, but also together with limestone or on skeletal soils on quartzite on the edges of salt lakes.
