= Richard Bowyer Smith =

Australian engineer

- Born: 2 September 1837; London, England
- Died: 4 February 1919 (aged 81); Subiaco, Western Australia
- Resting place: Karrakatta Cemetery
- Spouse: Margaret Hunter Smith (nee Smith) (1843–1915)
- Parent(s): Smith Owen Smith (1807–1890) and Mary Ann Smith (nee Lee)

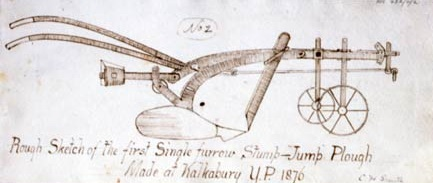
Plan of the original single-furrow plough.

Richard Bowyer Smith (2 September 1837 in London, England – 4 February 1919 in Subiaco, Western Australia) was an Australian inventor.

== Career ==
Smith migrated from London to South Australia with his parents Owen and Mary Ann Smith (née Lee), arriving on 15 May 1838.

He is reported to have served an apprenticeship as a wheelwright with J. G. Ramsay & Co. of Strathalbyn, South Australia.

Under Smith's direction, his brother Clarence Herbert Smith created the first stump-jump plough, entitled the Vixen, in 1876. The South Australian government had offered a reward of £200 to anyone who could develop an effective mechanical stump puller, due to the difficulties farmers encountered on newly cleared land.

The plough consisted of a number (originally three) of hinged shares: when any blade encountered an underground obstacle, it would rise out of the ground. Attached weights forced the blade back into the ground after the root was passed, allowing as much of the ground to be furrowed as possible. Although a little unorthodox, it proved remarkably effective, and was dubbed the "stump-jump" plough.

Smith took out a patent in 1877 for the design, but allowed it to lapse, though one report has him selling the patent rights to Mellor Brothers. R. B. Smith was later credited as the inventor of the design by the Parliament of South Australia in 1882, despite controversy over the claim, and was awarded £500. He relocated to Western Australia in 1884, where he demonstrated and marketed the plough with little sales success and minimal profits. His brother made parts for the plough in South Australia.

R. B., dubbed "Stump Jump" Smith, was manager of the Freemasons Hotel in Beverley, Western Australia from 1893 to 1895, and the Railway Refreshment Rooms between 1895 and 1899. He then leased 181.5 acres (0.735 km^{2}) of farmland at Beverley, where he resumed his passion for creating agricultural tools. He opened a workshop in the Perth suburb of Highgate in 1912, having relinquished his lease of the land.
