= Grubbing =

Removal of foliage and rubbish from site

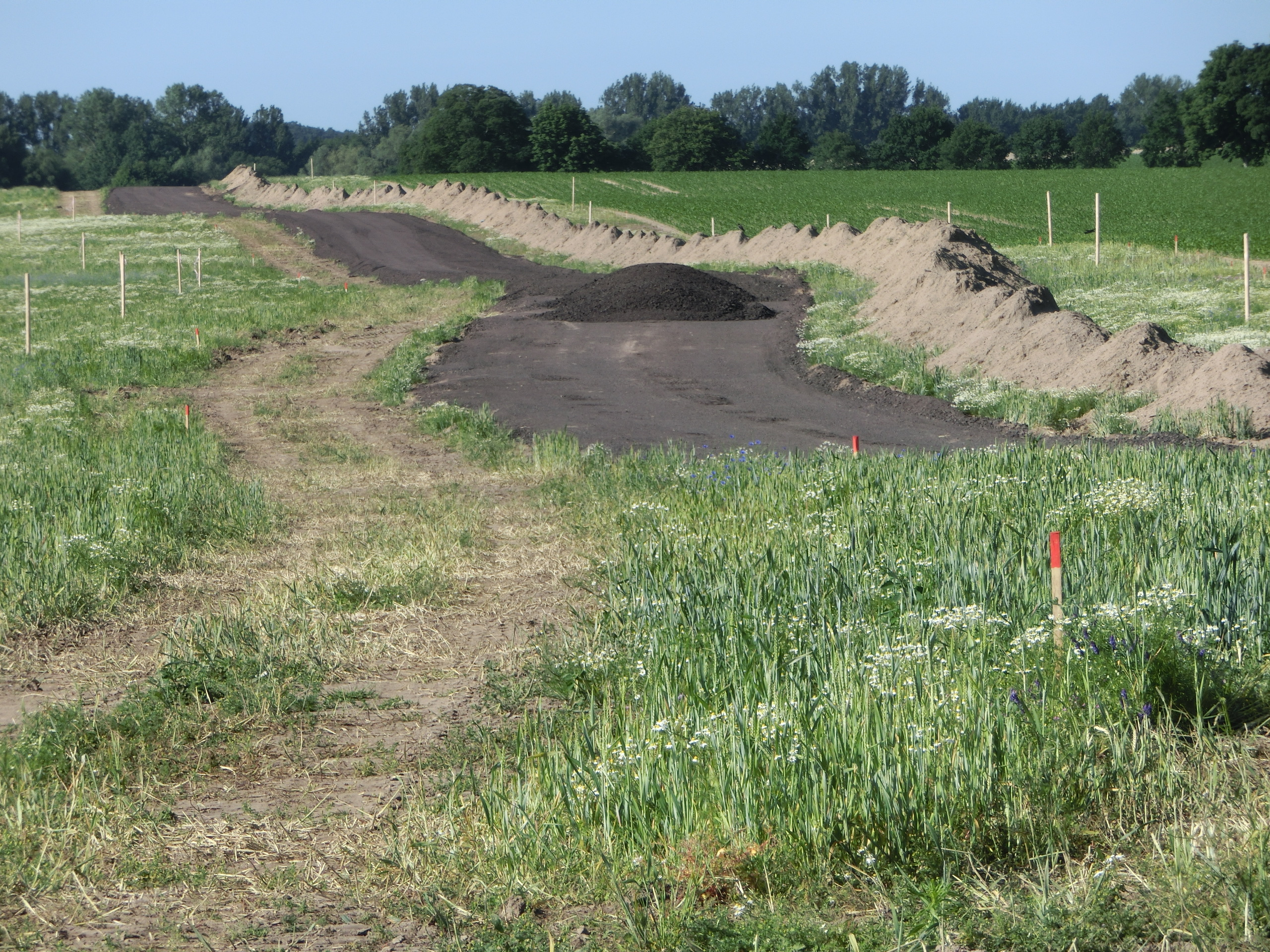
Grubbed road with first layer of aggregate being applied

Grubbing or clearing is the removal of trees, shrubs, stumps and rubbish from a site. This is often performed to prepare a construction site for, e.g., transportation or utility corridors; roads or power lines; or edifices and gardens. Grubbing is performed following clearance of trees to their stumps, preceding construction.

In animal behaviour, grubbing is a feeding technique, referring to digging and uprooting of roots and rhizomes of plants. It is employed by geese, especially greater and lesser snow geese and Canada geese, as well as swine.
