= Lignotuber =

Swelling of the root which protects against fire and other hazards

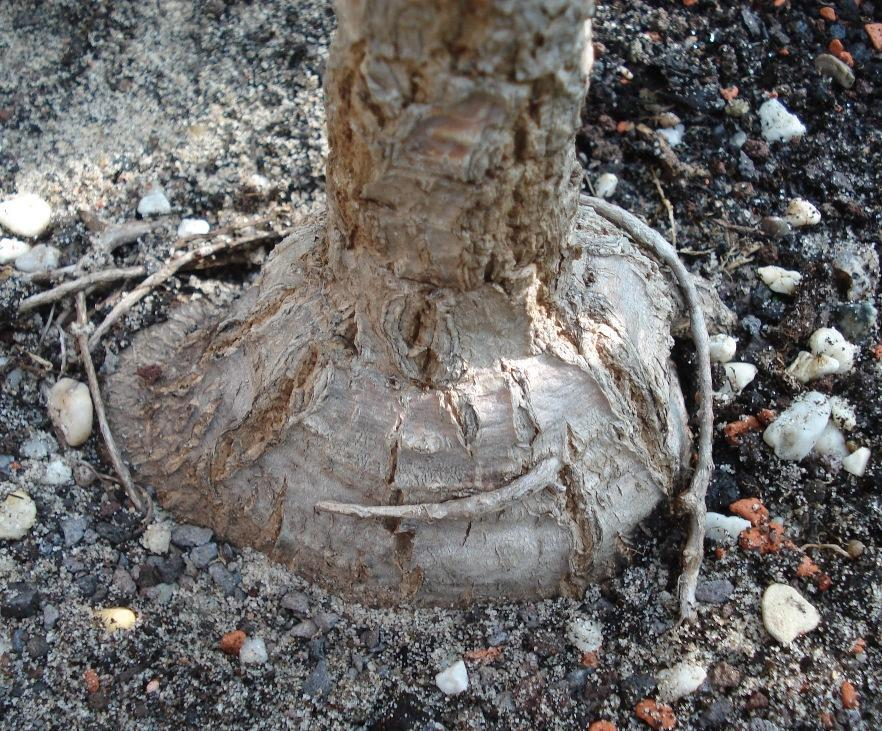
Lignotuber of Cussonia paniculata partly exposed above ground

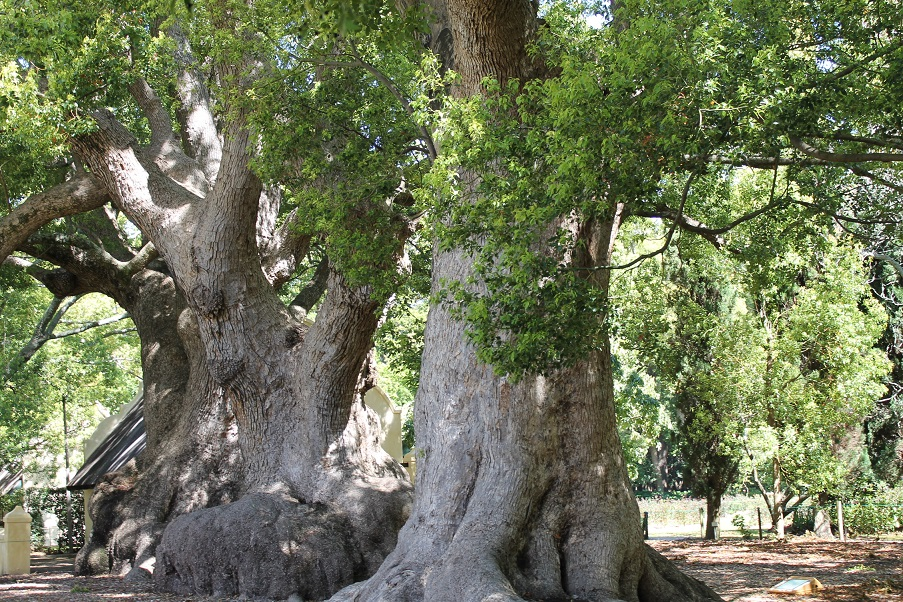
Camphor trees at the Vergelegen Estate

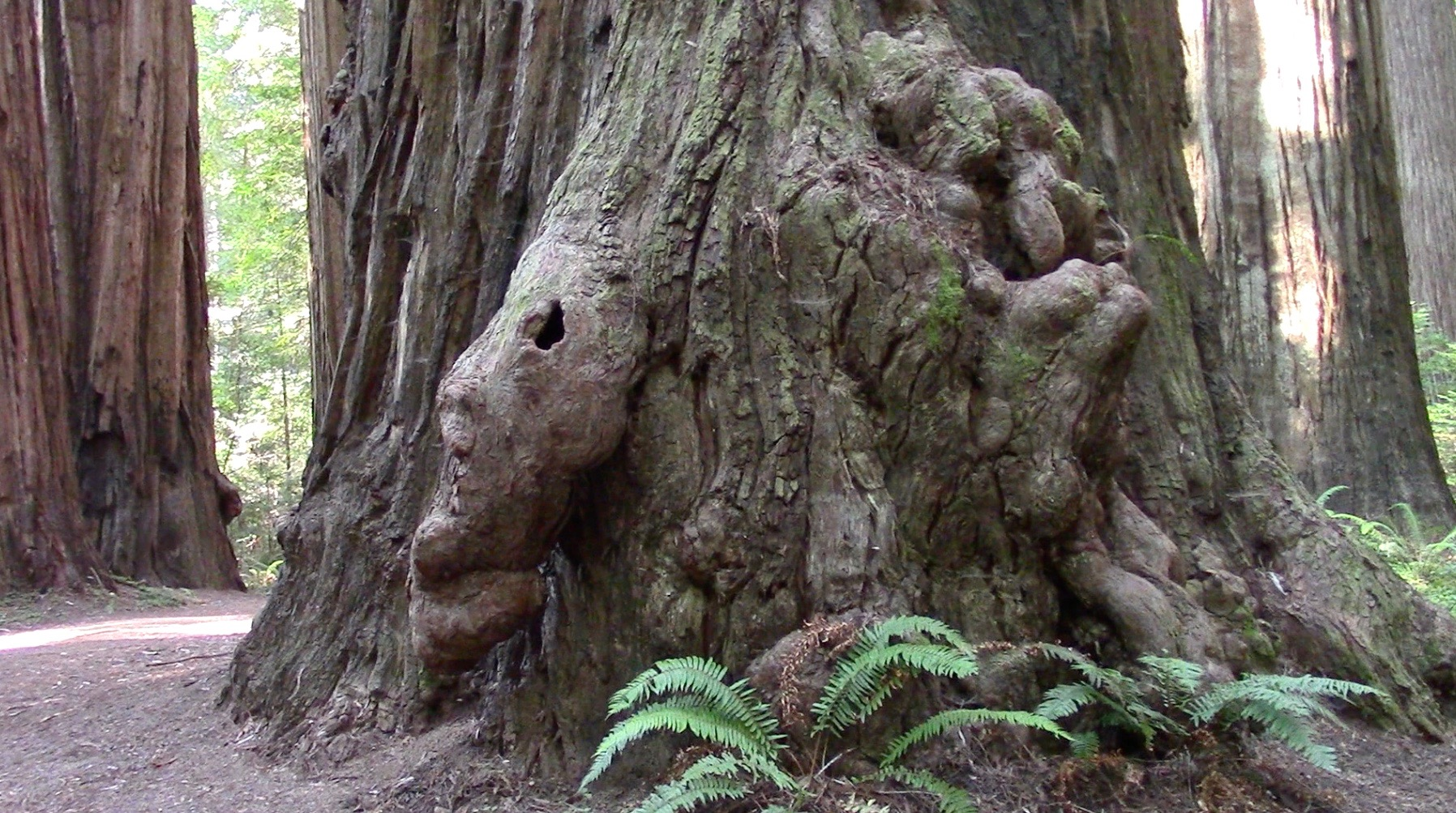
Lignotuber at the Roosevelt Grove of Humboldt Redwoods State Park

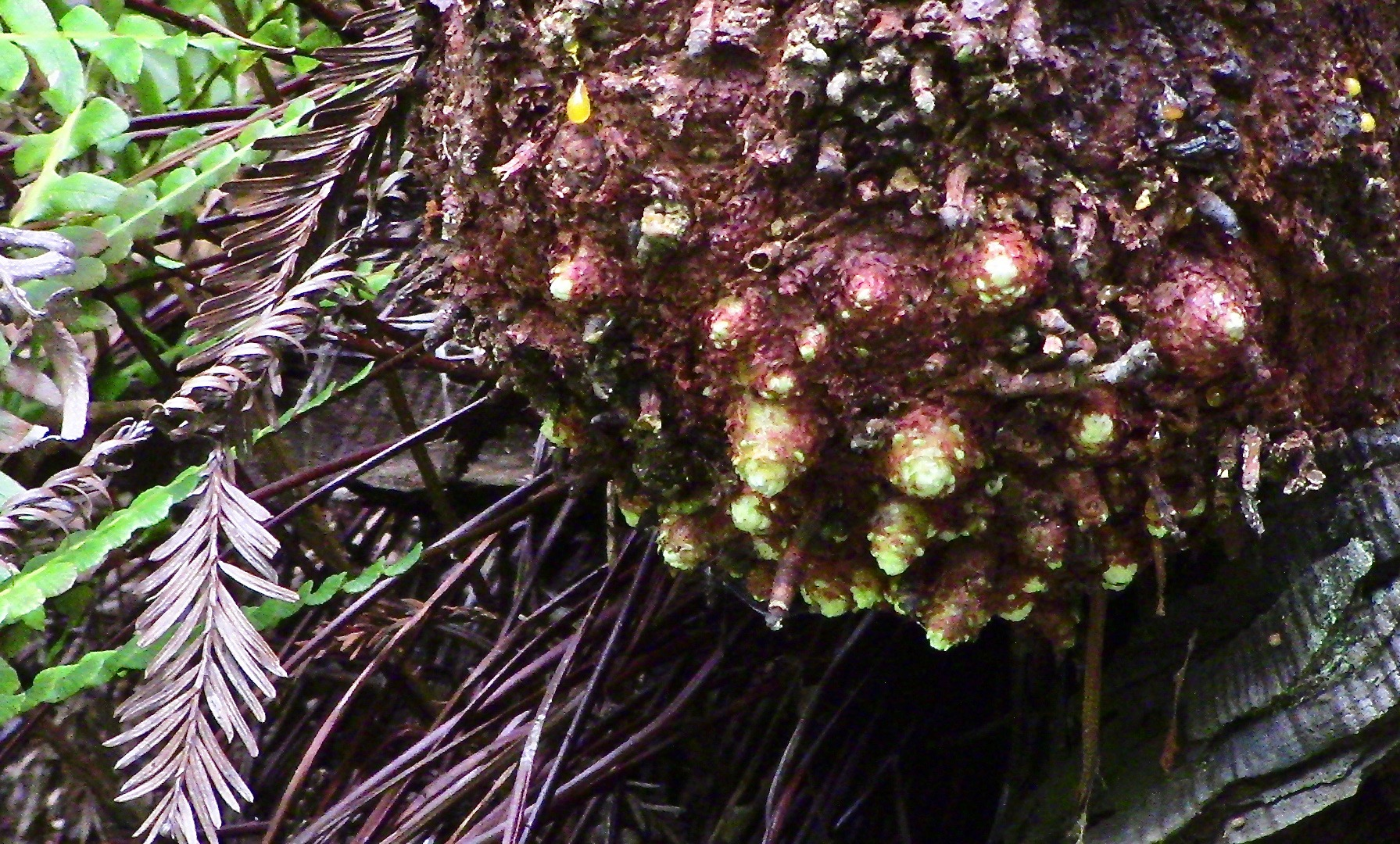
Lignotuber actively budding, Prairie Creek Redwoods State Park

A lignotuber is a woody swelling of the root crown possessed by some plants as a protection against destruction of the plant stem, such as by fire. Other woody plants may develop basal burls as a similar survival strategy, often as a response to coppicing or other environmental stressors. However, lignotubers are specifically part of the normal course of development of the plants that possess them, and often develop early on in growth. The crown contains buds from which new stems may sprout, as well as stores of starch that can support a period of growth in the absence of photosynthesis. The term "lignotuber" was coined in 1924 by Australian botanist Leslie R. Kerr.

Plants possessing lignotubers include many species in Australia; Eucalyptus marginata (jarrah), Eucalyptus brevifolia (snappy gum) and Eucalyptus ficifolia (scarlet gum) all of which can have lignotubers 3 m (10 ft) wide and 1 m (3 ft) deep, as well as most mallees (where it is also known as a mallee root) and many Banksia species.

Plants possessing lignotubers on the western coast of the US include California buckeye, coast redwood, California bay laurel (aka Oregon myrtle), and multiple species of manzanita and Ceanothus.

At least 14 species in the Mediterranean region have been identified as having lignotubers (as of 1993). Lignotubers develop from the cotyledonary bud in seedlings of several oak species including cork oak Quercus suber, but do not develop in several other oak species, and are not apparent in mature cork oak trees.

The fire-resistant lignotubers of Erica arborea, known as "briar root", are commonly used to make smoking pipes.

The largest known lignotubers (also called "root collar burls") are those of the coast redwood (Sequoia sempervirens) of central and northern California and extreme southwestern Oregon. A lignotuber washed into Big Lagoon, California, by the full gale storm of 1977 was 12 m (41 ft) in diameter and about half as tall and estimated to weigh 476 t (525 short tons). The largest dicot lignotubers are those of the Chinese camphor tree, or kusu (Cinnamomum camphora) of Japan, China and the Koreas. Ones at the Vergelegen Estate in Cape Town, South Africa, which were planted in the late 1600s, have muffin-shaped lignotubers up to two metres (7 ft) high and about 9 m (30 ft) in diameter. Perhaps the largest lignotuber in Australia would be that of "Old Bottle Butt", a red bloodwood tree (Corymbia gummifera) near Wauchope, New South Wales, that has a lignotuber about 2.5 m (8 ft 2 in) in height and 16.3 m (53 ft) in circumference at breast height. A lignotuber should not be confused with a xylopodium. Lignotubers are compact, even round. A xylopodium is diffuse and are sometimes called "underground trees".

Many plants with lignotubers grow in a shrubby habit, but with multiple stems arising from the lignotuber. The term lignotuberous shrub is used to describe this habit.

== See also ==
- California chaparral and woodlands
- Chaparral
- Crown sprouting
- Epicormic shoot, also fire-induced buds
- Fire ecology
- Geoxyle
- Resprouter
