= List of mammals of Vietnam =

This is a list of the mammal species of Vietnam. There are at least 290 mammal species in the country.

The following tags are used to highlight each species' conservation status as assessed on the respective IUCN Red List:

EX	Extinct	No reasonable doubt that the last individual has died.
EW	Extinct in the wild	Known only to survive in captivity or as a naturalized populations well outside its previous range.
CR	Critically endangered	The species is in imminent risk of extinction in the wild.
EN	Endangered	The species is facing an extremely high risk of extinction in the wild.
VU	Vulnerable	The species is facing a high risk of extinction in the wild.
NT	Near threatened	The species does not meet any of the criteria that would categorise it as risking extinction but it is likely to do so in the future.
LC	Least concern	There are no current identifiable risks to the species.
DD	Data deficient	There is inadequate information to make an assessment of the risks to this species.

== Order: Proboscidea (elephants) ==
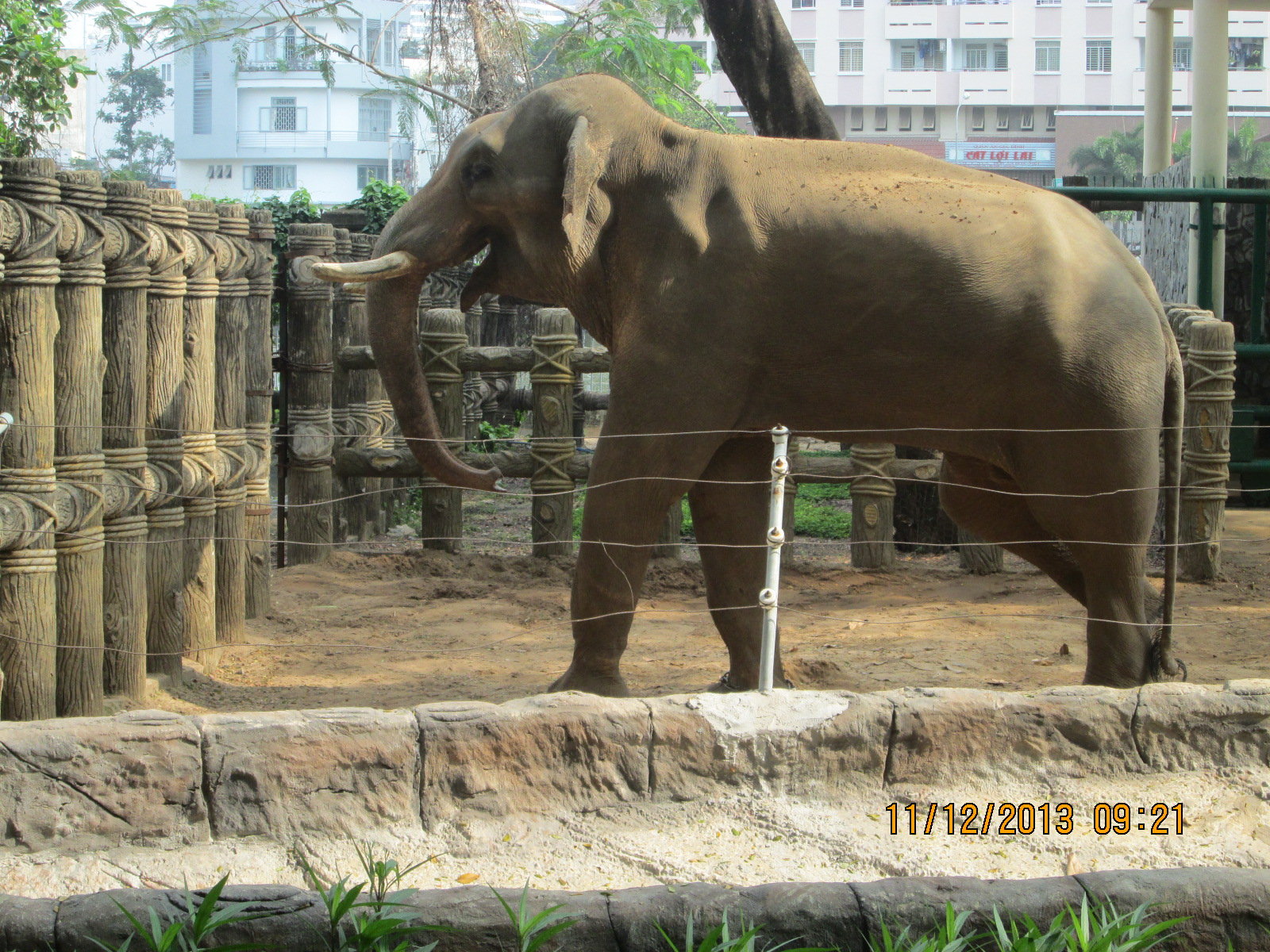
Asian elephant

The elephants comprise three living species and are the largest living land animals.

- Family: Elephantidae (elephants)
  - Genus: Elephas
    - Asian elephant, E. maximus EN
      - Indian elephant, E. m. indicus

== Order: Sirenia (manatees and dugongs) ==
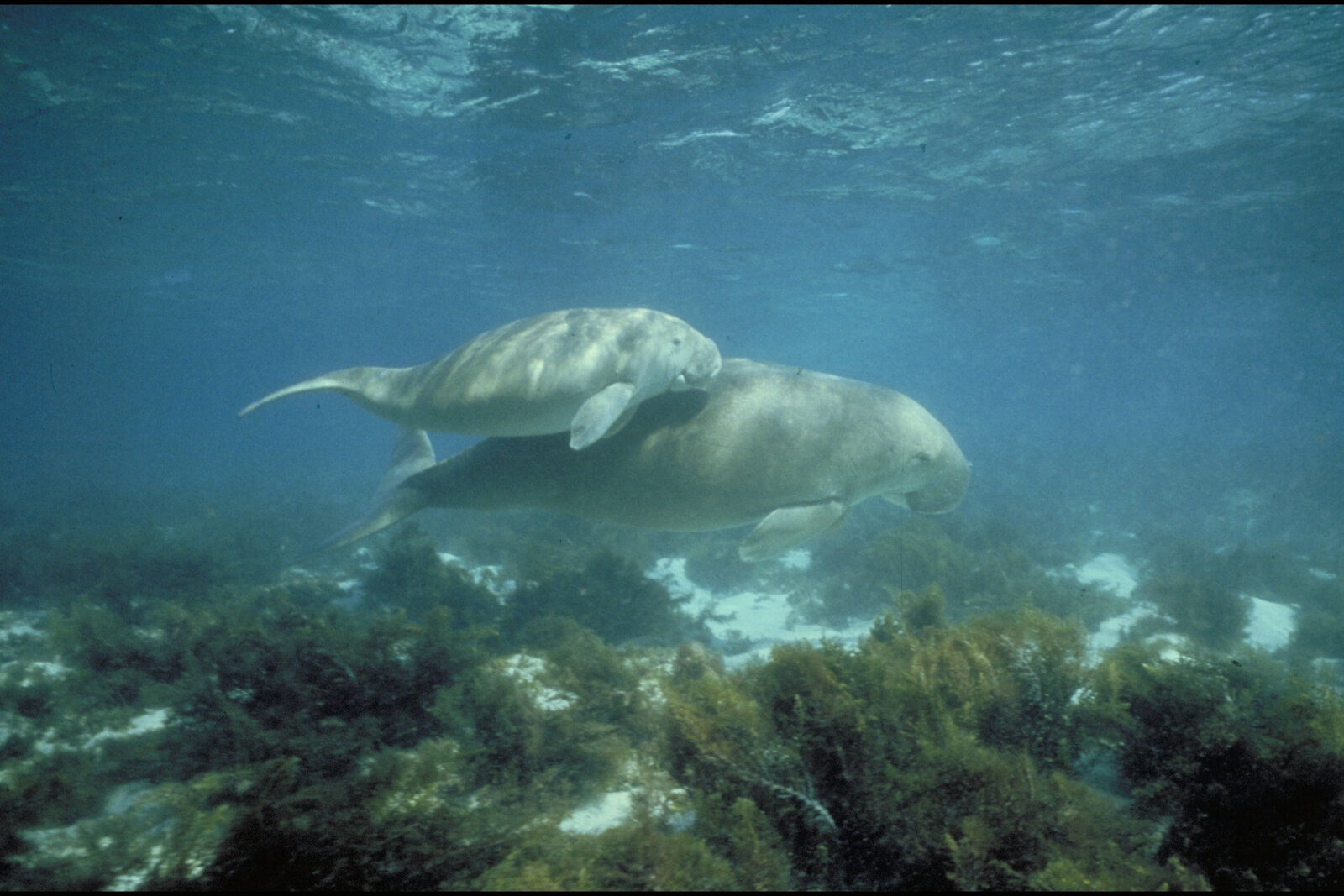
Dugongs

Sirenia is an order of fully aquatic, herbivorous mammals that live in rivers and marine wetlands. It includes four extant species, three manatees and the dugong, and the extinct Stellar's sea cow.

- Family: Dugongidae
  - Genus: Dugong
    - Dugong, D. dugon VU

== Order: Scandentia (treeshrews) ==
The treeshrews are small mammals native to the tropical forests of Southeast Asia. Although called treeshrews, they are not true shrews and are not all arboreal.

- Family: Tupaiidae (tree shrews)
  - Genus: Dendrogale
    - Northern smooth-tailed treeshrew, D. murina LC
  - Genus: Tupaia
    - Northern treeshrew, T. belangeri LC

== Order: Dermoptera (colugos) ==
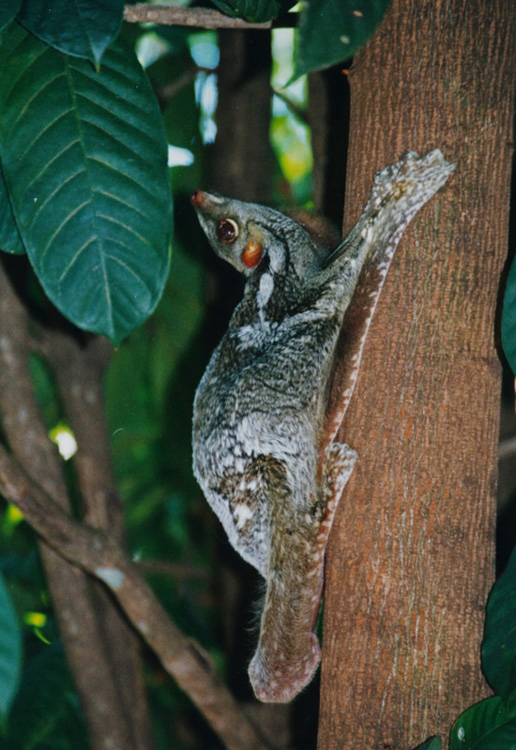
Sunda flying lemur

The two species of colugos make up the order Dermoptera. They are arboreal gliding mammals found in Southeast Asia.

- Family: Cynocephalidae (flying lemurs)
  - Genus: Galeopterus
    - Sunda flying lemur, G. variegatus LC

== Order: Primates ==
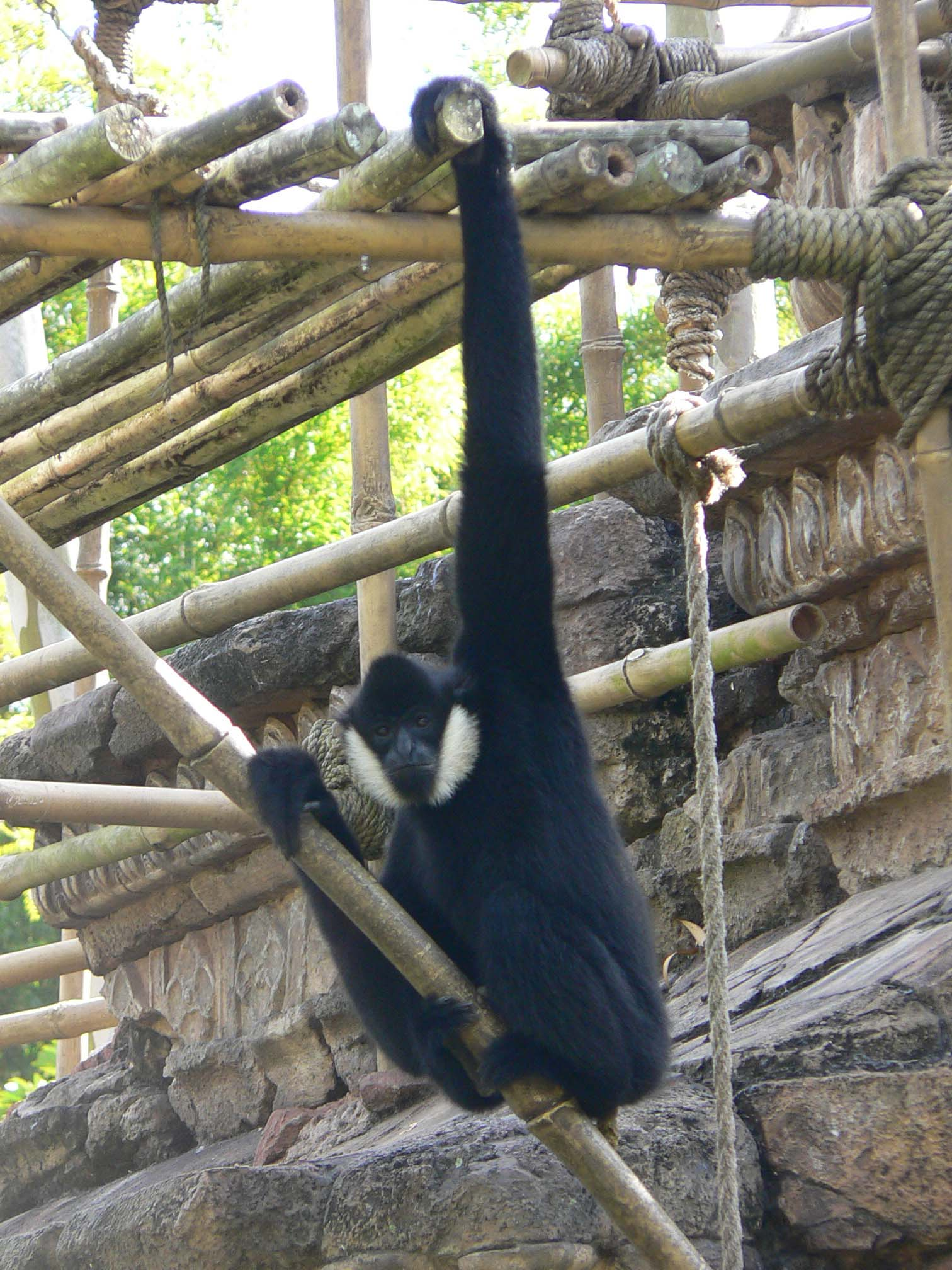
Black crested gibbon

The order Primates contains humans and their closest relatives: lemurs, lorisoids, monkeys, and apes.

- Suborder: Strepsirrhini
  - Infraorder: Lemuriformes
    - Superfamily: Lorisoidea
      - Family: Lorisidae (lorises, bushbabies)
        - Genus: Nycticebus
          - Bengal slow loris, N. bengalensis EN
          - Pygmy slow loris, N. pygmaeus EN
- Suborder: Haplorhini
  - Infraorder: Simiiformes
    - Parvorder: Catarrhini
      - Superfamily: Cercopithecoidea
        - Family: Cercopithecidae (Old World monkeys)
          - Genus: Macaca
            - Stump-tailed macaque, M. arctoides VU
            - Assam macaque, M. assamensis NT
            - Crab-eating macaque, M. fascicularis VU
            - Northern pigtail macaque, M. leonina VU
            - Rhesus macaque, M. mulatta LC
          - Subfamily: Colobinae
            - Genus: Trachypithecus
              - Indochinese grey langur, T. crepusculus EN
              - Delacour's langur, T. delacouri CR
              - Indochinese black langur, T. ebenus
              - Francois' langur, Trachypithecus francoisi VU
              - Germain's langur, Trachypithecus germaini EN
              - Hatinh langur, Trachypithecus hatinhensis EN
              - Annamese langur, Trachypithecus margarita
              - Cat Ba langur, T. poliocephalus CR
            - Genus: Pygathrix
              - Gray-shanked douc, Pygathrix cinerea CR
              - Red-shanked douc, Pygathrix nemaeus EN
              - Black-shanked douc, Pygathrix nigripes EN
            - Genus: Rhinopithecus
              - Tonkin snub-nosed langur, Rhinopithecus avunculus CR
      - Superfamily: Hominoidea
        - Family: Hylobatidae (gibbons)
          - Genus: Nomascus
            - Black crested gibbon, Nomascus concolor EN
            - Yellow-cheeked crested gibbon, Nomascus gabriellae VU
            - White-cheeked crested gibbon, Nomascus leucogenys DD
            - Eastern black crested gibbon, Nomascus nasutus CR
            - Northern buffed-cheeked gibbon, Nomascus annamensis
            - Southern white-cheeked gibbon, Nomascus siki EN

== Order: Rodentia (rodents) ==
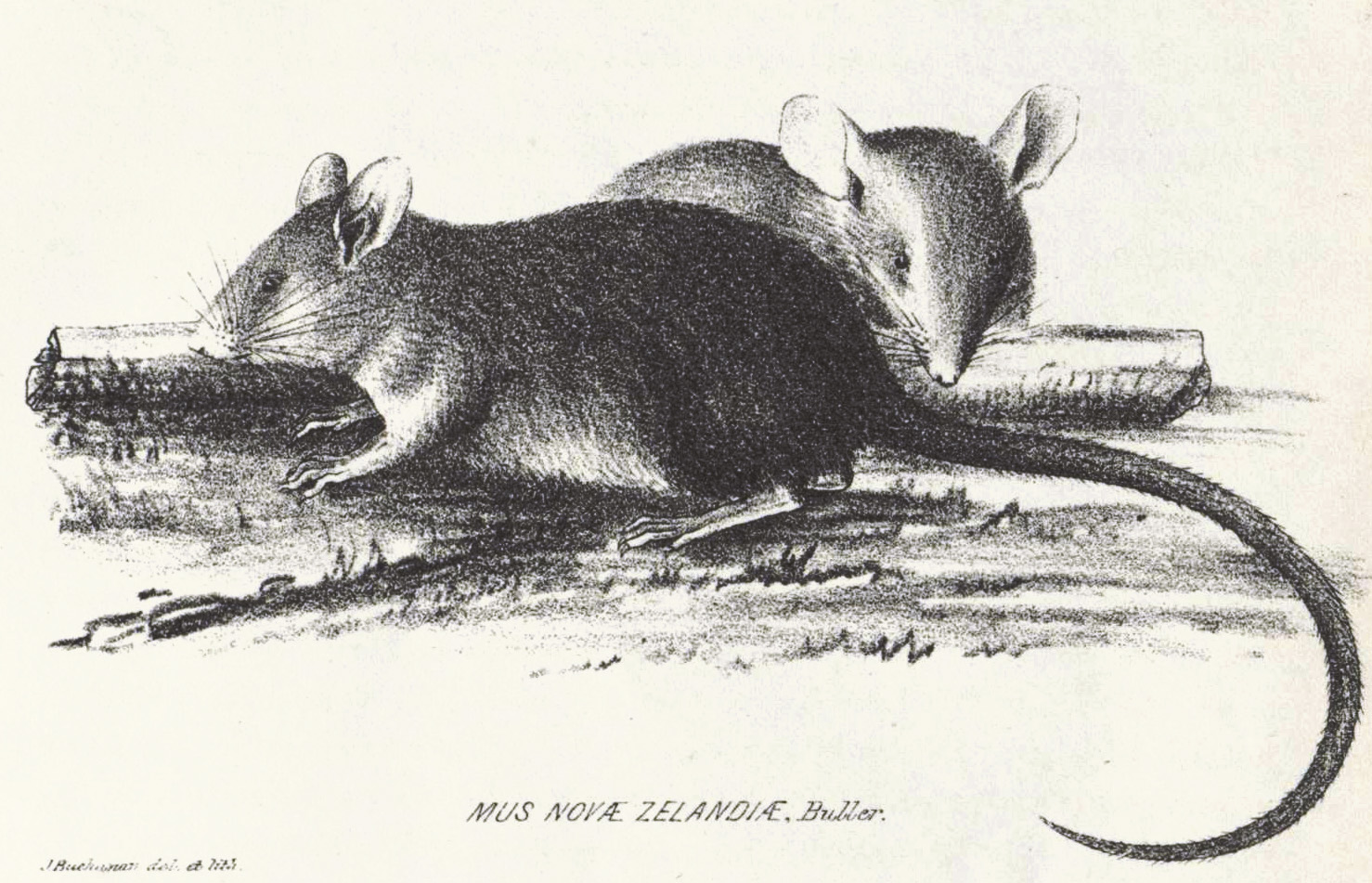
Polynesian rat

Rodents make up the largest order of mammals, with over 40% of mammalian species. They have two incisors in the upper and lower jaw which grow continually and must be kept short by gnawing. Most rodents are small though the capybara can weigh up to 45 kg (99 lb).

- Suborder: Hystricognathi
  - Family: Hystricidae (Old World porcupines)
    - Genus: Atherurus
      - Asiatic brush-tailed porcupine, Atherurus macrourus
    - Genus: Hystrix
      - Malayan porcupine, H. brachyura LC
- Suborder: Sciurognathi
  - Family: Sciuridae (squirrels)
    - Subfamily: Ratufinae
      - Genus: Ratufa
        - Black giant squirrel, Ratufa bicolor
    - Subfamily: Sciurinae
      - Tribe: Pteromyini
        - Genus: Belomys
          - Hairy-footed flying squirrel, Belomys pearsonii
        - Genus: Hylopetes
          - Particolored flying squirrel, Hylopetes alboniger EN
          - Gray-cheeked flying squirrel, Hylopetes lepidus
          - Indochinese flying squirrel, Hylopetes phayrei
          - Red-cheeked flying squirrel, Hylopetes spadiceus
        - Genus: Petaurista
          - Spotted giant flying squirrel, Petaurista elegans
    - Subfamily: Callosciurinae
      - Genus: Callosciurus
        - Finlayson's squirrel, Callosciurus finlaysonii
        - Inornate squirrel, Callosciurus inornatus
        - Black-striped squirrel, Callosciurus nigrovittatus
      - Genus: Dremomys
        - Perny's long-nosed squirrel, Dremomys pernyi
        - Red-hipped squirrel, Dremomys pyrrhomerus
        - Asian red-cheeked squirrel, Dremomys rufigenis
      - Genus: Menetes
        - Berdmore's ground squirrel, Menetes berdmorei
      - Genus: Sundasciurus
        - Horse-tailed squirrel, Sundasciurus hippurus
      - Genus: Tamiops
        - Himalayan striped squirrel, Tamiops macclellandi
        - Maritime striped squirrel, Tamiops maritimus
        - Cambodian striped squirrel, Tamiops rodolphei
        - Swinhoe's striped squirrel, Tamiops swinhoei
  - Family: Platacanthomyidae
    - Genus: Typhlomys
      - Chapa pygmy dormouse, Typhlomys chapensis CR
  - Family: Spalacidae
    - Subfamily: Rhizomyinae
      - Genus: Rhizomys
        - Hoary bamboo rat, Rhizomys pruinosus
        - Chinese bamboo rat, Rhizomys sinensis
        - Large bamboo rat, Rhizomys sumatrensis
  - Family: Muridae (mice, rats, voles, gerbils, hamsters, etc.)
    - Subfamily: Murinae
      - Genus: Bandicota
        - Greater bandicoot rat, Bandicota indica
        - Savile's bandicoot rat, Bandicota savilei
      - Genus: Berylmys
        - Small white-toothed rat, Berylmys berdmorei
        - Bower's white-toothed rat, Berylmys bowersi
        - Kenneth's white-toothed rat, Berylmys mackenziei
      - Genus: Chiromyscus
        - Fea's tree rat, Chiromyscus chiropus
      - Genus: Chiropodomys
        - Pencil-tailed tree mouse, Chiropodomys gliroides
      - Genus: Hapalomys
        - Delacour's marmoset rat, Hapalomys delacouri
      - Genus: Leopoldamys
        - Edwards's long-tailed giant rat, Leopoldamys edwardsi
        - Long-tailed giant rat, Leopoldamys sabanus
      - Genus: Maxomys
        - Mo's spiny rat, Maxomys moi
        - Red spiny rat, Maxomys surifer
      - Genus: Mus
        - Ryukyu mouse, Mus caroli
        - Fawn-colored mouse, Mus cervicolor
        - Cook's mouse, Mus cookii
        - Gairdner's shrewmouse, Mus pahari
        - Shortridge's mouse, Mus shortridgei
      - Genus: Niviventer
        - Chestnut white-bellied rat, Niviventer fulvescens
        - Lang Bian white-bellied rat, Niviventer langbianis
        - Tenasserim white-bellied rat, Niviventer tenaster
      - Genus: Rattus
        - Rice-field rat, Rattus argentiventer
        - Polynesian rat, Rattus exulans
        - Lesser rice-field rat, Rattus losea
        - Himalayan field rat, Rattus nitidus
        - Osgood's rat, Rattus osgoodi
        - Sikkim rat, Rattus sikkimensis VU
        - Tanezumi rat, Rattus tanezumi
      - Genus: Vandeleuria
        - Asiatic long-tailed climbing mouse, Vandeleuria oleracea

== Order: Lagomorpha (lagomorphs) ==
The lagomorphs comprise two families, Leporidae (hares and rabbits), and Ochotonidae (pikas). Though they can resemble rodents, and were classified as a superfamily in that order until the early 20th century, they have since been considered a separate order. They differ from rodents in a number of physical characteristics, such as having four incisors in the upper jaw rather than two.

- Family: Leporidae (rabbits, hares)
  - Genus: Nesolagus
    - Annamite striped rabbit, Nesolagus timminsi
  - Genus: Lepus
    - Burmese hare, Lepus peguensis
    - Chinese hare, Lepus sinensis

== Order: Eulipotyphla (shrews, hedgehogs, gymnures, moles and solenodons) ==
Eulipotyphlans are insectivorous mammals. Shrews and solenodons resemble mice, hedgehogs carry spines, gymnures look more like large rats, while moles are stout-bodied burrowers.

- Family: Erinaceidae (hedgehogs and gymnures)
  - Subfamily: Galericinae
    - Genus: Hylomys
      - Shrew gymnure, Neotetracus sinensis
      - Dalat gymnure, Hylomys macarong
      - Northern short-tailed gymnure, Hylomys peguensis
- Family: Soricidae (shrews)
  - Subfamily: Crocidurinae
    - Genus: Crocidura
      - Crocidura annamitensis
      - Grey shrew, Crocidura attenuata
      - Southeast Asian shrew, Crocidura fuliginosa
      - Crocidura guy
      - Crocidura indochinensis
      - Crocidura kegoensis
      - Crocidura phanluongi
      - Crocidura phuquocensis
      - Crocidura sokolovi
      - Crocidura wuchihensis
      - Crocidura zaitsevi
    - Genus: Suncus
      - Asian house shrew, S. murinus LC
  - Subfamily: Soricinae
    - Tribe: Anourosoricini
      - Genus: Anourosorex
        - Chinese mole shrew, Anourosorex squamipes
    - Tribe: Blarinellini
      - Genus: Blarinella
        - Blarinella griselda
    - Tribe: Nectogalini
      - Genus: Chimarrogale
        - Himalayan water shrew, Chimarrogale himalayica
      - Genus: Soriculus
        - Long-tailed brown-toothed shrew, Soriculus leucops
        - Long-tailed mountain shrew, Soriculus macrurus
        - Lowe's shrew, Soriculus parca
- Family: Talpidae (moles)
  - Subfamily: Talpinae
    - Tribe: Talpini
      - Genus: Euroscaptor
        - Greater Chinese mole, Euroscaptor grandis
        - Himalayan mole, Euroscaptor micrura
        - Small-toothed mole, Euroscaptor parvidens CR

== Order: Chiroptera (bats) ==
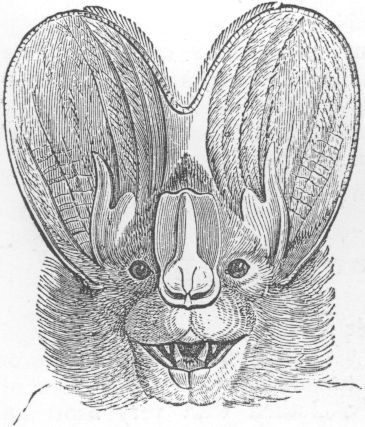
Megaderma lyra

The bats' most distinguishing feature is that their forelimbs are developed as wings, making them the only mammals capable of flight. Bat species account for about 20% of all mammals.

- Family: Pteropodidae (flying foxes, Old World fruit bats)
  - Subfamily: Pteropodinae
    - Genus: Cynopterus
      - Lesser short-nosed fruit bat, C. brachyotis LC
      - Greater short-nosed fruit bat, Cynopterus sphinx
    - Genus: Megaerops
      - Megaerops ecaudatus
      - Ratanaworabhan's fruit bat, Megaerops niphanae
    - Genus: Pteropus
      - Small flying-fox, Pteropus hypomelanus
      - Lyle's flying fox, Pteropus lylei
    - Genus: Rousettus
      - Geoffroy's rousette, Rousettus amplexicaudatus
      - Leschenault's rousette, Rousettus leschenaulti
  - Subfamily: Macroglossinae
    - Genus: Macroglossus
      - Long-tongued nectar bat, Macroglossus minimus
      - Long-tongued fruit bat, Macroglossus sobrinus
- Family: Vespertilionidae
  - Subfamily: Kerivoulinae
    - Genus: Kerivoula
      - Papillose woolly bat, Kerivoula papillosa
      - Painted bat, Kerivoula picta
  - Subfamily: Myotinae
    - Genus: Myotis
      - Large-footed bat, Myotis adversus
      - Large myotis, Myotis chinensis
      - Lesser large-footed bat, Myotis hasseltii
      - Horsfield's bat, Myotis horsfieldii
      - Kashmir cave bat, Myotis longipes
      - Whiskered myotis, Myotis muricola
      - Himalayan whiskered bat, Myotis siligorensis
      - Annamit myotis, Myotis annamiticus
  - Subfamily: Vespertilioninae
    - Genus: Hypsugo
      - Cadorna's pipistrelle, Hypsugo cadornae
      - Chinese pipistrelle, Hypsugo pulveratus
    - Genus: Ia
      - Great evening bat, I. io NT
    - Genus: Nyctalus
      - Common noctule, Nyctalus noctula
    - Genus: Pipistrellus
      - Kelaart's pipistrelle, Pipistrellus ceylonicus
      - Java pipistrelle, Pipistrellus javanicus
      - Mount Popa pipistrelle, Pipistrellus paterculus
      - Least pipistrelle, Pipistrellus tenuis
    - Genus: Scotomanes
      - Harlequin bat, Scotomanes ornatus
    - Genus: Scotophilus
      - Greater Asiatic yellow bat, Scotophilus heathi
  - Subfamily: Murininae
    - Genus: Murina
      - Round-eared tube-nosed bat, Murina cyclotis
      - Hutton's tube-nosed bat, Murina huttoni
      - Scully's tube-nosed bat, Murina tubinaris
  - Subfamily: Miniopterinae
    - Genus: Miniopterus
      - Western bent-winged bat, Miniopterus magnater
      - Small bent-winged bat, Miniopterus pusillus
      - Common bent-wing bat, M. schreibersii VU
- Family: Molossidae
  - Genus: Chaerephon
    - Wrinkle-lipped free-tailed bat, Chaerephon plicata
- Family: Emballonuridae
  - Genus: Taphozous
    - Black-bearded tomb bat, Taphozous melanopogon
    - Theobald's tomb bat, Taphozous theobaldi
- Family: Megadermatidae
  - Genus: Megaderma
    - Greater false vampire bat, Megaderma lyra
    - Lesser false vampire bat, Megaderma spasma
- Family: Rhinolophidae
  - Subfamily: Rhinolophinae
    - Genus: Rhinolophus
      - Intermediate horseshoe bat, Rhinolophus affinis
      - Bornean horseshoe bat, Rhinolophus borneensis
      - Woolly horseshoe bat, Rhinolophus luctus
      - Big-eared horseshoe bat, Rhinolophus macrotis
      - Malayan horseshoe bat, Rhinolophus malayanus
      - Marshall's horseshoe bat, Rhinolophus marshalli
      - Bourret's horseshoe bat, Rhinolophus paradoxolophus VU
      - Pearson's horseshoe bat, Rhinolophus pearsoni
      - Rufous horseshoe bat, Rhinolophus rouxi
      - Chinese rufous horseshoe bat, Rhinolophus sinicus
      - Lesser brown horseshoe bat, Rhinolophus stheno
      - Little Nepalese horseshoe bat, Rhinolophus subbadius DD
      - Thomas's horseshoe bat, Rhinolophus thomasi
  - Subfamily: Hipposiderinae
    - Genus: Aselliscus
      - Stoliczka's trident bat, Aselliscus stoliczkanus
    - Genus: Coelops
      - Tail-less leaf-nosed bat, Coelops frithii
    - Genus: Hipposideros
      - Great roundleaf bat, Hipposideros armiger
      - Dusky roundleaf bat, Hipposideros ater
      - Ashy roundleaf bat, Hipposideros cineraceus
      - Diadem roundleaf bat, Hipposideros diadema
      - Fulvus roundleaf bat, Hipposideros fulvus
      - Intermediate roundleaf bat, Hipposideros larvatus
      - Pratt's roundleaf bat, Hipposideros pratti
      - Lesser great leaf-nosed bat, Hipposideros turpis EN

== Order: Pholidota (pangolins) ==
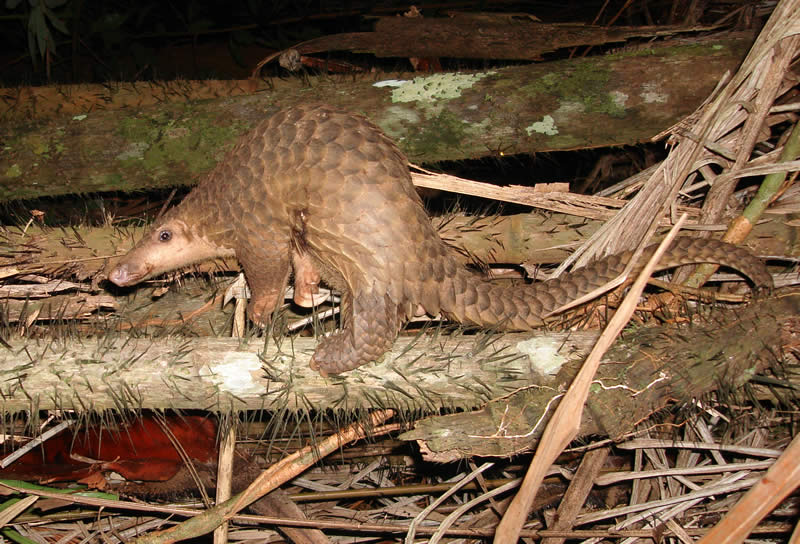
Sunda pangolin

The order Pholidota comprises the eight species of pangolin. Pangolins are anteaters and have the powerful claws, elongated snout and long tongue seen in the other unrelated anteater species.

- Family: Manidae
  - Genus: Manis
    - Sunda pangolin, M. javanica CR
    - Chinese pangolin, M. pentadactyla CR

== Order: Cetacea (whales) ==
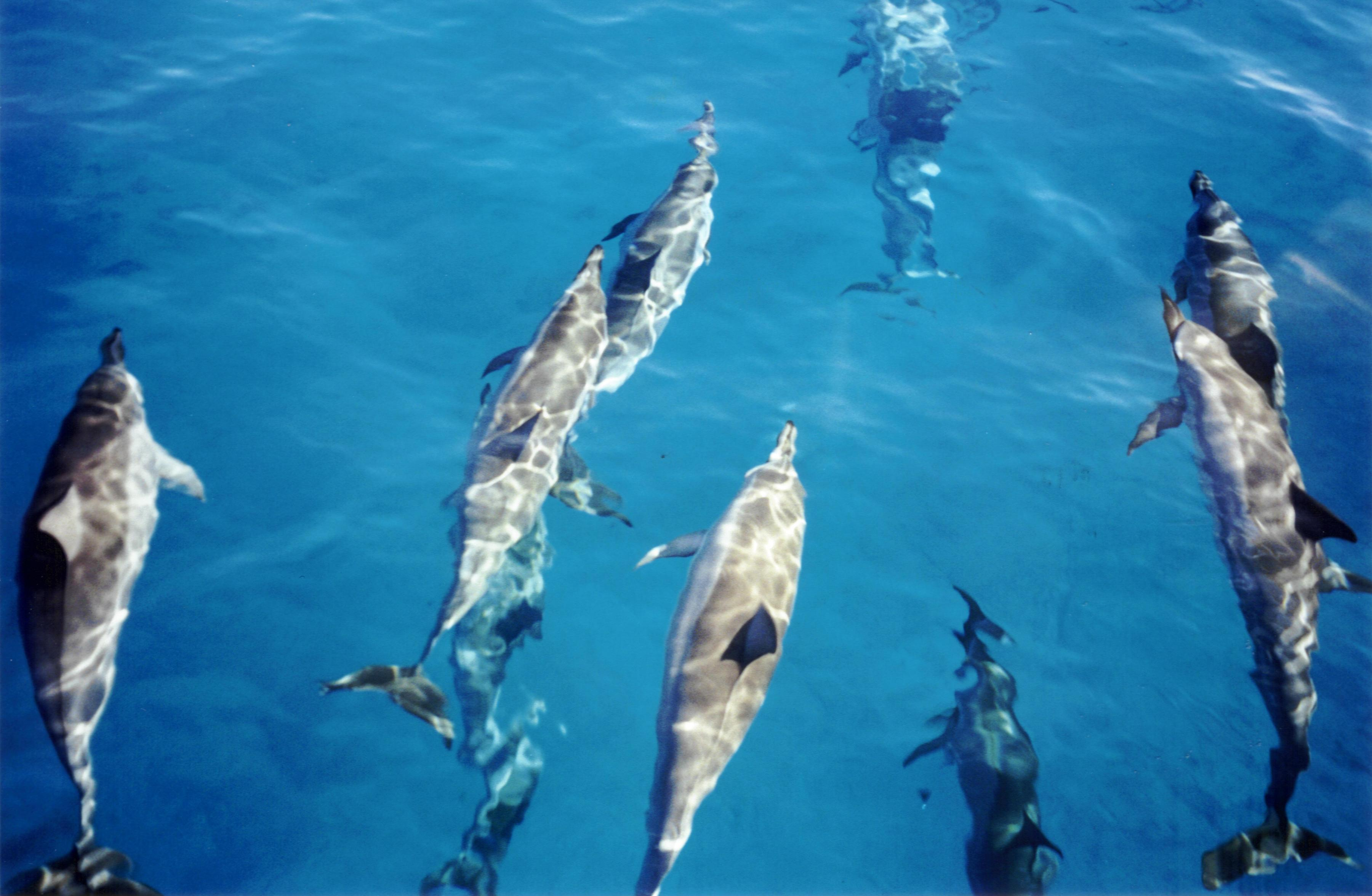
Spinner dolphins

Orcas

The order Cetacea includes whales, dolphins and porpoises. They are the mammals most fully adapted to aquatic life with a spindle-shaped nearly hairless body, protected by a thick layer of blubber, and forelimbs and tail modified to provide propulsion underwater.

- Suborder: Mysticeti (baleen whales)
  - Family: Eschrichtiidae
    - Genus: Eschrichtius
      - Western gray whale, Eschrichtius robustus CR
- Family: Balaenopteridae (rorquals)
  - Subfamily: Megapterinae
    - Genus: Megaptera
      - Humpback whale, Megaptera novaeangliae LC
    - Subfamily: Balaenopterinae
      - Genus: Balaenoptera
        - Common minke whale, B. acutorostrata LC
        - Omura's whale, Balaenoptera omurai DD
        - Eden's whale, Balaenoptera edeni DD
        - Northern blue whale, Balaenoptera musculus CR
- Suborder: Odontoceti (toothed whales)
  - Superfamily: Platanistoidea
    - Family: Phocoenidae
      - Genus: Neophocaena
        - Finless porpoise, Neophocaena phocaenoides DD
    - Family: Kogiidae
      - Genus: Kogia
        - Dwarf sperm whale, Kogia sima
    - Family: Ziphidae
      - Subfamily: Hyperoodontinae
        - Genus: Mesoplodon
          - Blainville's beaked whale, Mesoplodon densirostris DD
    - Family: Delphinidae (marine dolphins)
      - Genus: Sousa
        - Sousa chinensis DD
      - Genus: Tursiops
        - Bottlenose dolphin, Tursiops aduncus DD
      - Genus: Stenella
        - Spinner dolphin, Stenella longirostris
      - Genus: Delphinus
        - Common dolphin, Delphinus capensis
      - Genus: Lagenodelphis
        - Fraser's dolphin, Lagenodelphis hosei DD
      - Genus: Grampus
        - Risso's dolphin, Grampus griseus DD
      - Genus: Peponocephala
        - Melon-headed whale, Peponocephala electra
      - Genus: Feresa
        - Pygmy killer whale, Feresa attenuata DD
      - Genus: Orcinus
        - Orca, O. orca DD
      - Genus: Orcaella
        - Irrawaddy dolphin, O. brevirostris EN

== Order: Carnivora (carnivorans) ==
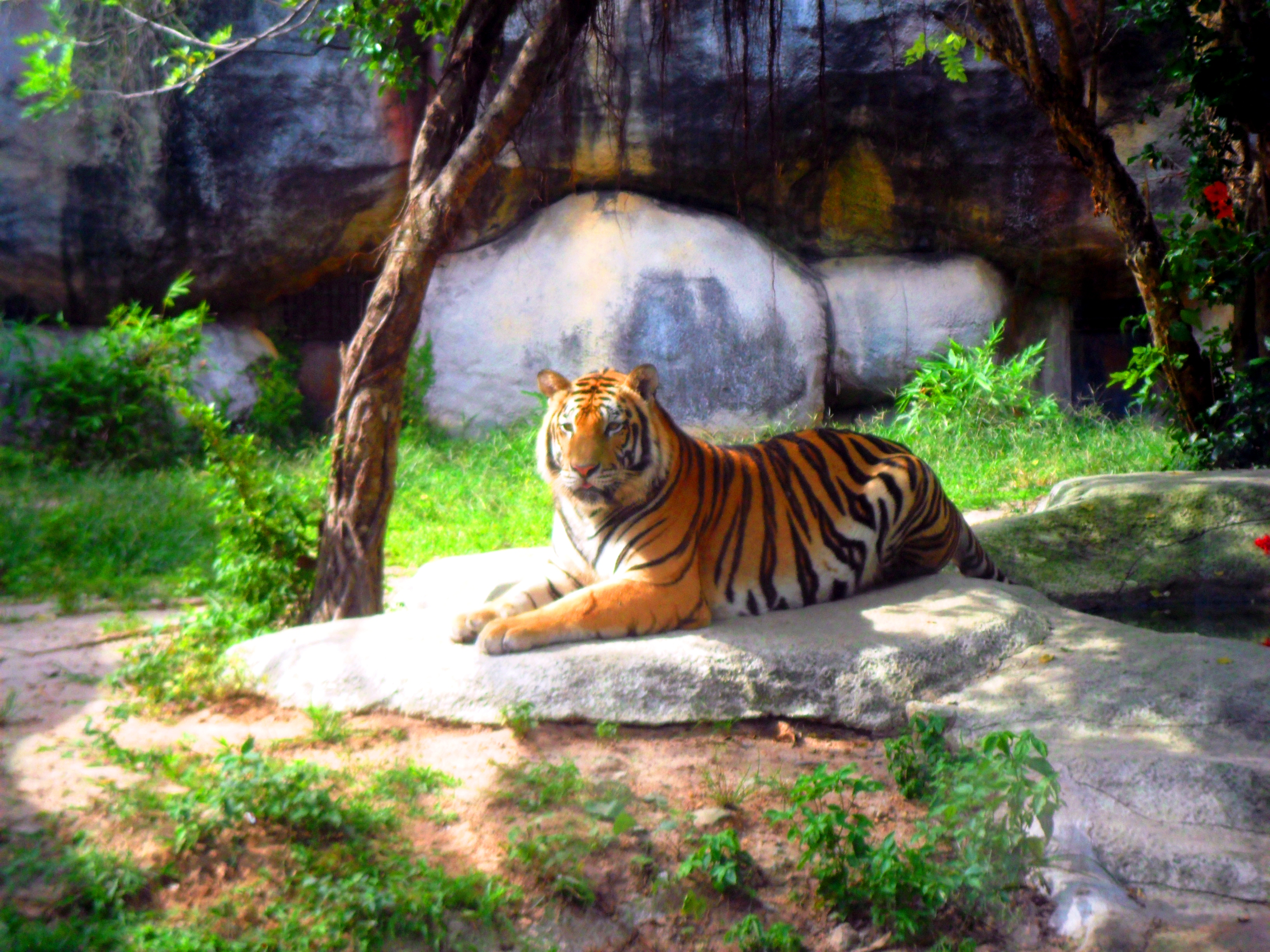
Tiger

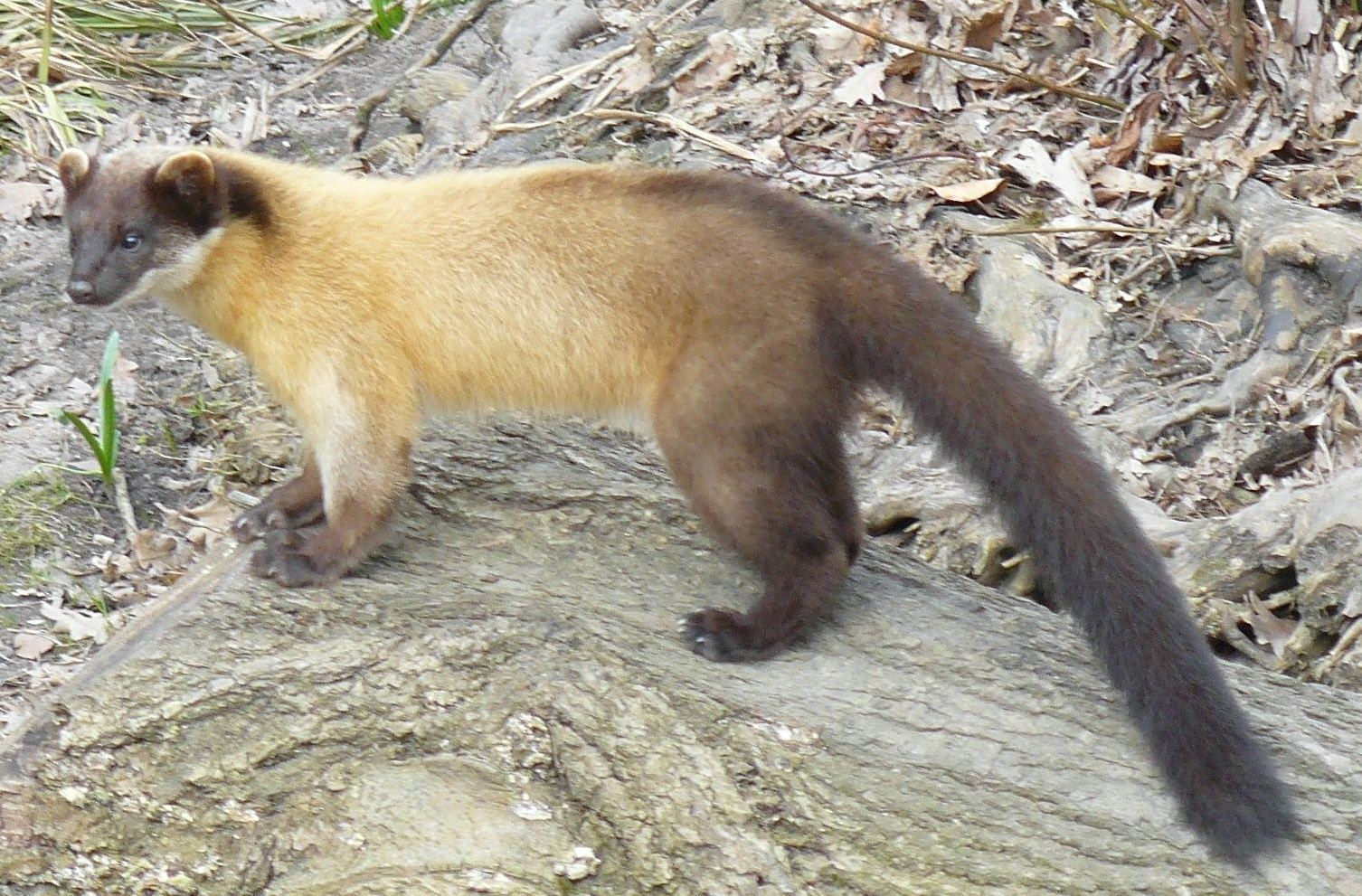
Yellow-throated marten

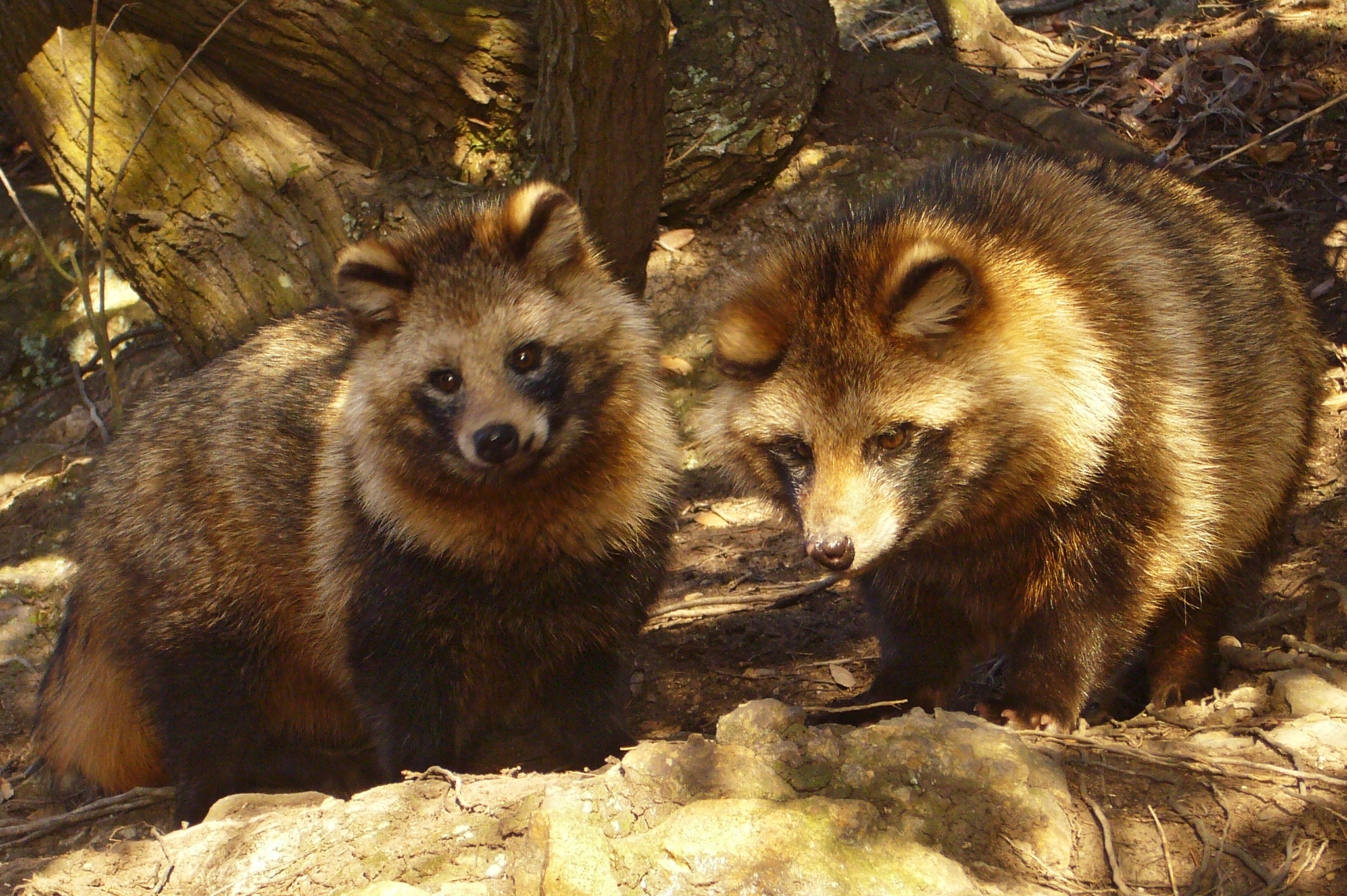
Raccoon dog

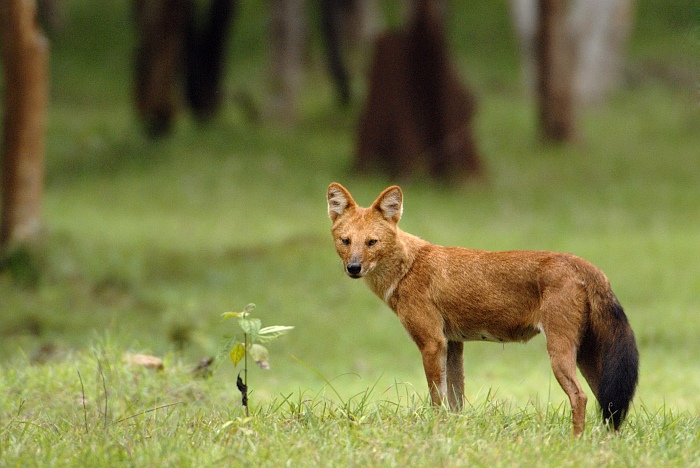
Dhole

There are over 260 species of carnivorans, the majority of which feed primarily on meat. They have a characteristic skull shape and dentition.

- Suborder: Feliformia
  - Family: Felidae (cats)
    - Subfamily: Felinae
      - Genus: Catopuma
        - Asian golden cat NT
      - Genus: Felis
        - Jungle cat, F. chaus LC
      - Genus: Pardofelis
        - Marbled cat, P. marmorata NT
      - Genus: Prionailurus
        - Leopard cat, P. bengalensis LC
        - Fishing cat, P. viverrinus VU presence uncertain
    - Subfamily: Pantherinae
      - Genus: Neofelis
        - Clouded leopard, N. nebulosa VU possibly extant
      - Genus: Panthera
        - Tiger, P. tigris EN possibly extirpated
          - Indochinese tiger, P. t. tigris CR possibly extirpated
  - Family: Viverridae (civets, mongooses, etc.)
    - Subfamily: Paradoxurinae
      - Genus: Arctictis
        - Binturong, A. binturong VU
      - Genus: Arctogalidia
        - Small-toothed palm civet, A. trivirgata LC
      - Genus: Paguma
        - Masked palm civet, P. larvata LC
      - Genus: Paradoxurus
        - Asian palm civet, P. hermaphroditus LC
    - Subfamily: Hemigalinae
      - Genus: Chrotogale
        - Owston's palm civet, Chrotogale owstoni EN
    - Subfamily: Prionodontinae
      - Genus: Prionodon
        - Spotted linsang, Prionodon pardicolor LC
    - Subfamily: Viverrinae
      - Genus: Viverra
        - Large-spotted civet, V. megaspila LC
        - Large Indian civet, V. zibetha LC
      - Genus: Viverricula
        - Small Indian civet, V. indica LC
  - Family: Herpestidae (mongooses)
    - Genus: Urva
      - Javan mongoose, U. javanica LC
      - Crab-eating mongoose, U. urva LC
- Suborder: Caniformia
  - Family: Canidae (dogs, foxes)
    - Genus: Canis
      - Golden jackal, C. aureus LC
    - Genus: Cuon
      - Dhole, C. alpinus EN possibly extirpated
    - Genus: Nyctereutes
      - Raccoon dog, N. procyonoides LC
    - Genus: Vulpes
      - Red fox, V. vulpes LC
  - Family: Ursidae (bears)
    - Genus: Helarctos
      - Sun bear, H. malayanus VU
    - Genus: Ursus
      - Asiatic black bear, U. thibetanus VU
  - Family: Mustelidae (mustelids)
    - Genus: Aonyx
      - Asian small-clawed otter, A. cinereus VU
    - Genus: Arctonyx
      - Greater hog badger, A. collaris VU
    - Genus: Lutra
      - Eurasian otter, L. lutra NT
      - Hairy-nosed otter, L. sumatrana EN
    - Genus: Lutrogale
      - Smooth-coated otter, L. perspicillata VU
    - Genus: Martes
      - Yellow-throated marten, M. flavigula LC
    - Genus: Melogale
      - Chinese ferret badger, M. moschata LC
      - Burmese ferret badger, M. personata LC
    - Genus: Mustela
      - Yellow-bellied weasel, M. kathiah LC
      - Siberian weasel, M. sibirica LC
      - Back-striped weasel, M. strigidorsa LC

== Order: Artiodactyla (even-toed ungulates) ==
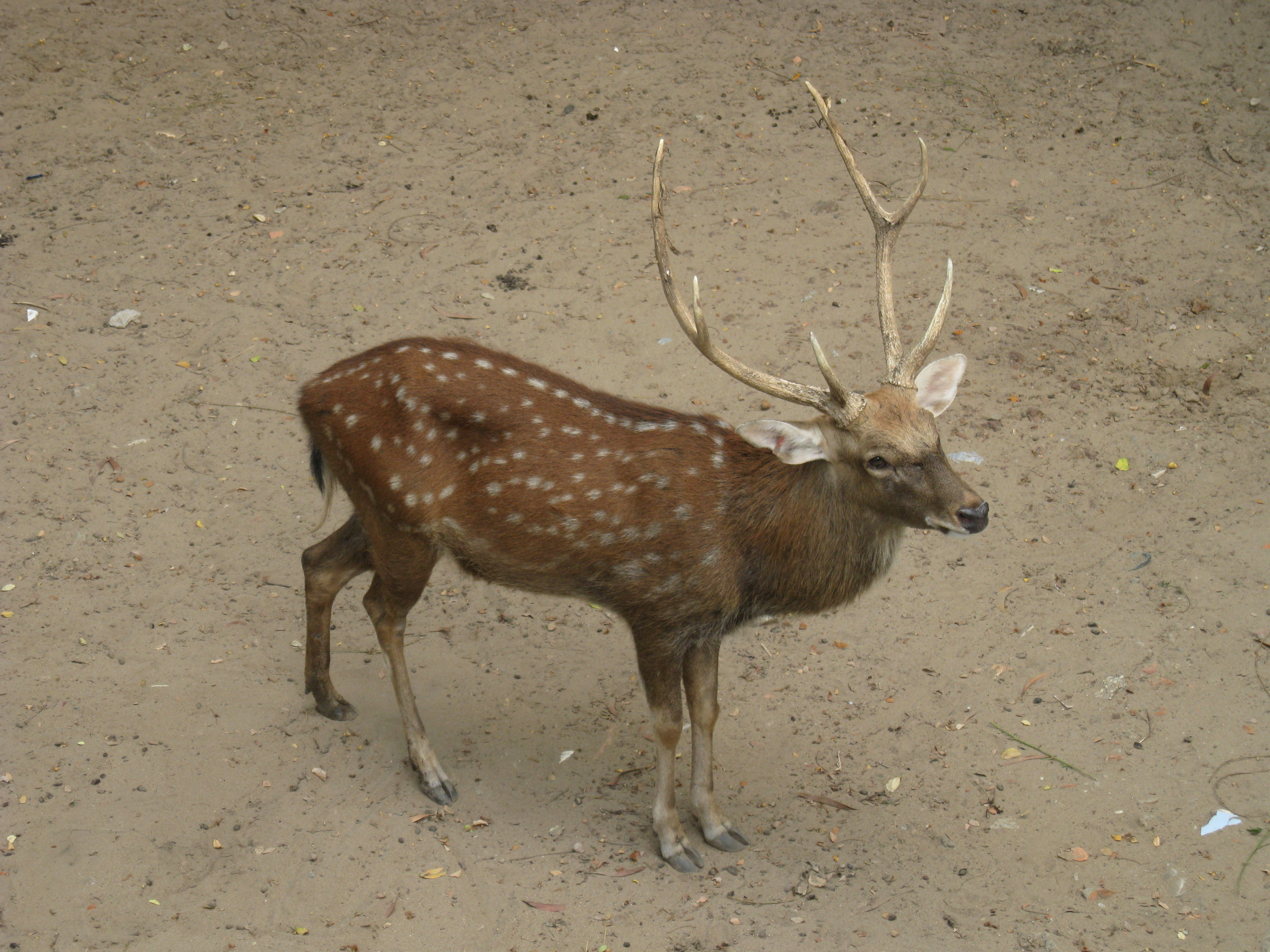
Sika deer

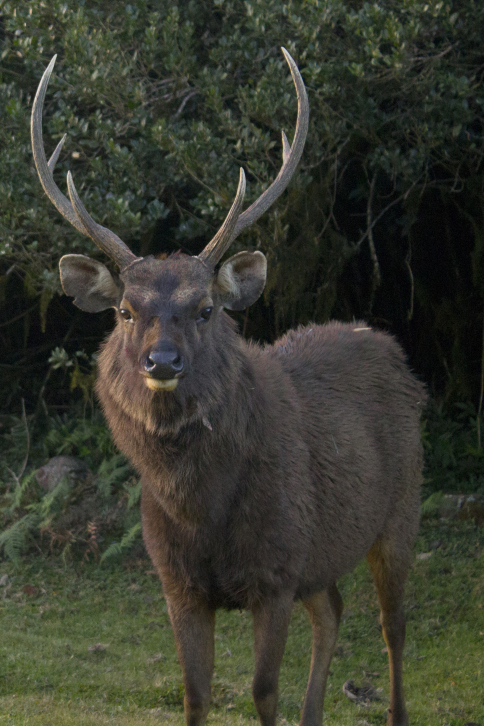
Sambar deer

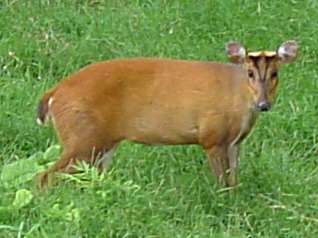
Indian muntjac

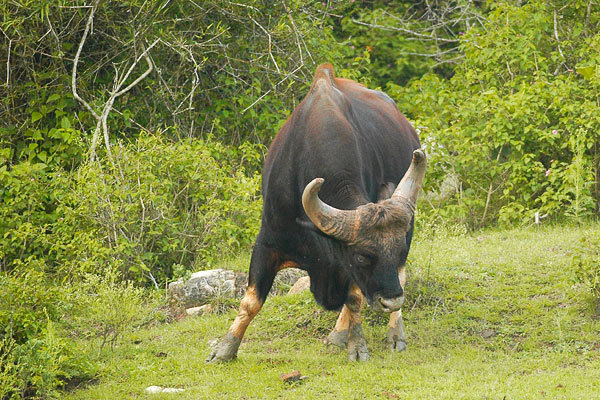
Gaur

The even-toed ungulates are ungulates whose weight is borne about equally by the third and fourth toes, rather than mostly or entirely by the third as in perissodactyls. There are about 220 artiodactyl species, including many that are of great economic importance to humans.

- Family: Tragulidae
  - Genus: Tragulus
    - Lesser mouse-deer, T. kanchil LC
    - Vietnam mouse-deer, T. versicolor DD
- Family: Moschidae
  - Genus: Moschus
    - Dwarf musk deer, M. berezovskii EN
- Family: Cervidae (deer)
  - Subfamily: Cervinae
    - Genus: Rusa
      - Sambar deer, R. unicolor VU
  - Subfamily: Muntiacinae
    - Genus: Muntiacus
      - Fea's muntjac, M. feae LC
      - Indian muntjac, M. muntjak LC
      - Pu Hoat muntjac, M. puhoatensis DD
      - Truong Son muntjac, M. truongsonensis DD
      - Giant muntjac, M. vuquangensis DD
- Family: Bovidae (cattle, antelope, sheep, goats)
  - Subfamily: Bovinae
    - Genus: Bos
      - Gaur, B. gaurus VU
      - Banteng, B. javanicus CR
    - Genus: Pseudoryx
      - Saola, P. nghetinhensis CR
  - Subfamily: Caprinae
    - Genus: Capricornis
      - Mainland serow, C. sumatraensis VU
        - Indochinese serow, C. s. maritimus
- Family: Suidae (pigs)
  - Subfamily: Suinae
    - Genus: Sus
      - Wild boar, S. scrofa LC

== Locally extinct ==
The following species are locally extinct in the country:

- Indian hog deer, Axis porcinus possibly extirpated
- Kouprey, Bos sauveli possibly extinct
- Wild water buffalo, Bubalus arnee
- Sika deer, Cervus nippon possibly extirpated
  - Vietnamese sika deer, C. n. pseudaxis
- Sumatran rhinoceros, Dicerorhinus sumatrensis
- Leopard, Panthera pardus possibly extirpated
- Javan rhinoceros, Rhinoceros sondaicus
- Eld's deer, Rucervus eldii possibly extirpated

== See also ==
- Wildlife of Vietnam
- List of chordate orders
- Lists of mammals by region
- List of prehistoric mammals
- Mammal classification
- List of mammals described in the 2000s
