= Javan tailless fruit bat =

Javan Tailless Fruit Bat

Conservation status
- Vulnerable (IUCN 3.1)

Scientific classification
- Kingdom: Animalia
- Phylum: Chordata
- Class: Mammalia
- Order: Chiroptera
- Family: Pteropodidae
- Genus: Megaerops
- Species: M. kusnotoi

Binomial name
- Megaerops kusnotoi Hill & Boeadi, 1978
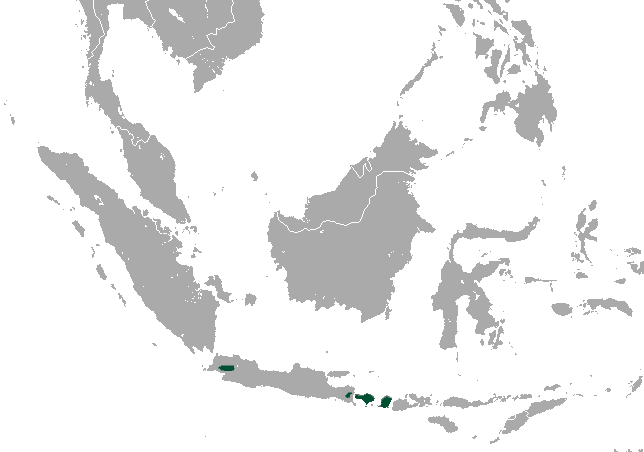
- Javan tailless fruit bat range

Species of bat

The Javan tailless fruit bat (Megaerops kusnotoi) is a species of megabat in the family Pteropodidae. It is endemic to Indonesia.

The consumption of bushmeat, meat from undomesticated animals, is a big ecological problem in Indonesia, and a threat to bat biodiversity. "Locals eat bats at least once a month, but the frequency increases tenfold around Christian holidays. Approximately 500 metric tons of bats are imported from other provinces, with South Sulawesi, Indonesia as the main provider at 38%." These high levels of excessive hunting and consumption of bats has made them become the most endangered species in Indonesia.
