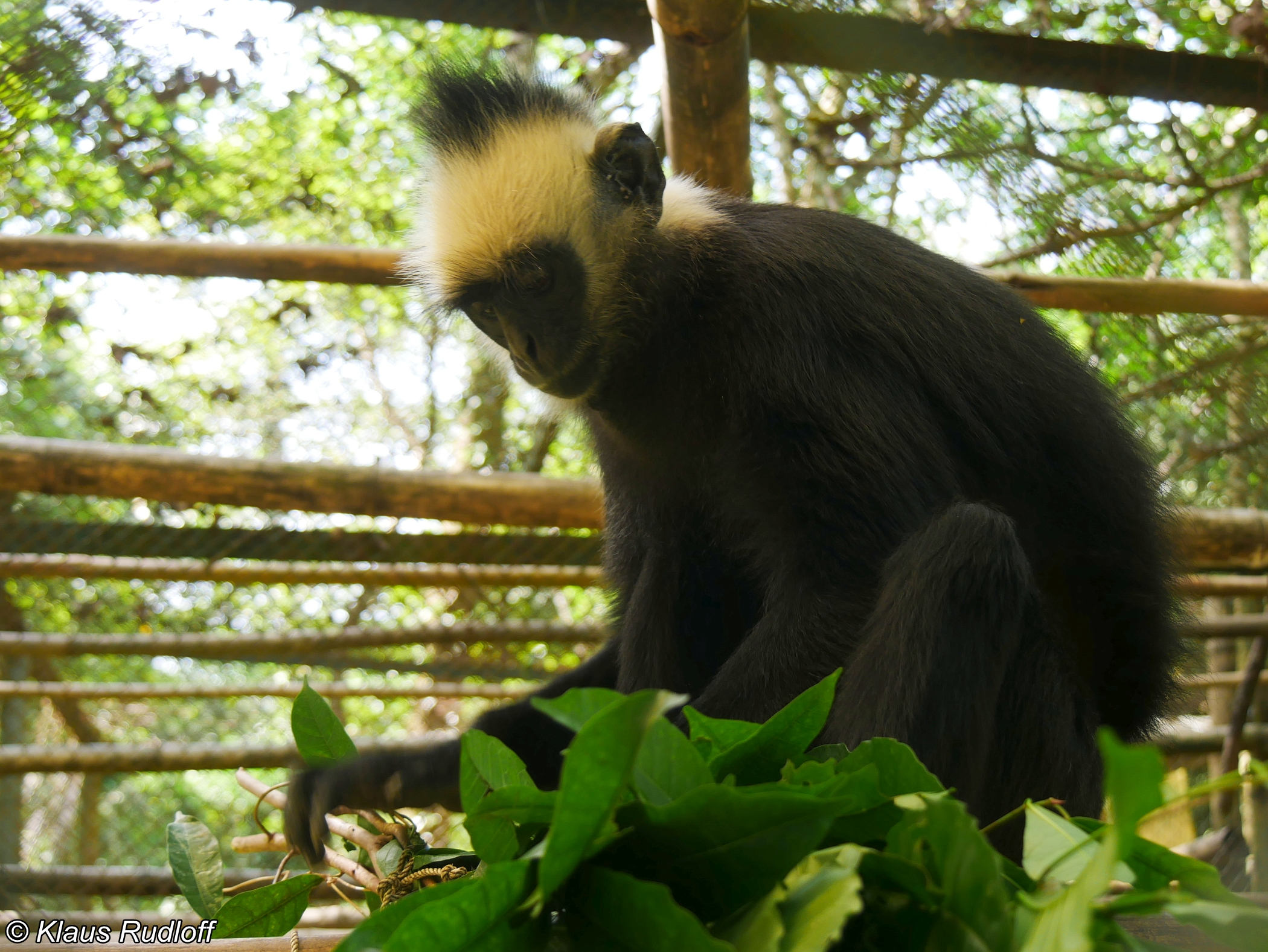

Conservation status
- Endangered (IUCN 3.1)

Scientific classification
- Kingdom: Animalia
- Phylum: Chordata
- Class: Mammalia
- Order: Primates
- Family: Cercopithecidae
- Genus: Trachypithecus
- Species group: Trachypithecus francoisi group
- Species: T. laotum

Binomial name
- Trachypithecus laotum (Thomas, 1921)
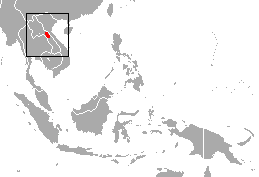
- Laotian langur range

= Laotian langur =

Species of Old World monkey

The Laotian langur or white-browed black langur (Trachypithecus laotum) is a species of the primate family Cercopithecidae that is endemic to Laos in Southeast Asia. It is closely related to other primates found in the region such as Indochinese black langur and Hatinh langur. It is classified as endangered in the IUCN Red List.

== Taxonomy ==
Laotian langur is a species of the primate family Cercopithecidae. It was first described by English zoologist Oldfield Thomas in 1921. Studies have found that the Laotian langur is genetically closely related to the Indochinese black langur and Hatinh langur. There has been suggestions zoologists to consider these as subspecies of the Laotian langur.

== Distribution and habitat ==
The species is endemic to Laos in Southeast Asia. Its natural habitat consists of subtropical or tropical dry forests. It is classified as endangered in the IUCN Red List. Studies in 2021 have indicated that the langur habitats have shrunk due to deforestation and hunting. Based on the sightings, the langur groups consisted of fewer members compared to earlier studies done in the 1990s. The langur habitats have been protected by the establishment of various protected areas such Nam Kading National Protected Area, Nam Ha National Protected Area, and Phou Hin Poun National Biodiversity Conservation Area.

== Morphology ==
The Laotian langur has a dark black fur covering most of the body. The face is black with white hair encircling it. It has small ruft of black hair on top of the head. New borns have a golden fur, which changes color while the monkeys grow. Juveniles have similar appearance to the adults though the fur color might be paler and are usually smaller in size. It has four fingers on the limbs with a short thumb, which is an adaptation for their arboreal lifestyle. The Laotian langur has a multi chambered stomach, which helps in the digestion of the plant matter.

== Behaviour ==
Laotian Langurs are primarily herbivorous and the diet consists of leaves, fruits, seeds, and flowers. They share a sympatric relationship with the Assamese macaque in their range. They often feed on the same trees, though the langurs occupy higher positions compared to the macaques. The langurs occupy limestone caves in rocks and cliffs, which serves as a shelter from predation and weather. As they consume a vegetation heavy diet, they often spend long times resting, and socializing.
