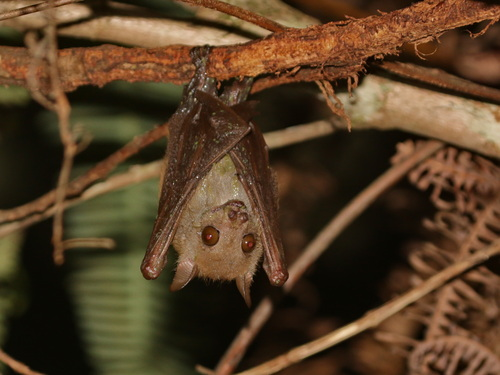
- Ratanaworabhan's Fruit Bat (Megaerops niphanae), observed by Ian Dugdale in Thailand

Conservation status
- Least Concern (IUCN 3.1)

Scientific classification
- Kingdom: Animalia
- Phylum: Chordata
- Class: Mammalia
- Infraclass: Placentalia
- Order: Chiroptera
- Family: Pteropodidae
- Genus: Megaerops
- Species: M. niphanae

Binomial name
- Megaerops niphanae Yenbutra & Felten, 1983
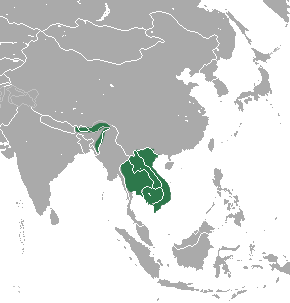
- Ratanaworabhan's fruit bat range

= Ratanaworabhan's fruit bat =

Species of bat

The Ratanaworabhan's fruit bat (Megaerops niphanae) is a species of megabat in the family Pteropodidae. It is found in Bhutan, India, Thailand, and Vietnam.
