= Indochinese black langur =

Scientific classification
- Kingdom: Animalia
- Phylum: Chordata
- Class: Mammalia
- Infraclass: Placentalia
- Order: Primates
- Family: Cercopithecidae
- Genus: Trachypithecus
- Species group: Trachypithecus francoisi group
- Species: T. ebenus

Binomial name
- Trachypithecus ebenus Brandon-Jones, 1995

Species of Old World monkey

The Indochinese black langur (Trachypithecus ebenus) is a poorly known Old World monkey native to Laos and adjacent Vietnam. It was originally described as a subspecies of T. auratus, but was later found to be a member of the T. francoisi group, with some maintaining it as a subspecies of that species. In 2001, it was recommended treating it as a separate species.

Except for its almost entirely black pelage, it resembles the other members of the T. francoisi group. Uniquely in this group, it and the related T. hatinhensis appear to be parapatric, T. ebenus showing what appears to be signs of intergradation with T. hatinhensis are known, and genetically the two barely are separable. This has led to suggestions that it may be a black morph of that taxon, which in turn possibly should be considered a subspecies of T. laotum. A survey that included 67 T. hatinhensis revealed a high level of variation in the amount of white to the head, and ebenus was maintained as a morph. It was formerly considered data deficient by IUCN, but they now include it in the endangered T. hatinhensis.
