= Megaerops =

Scientific classification
- Kingdom: Animalia
- Phylum: Chordata
- Class: Mammalia
- Order: Chiroptera
- Family: Pteropodidae
- Genus: Megaerops; Peters, 1865

Type species
- Pachysoma ecaudatum Temminck, 1837

Species
- Megaerops ecaudatus Megaerops kusnotoi Megaerops niphanae Megaerops albicollis

Genus of bats

Megaerops is a genus of megabat.

It includes the following species:

- Megaerops albicollis
- Tailless fruit bat (Megaerops ecaudatus)
- Javan tailless fruit bat (Megaerops kusnotoi)
- Ratanaworabhan's fruit bat (Megaerops niphanae)
