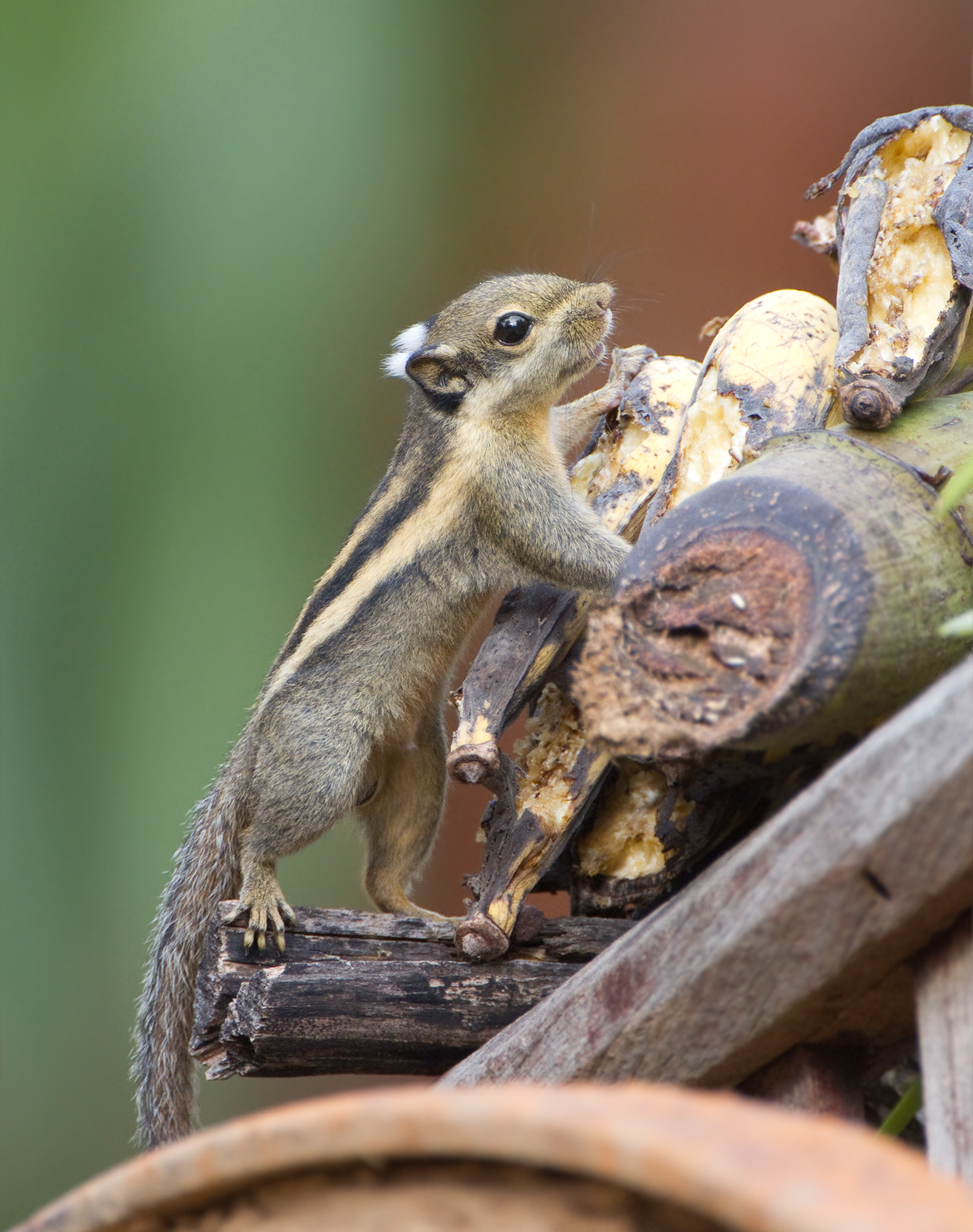
- Himalayan striped squirrel (Tamiops mcclellandii)

Scientific classification
- Kingdom: Animalia
- Phylum: Chordata
- Class: Mammalia
- Order: Rodentia
- Family: Sciuridae
- Subfamily: Callosciurinae
- Genus: Tamiops; J. A. Allen, 1906

Type species
- Tamiops macclellandi hainanus J. A. Allen, 1906 (= Tamiops maritimus hainanus J. A. Allen, 1906)

Species
- Tamiops maritimus Tamiops mcclellandii Tamiops minshanica Tamiops rodolphii Tamiops swinhoei

= Asiatic striped squirrel =

Asiatic striped squirrel Temporal range: Late Pliocene to recent

Genus of rodents

Asiatic striped squirrels are a genus (Tamiops) of squirrels (Sciuridae) in the subfamily Callosciurinae. They are small striped arboreal squirrels from Asia. Their head to body length measured from 10 to 13 cm. They often are confused with other squirrels (e.f. Funambulus or Tamias). In contrast to these other squirrels, they have smaller rounded ears with white-tipped hairs. A black longitudinal stripe is present in the middle of the back, which is parallel on both sides with two pairs of pale longitudinal stripes. These pale stripes are separated by dark brownish stripes. In some countries, they are kept as pets.

The four traditionally recognized species of Asiatic striped squirrels are:

- Himalayan striped squirrel, T. mcclellandii
- Maritime striped squirrel, T. maritimus
- Cambodian striped squirrel, T. rodolphii
- Swinhoe's striped squirrel, T. swinhoei

A fifth species was described in 2022:

- Minshan striped squirrel, T. minshanica

Asiatic striped squirrels can be identified by the differences in the stripe pattern. For example, in some species, the stripe of the cheek interrupts in the shoulder region and does not continue to the outermost pale stripe.

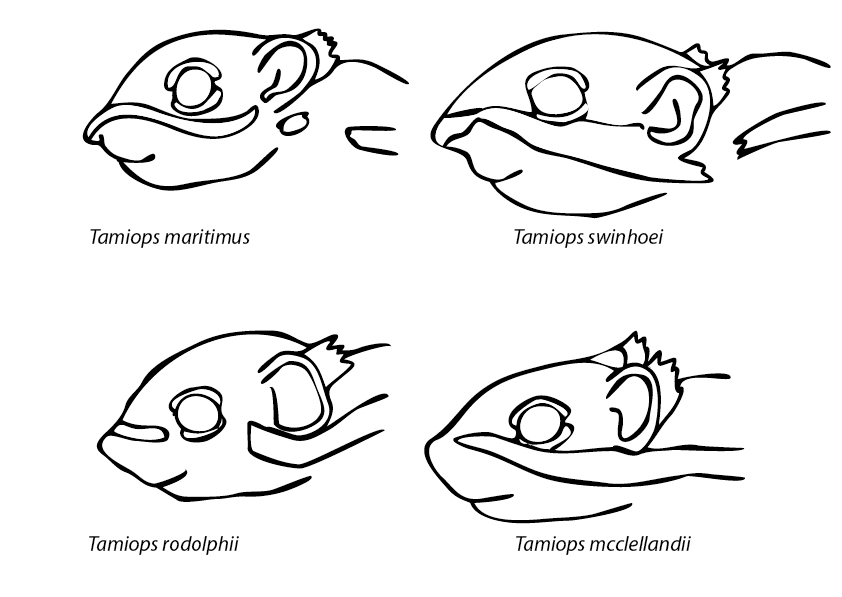
Drawings of differences in Asiatic striped squirrel species - close-up of the head region in lateral view
