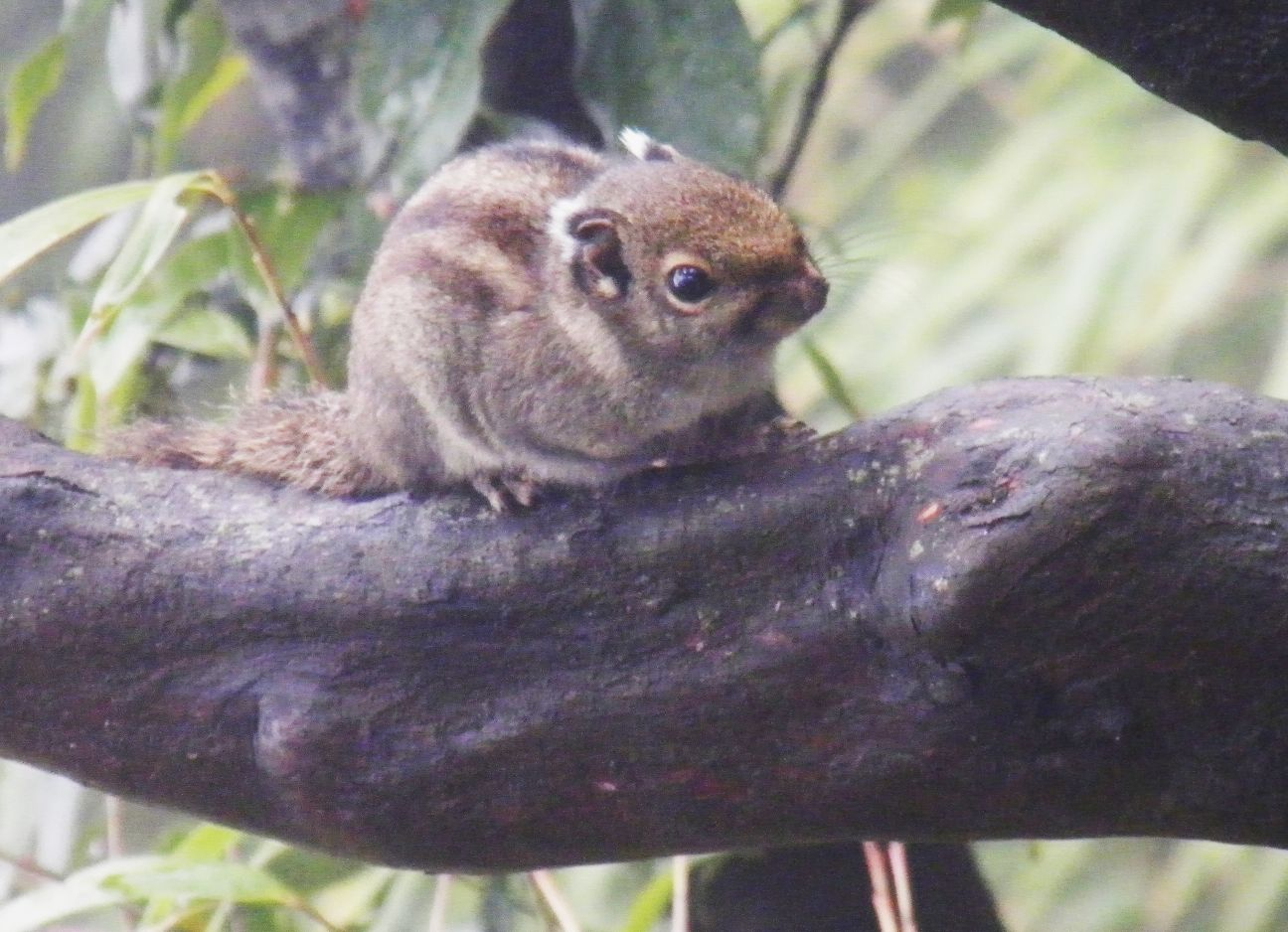
- at Mount Sanqing, Jiangxi

Conservation status
- Least Concern (IUCN 3.1)

Scientific classification
- Kingdom: Animalia
- Phylum: Chordata
- Class: Mammalia
- Infraclass: Placentalia
- Order: Rodentia
- Family: Sciuridae
- Genus: Tamiops
- Species: T. maritimus

Binomial name
- Tamiops maritimus (Bonhote, 1900)

Subspecies
- T. m. maritimus; T. m. hainanus; T. m. moi; T. m. monticolus
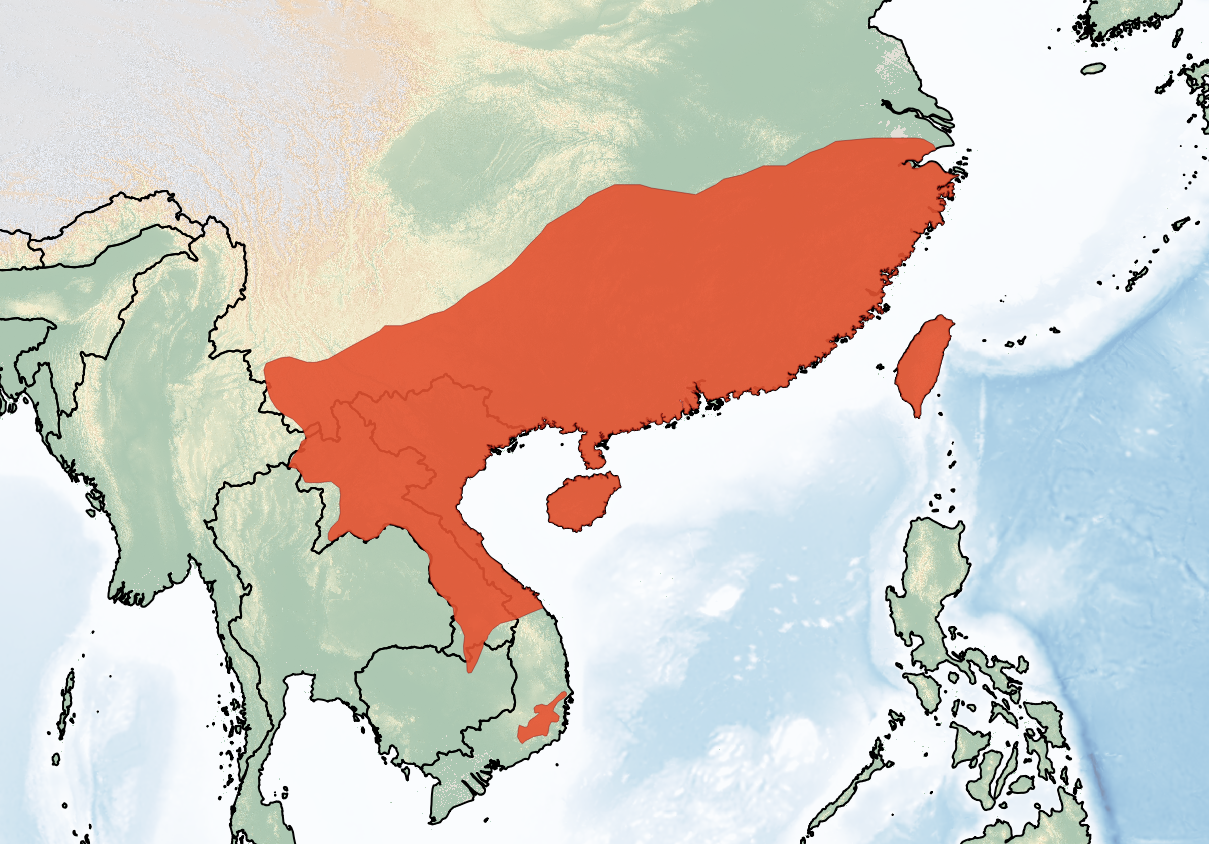

= Maritime striped squirrel =

Species of rodent

The maritime striped squirrel (Tamiops maritimus), also known as eastern striped squirrel, is a species of rodent in the family Sciuridae. It is found in southern and eastern China (including Hainan), Taiwan, and Laos and Vietnam east of the Mekong River. It is diurnal, highly arboreal and feeds on fruits, seeds, insects; in addition its diet includes nectar of ginger (Alpinia kwangsiensis).
