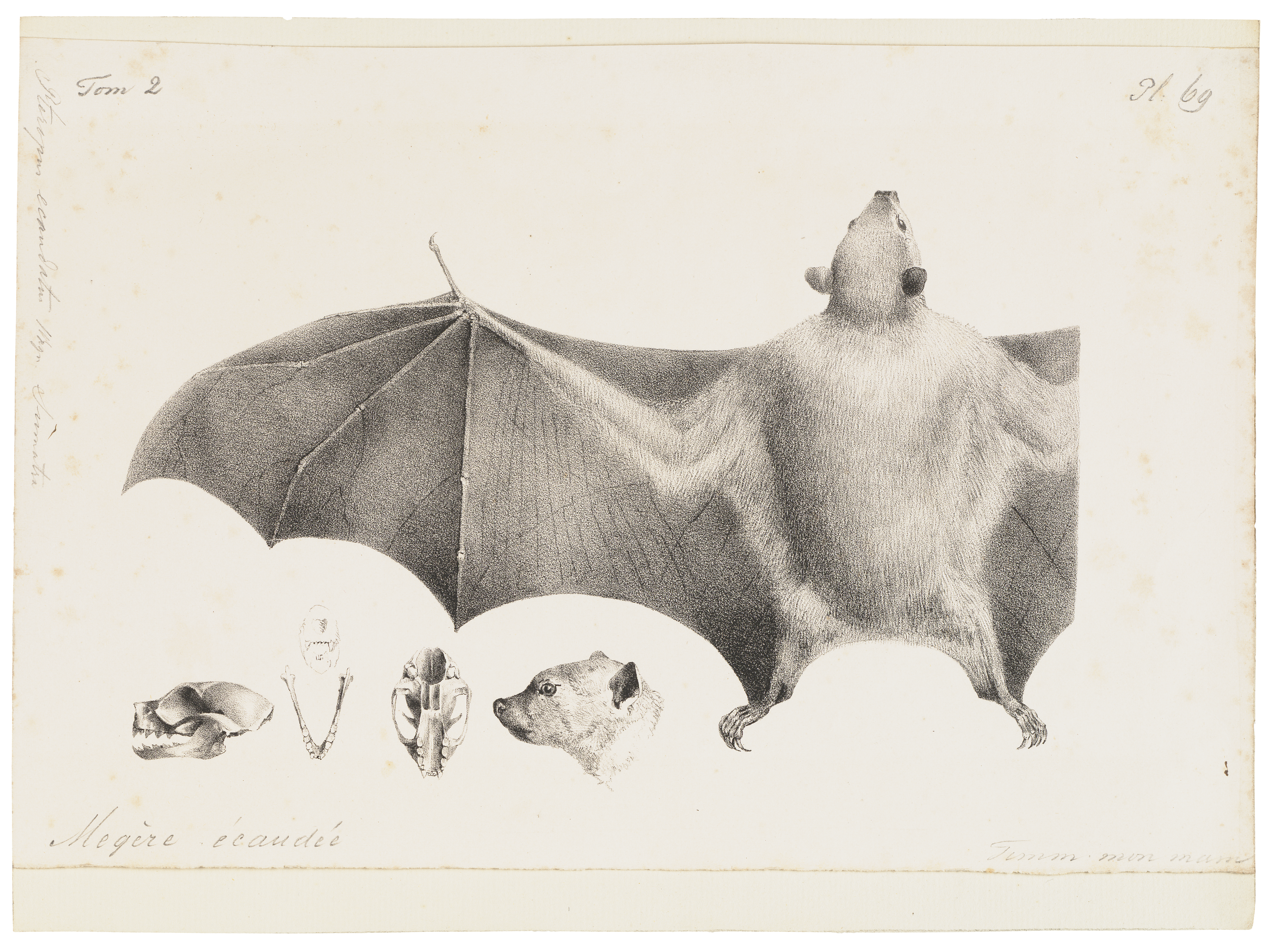

Conservation status
- Least Concern (IUCN 3.1)

Scientific classification
- Kingdom: Animalia
- Phylum: Chordata
- Class: Mammalia
- Order: Chiroptera
- Family: Pteropodidae
- Genus: Megaerops
- Species: M. ecaudatus

Binomial name
- Megaerops ecaudatus (Temminck, 1837)
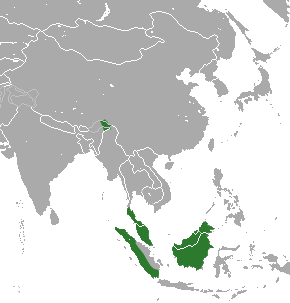
- Tailless fruit bat range

= Tailless fruit bat =

Species of bat

The tailless fruit bat (Megaerops ecaudatus) is a species of fruit bat in the family Pteropodidae.

== Distribution ==
Individuals have been found in the lowland primary forest at Poring in Sabah and Taleban in Thailand, Bario highland and secondary forest of Balui, both in Sarawak. M. ecaudatus ranges in the primary forest and open habitat from Thailand, Vietnam, Peninsular Malaysia, Sumatra; Kinabalu, Danum, Tawau, and Tenom in Sabah; Temburong and Tasik Merimbun in Brunei; Bario in Sarawak; to Kapuas and Kutai in Kalimantan.

== Biology and ecology ==
Two males and two females have been captured in various habitats. An adult female was collected in April, 1995, and adult male in April, 1996. A subadult female was taken from the Balui secondary forest in June, 1994, while an immature was collected from the primary forest in Taleban on 28 March 1997. In Cameron Highlands, Peninsula Malaysia, females were pregnant in February and extending to March and June. Females with suckling juveniles were also observed in November. A specimen MTA96004 was collected in the canopy net approximately 30 m above ground level. The specimen BD013 was collected at 1,100 m elevation in Bario upland. According to Lekagul and McNeely (1977), M. ecaudatus has been recorded both in the lowlands and on mountains up to 3,000 m in Thailand.
