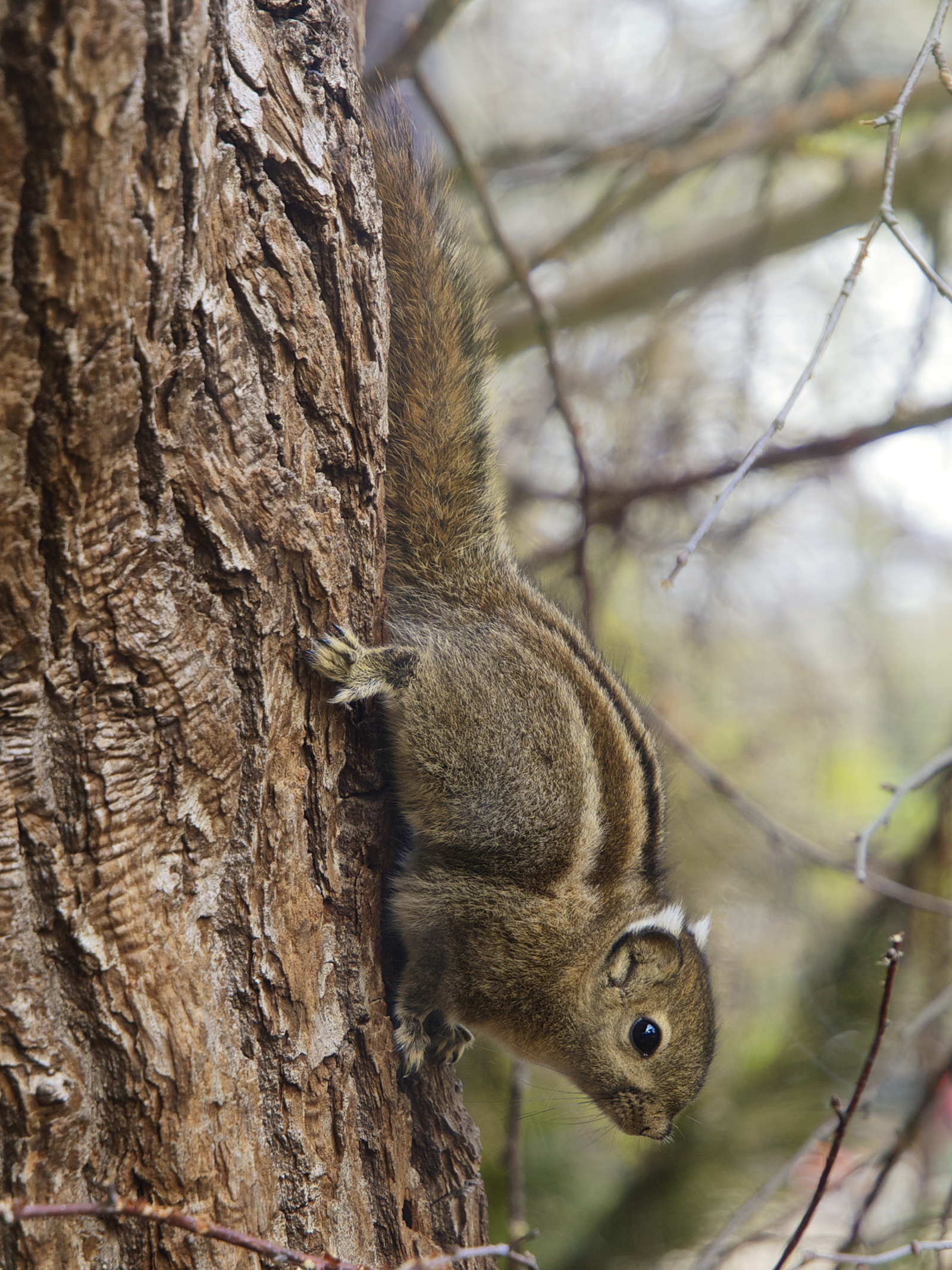

Conservation status
- Least Concern (IUCN 3.1)

Scientific classification
- Kingdom: Animalia
- Phylum: Chordata
- Class: Mammalia
- Order: Rodentia
- Family: Sciuridae
- Genus: Tamiops
- Species: T. swinhoei

Binomial name
- Tamiops swinhoei (A. Milne-Edwards, 1874)

Subspecies
- T. s. swinhoei; T. s. olivaceus; T. s. spencei; T. s. vestitus
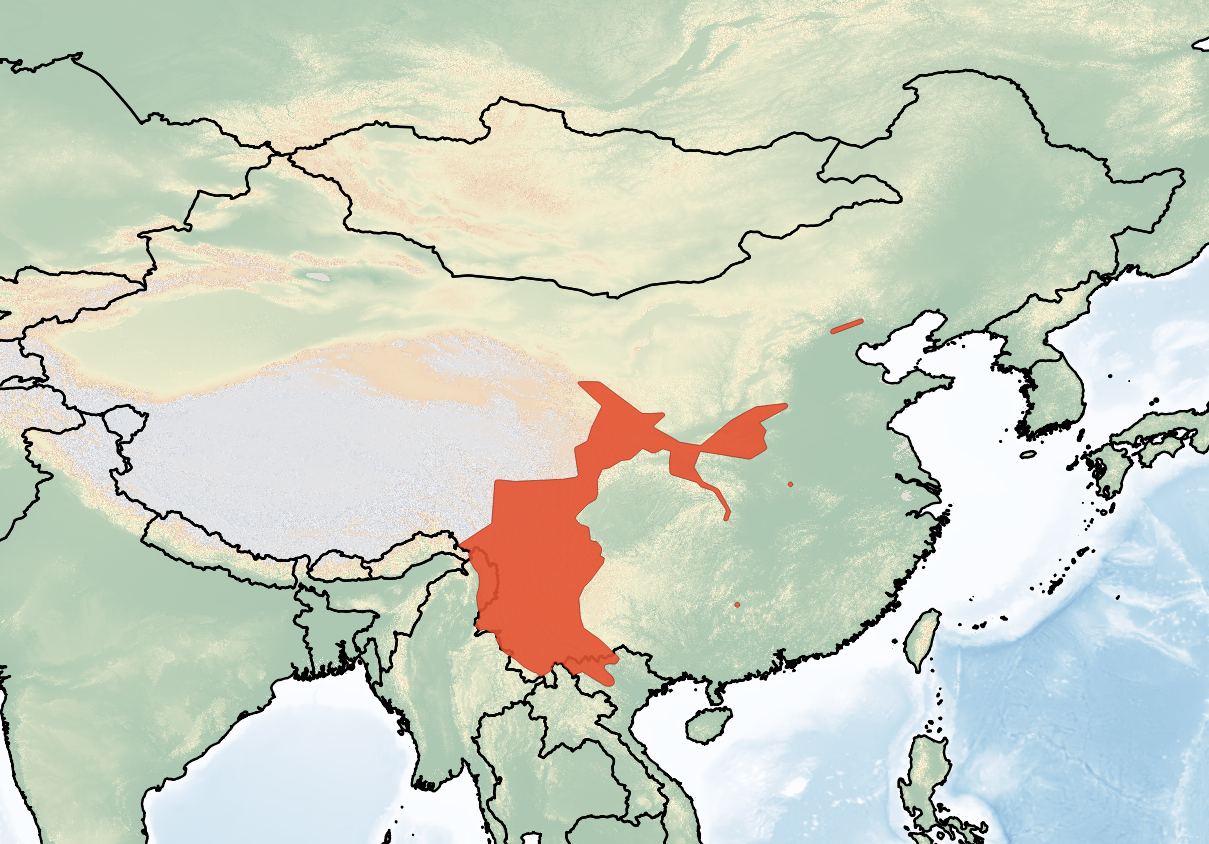

= Swinhoe's striped squirrel =

Species of rodent

Swinhoe's striped squirrel (Tamiops swinhoei) is a small species of rodent in the family Sciuridae. This species is found mostly in China and Southeast Asia. Their diet consists of mostly seeds, fruits, nuts and ginger nectar. Like most squirrels they live in forest areas with mountains, usually in groups. They have litters that average in size of 3.25 offspring.

== Physical features ==
They are small bodied with stripes running from their nose to their neck and a second set that run the length of their body to their tail. The stripes range in color from yellow to brown cinnamon. Small tufts of white fur can be seen on the tips of their ears. They have dense fur to accommodate for the high elevation where they live. Females have a longer tail than males.

== Reproduction ==
Swinhoe's striped squirrels usually breed once every six months. On average they can have 3-6 offspring in a litter.

== Diet ==
Swinhoe's striped squirrel are herbivores. They eat mostly nuts, seeds, fruits, and ginger nectar. They collect their food and store it for later dates when food is scarce. Swinhoe's striped squirrel engages in nectar robbing on several different ginger species. It makes an opening at the base of the petals/corolla to access the nectar.

Swinhoe's striped squirrel also preys on the eggs of cavity-nesting birds.

== Ecosystem contributions ==
Consuming seeds and nuts is helpful to disperse seeds and nuts in order for more to grow. This species of squirrel may be eaten locally by humans.

== Distribution and habitat ==
Swinhoe's striped squirrel is found mostly in Southeast Asia, China, Vietnam, Myanmar, Hainan Island, and possibly Laos. They live in tropical rain forest, where there are many mountains, in mostly couples and groups.
