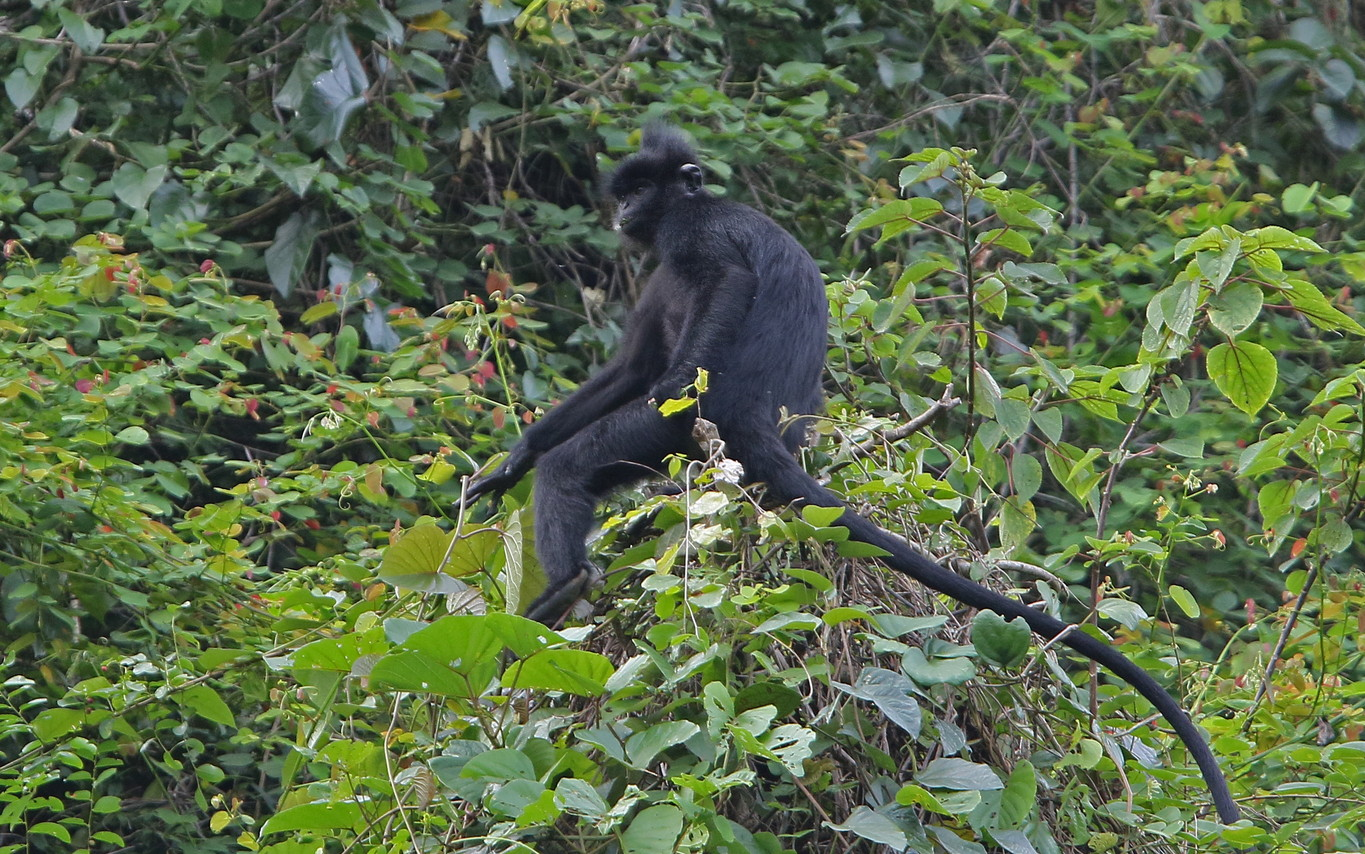

Conservation status
- Endangered (IUCN 3.1)

Scientific classification
- Kingdom: Animalia
- Phylum: Chordata
- Class: Mammalia
- Infraclass: Placentalia
- Order: Primates
- Family: Cercopithecidae
- Genus: Trachypithecus
- Species group: Trachypithecus francoisi group
- Species: T. hatinhensis

Binomial name
- Trachypithecus hatinhensis (Dao, 1970)
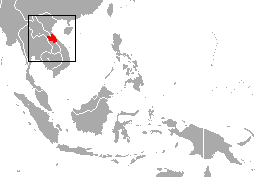
- Hatinh Langur range

= Hatinh langur =

Species of Old World monkey

The Hatinh langur (Trachypithecus hatinhensis) is a highly threatened Old World monkey found in limestone forests in Vietnam, primarily in the Quảng Bình Province. They are a primarily black, arboreal, and diurnal monkey. They occupy dense forests which contribute to their decline as a result of habitat fragmentation. They're also subject to hunting from humans which further contributes to their endangered status.

== Taxonomy and morphological details ==
Adults of the Hatinh langur are almost entirely black at adulthood, besides a slight dark brown hint, while newborns have yellow fur. Adults feature white coloration on the cheeks that extends past the ears and tapers down the neck. This white coloration fluctuates from a bright white to a smoky grey. Female Hatinh langurs possess light colored hairs in the pubic area, which remains the typical way to determine sex in the field.

The Hatinh langur has often been considered a subspecies of the François' langur, but they were elevated to a full species status by Bradon-Jones in 1995. Species status was later confirmed by Groves, 2005. They have also been listed as a subspecies and genetic work suggests they should be considered a subspecies of the Laotian langur (T. laotum). Morphological and genetic data also suggests the Indochinese black langur (T. ebenus) is a morph of the Hatinh langur.

== Habitat ==
Hatinh langurs inhabit the steep limestone cliffs of Central Vietnam and Southern Laos, prompting them to be referred to as the "Limestone Langur". A recent survey discovered a small population living in the Quảng Trị Province. Contrary to their name, they are not known from the Hà Tĩnh Province. The local Van Kieu minority refer to this monkey as the 'Con Cung', which roughly translates as "black, cliff-dwelling monkey with a long tail".

They primarily occupy dense forests, but venture into open areas to forage on occasion. This species is known to sleep in caves and crevices in the limestone cliffs consistently for many years, unless disturbed by humans. The preferred height for sleeping locations is 20 meters from the cliff base, but they can be up to 50 meters off the ground. Their intense preference for these limestone cliffs may be an effect of widespread habitat loss.

== Behavior ==
While groups of up to 30 individuals have been recognized, the usual group size consists of two to 15 individuals. These groups consist of a single male, along with multiple females, and the offspring. The lifespan of the Hatinh langur is observed to be an average of 12 years. Although births peak in the warmer months when food is more abundant, females will give birth year round to a single offspring at a time. The gestation period is 180-190 days. Their diet was reported to consist of 81% leaves, 9% fruits, 9% vines, and 1% flowers based on a single study.

The Hatinh langur is diurnal, leaving their caves at dawn and return early in the afternoon. As they move to and from their sleeping site, the group follows the dominant animal in a single file line down the rock face or aerial tree root. When they return to their sleeping site, they can be seen resting and playing before dusk until the dominant individual makes a "huut…huut" sound signaling the group to enter their caves. These animals will sleep alone, in pairs, or in groups of three, but as a whole, the group does not share a single cave. This "huut…huut" call will also be used by the dominant male when danger or unusual circumstances arise. Other types of calls include whoops and grunts; the former composed of a single exhalation, and the latter formed by a long inhalation-exhalation interval.

== Threats ==
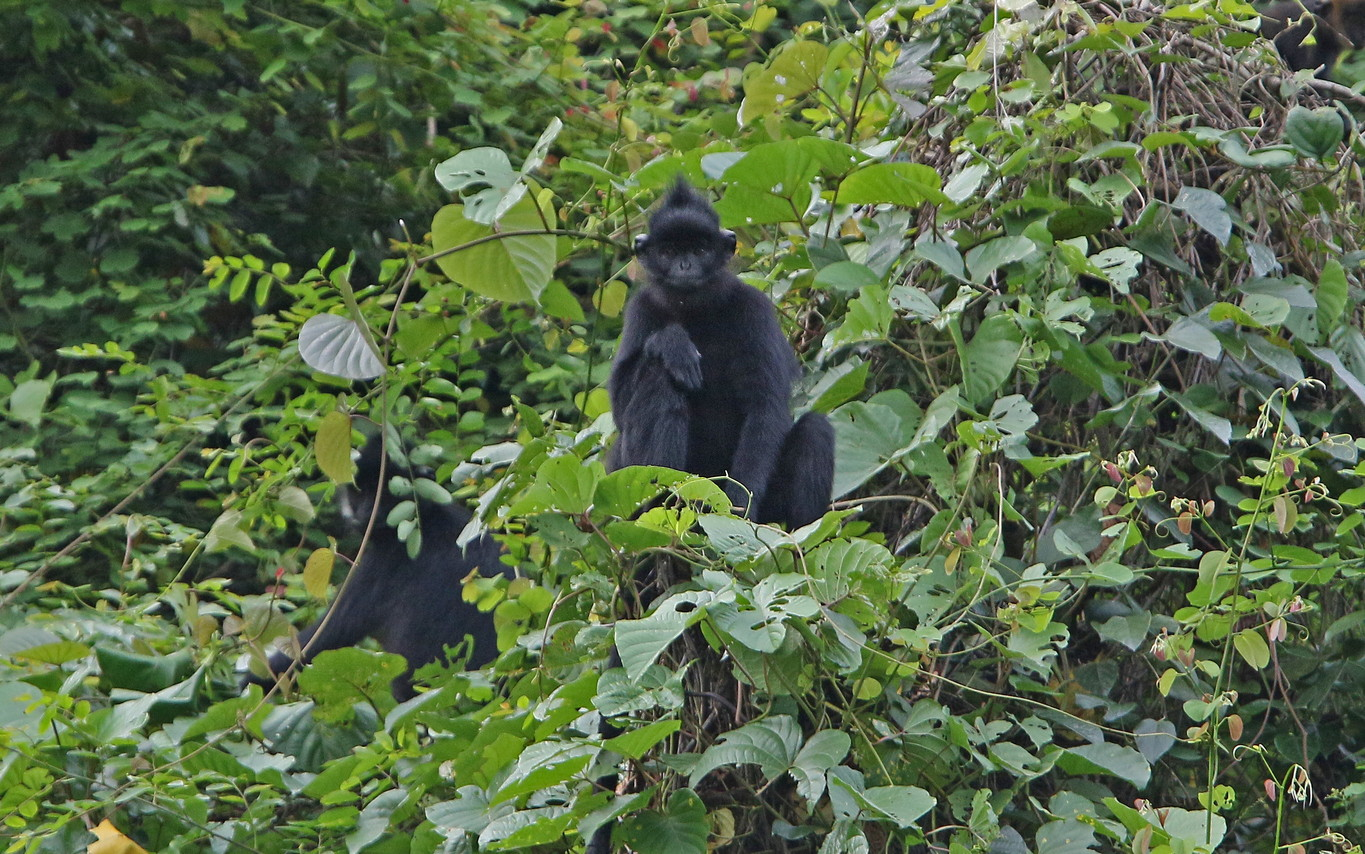
Photograph by Christoph Moning

The Hatinh langur is labeled as an endangered and decreasing species, with populations that are considered severely fragmented and in decline with regard to mature individuals. In many regions, they are hunted for both meat and medicine. They are hunted primarily for their use as an ingredient to create "Cao Khi," a medicine. While hunting is illegal, due to their regular sleeping locations, they are regarded as easy prey. Hunting via rifles has diminished as a result of increased gun laws, leading to snaring as the dominant method for hunting.

As the Hatinh langur relies on limestone forests, deforestation poses another threat. Within the districts that the langur inhabit, 90% of the total humid primary forest area were lost to deforestation between 2002 and 2019. New construction and forest clearance have resulted in habitat fragmentation, which makes dispersal increasingly difficult, and raises concerns of decline in population sizes resulting in loss of genetic diversity due to genetic drift and inbreeding. Habitat destruction, also facilitates the ease of hunting.

== Scientific importance ==
The Hatinh langur is used in neuroscience research to assess the evolutionary background of primate brain function. Humans exhibit right-handedness as a result of the left hemisphere's specialization for functionality. It was determined that while individual Hatinh langurs exhibit hand preference, these results do not extrapolate to a lateralization across the species.
