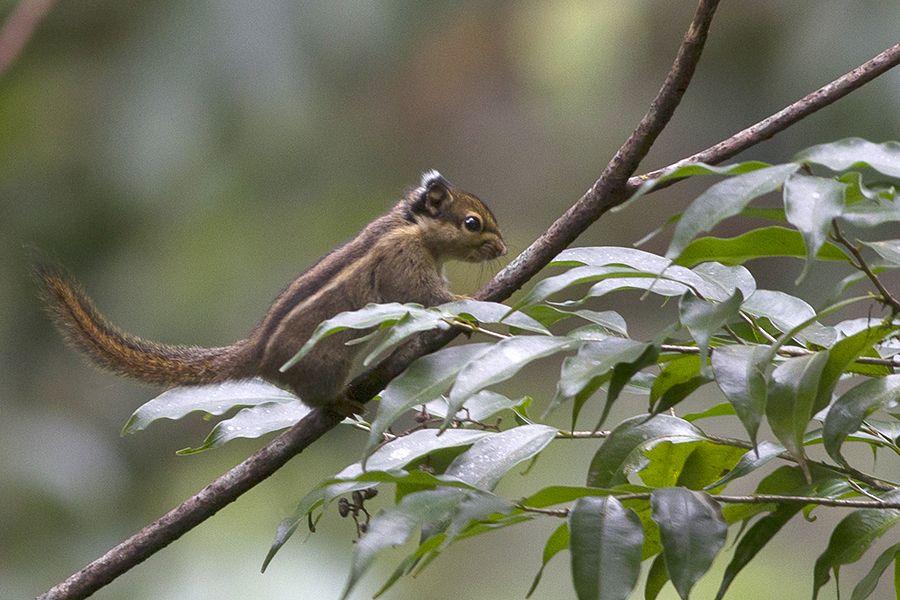
- From Khangchendzonga National Park, West Sikkim, India

Conservation status
- Least Concern (IUCN 3.1)

Scientific classification
- Kingdom: Animalia
- Phylum: Chordata
- Class: Mammalia
- Infraclass: Placentalia
- Order: Rodentia
- Family: Sciuridae
- Genus: Tamiops
- Species: T. mcclellandii

Binomial name
- Tamiops mcclellandii (Horsfield, 1840)

Subspecies
- T. m. mcclellandii (Horsfield, 1840); T. m. barbei (Blyth, 1847); T. m. collinus Moore, 1958; T. m. inconstans Thomas, 1920; T. m. kongensis (Bonhote, 1901); T. m. leucotis (Temminck, 1853
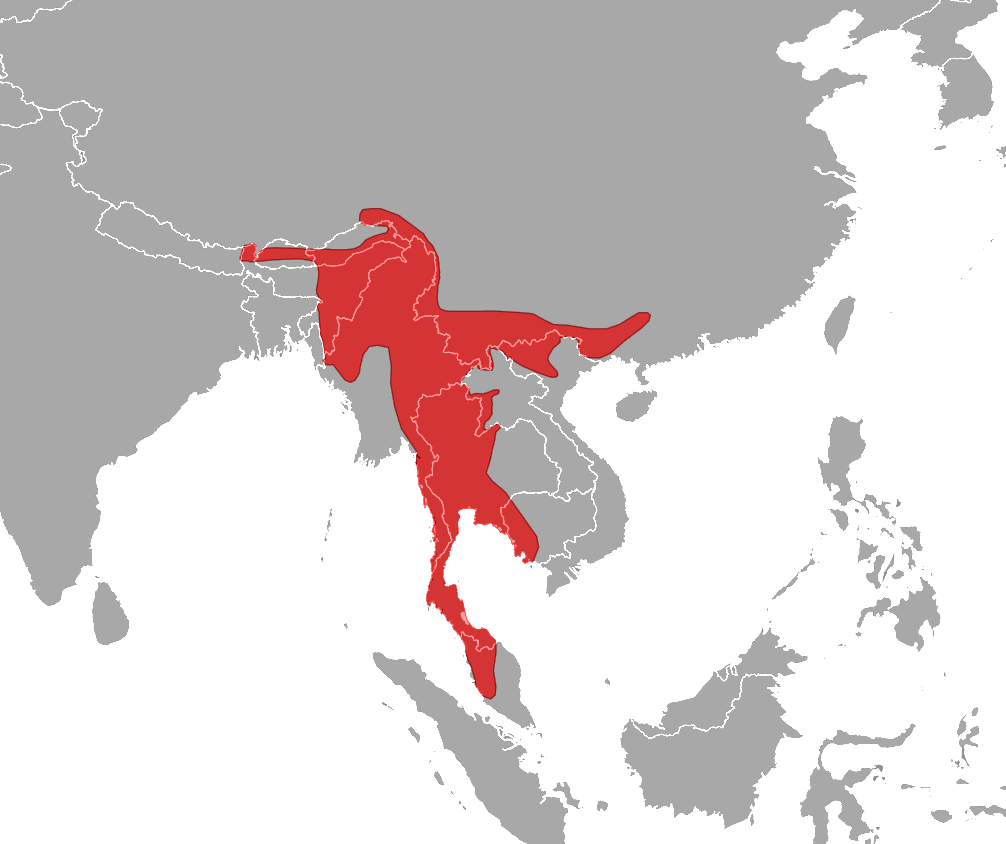
- resident range

Synonyms
- ? macclellandi Horsfield, 1840; Tamiops macclellandi (Horsfield, 1840); Tamiops macclellandi subsp. (error)

= Himalayan striped squirrel =

Species of rodent

The Himalayan striped squirrel (Tamiops mcclellandii), also known as western striped squirrel or Burmese striped squirrel, is a species of rodent in the family Sciuridae.

== Habitation and distribution ==
It lives in a variety of forest from tropical to subtropical in Bhutan, Cambodia, China, India, Laos, Malaysia, Myanmar, Nepal, Thailand, and Vietnam. This species is diurnal, arboreal and feeds on fruit, vegetable matter, and insects. It often seen in small groups and uses tree holes for shelter.

== Species ==
The rapid uplift of the Himalayas is believed to have caused the diversification of the three main Tamiops lineages. Multiple divergences from 5.8 to 1.7 mya likely led to the formation of modern Tamiops species.

== Gallery ==
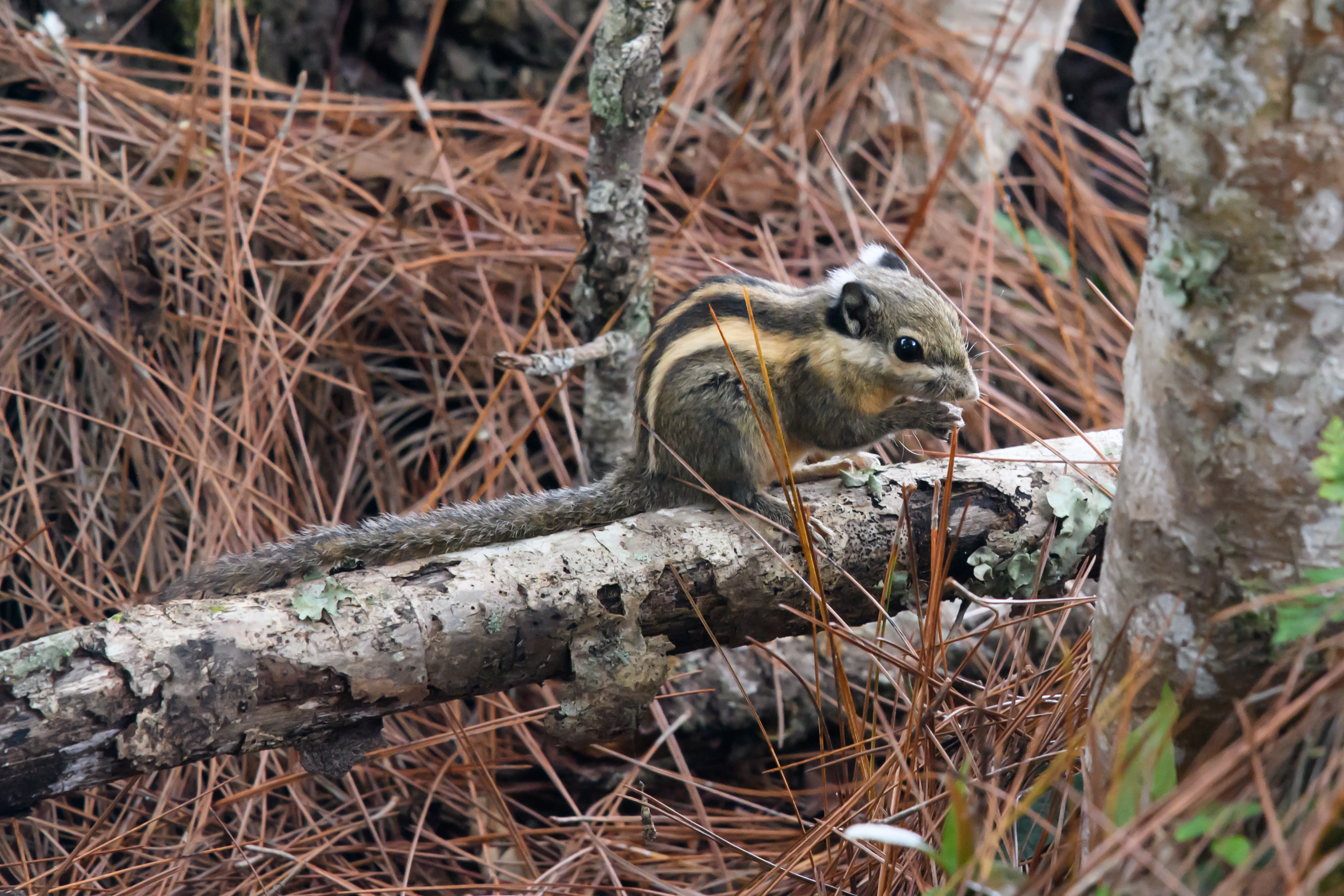
Tamiops mcclellandii in Phu Kradueng National Park, Thailand
