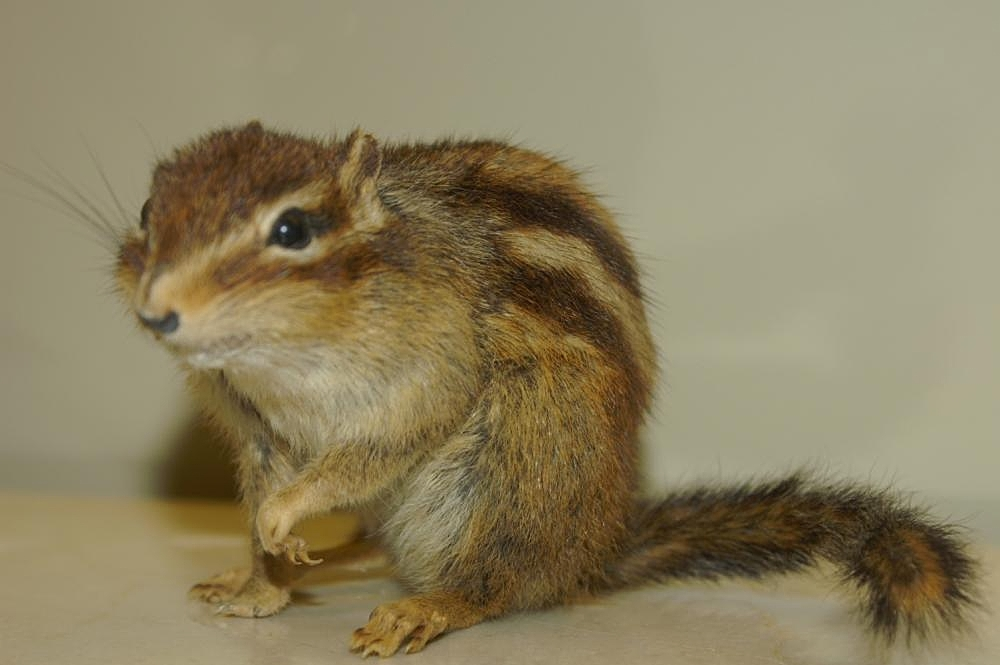

Conservation status
- Least Concern (IUCN 3.1)

Scientific classification
- Kingdom: Animalia
- Phylum: Chordata
- Class: Mammalia
- Infraclass: Placentalia
- Order: Rodentia
- Family: Sciuridae
- Genus: Tamiops
- Species: T. rodolphii

Binomial name
- Tamiops rodolphii (A. Milne-Edwards, 1867)

Subspecies
- T. r. rodolphii; T. r. elbeli
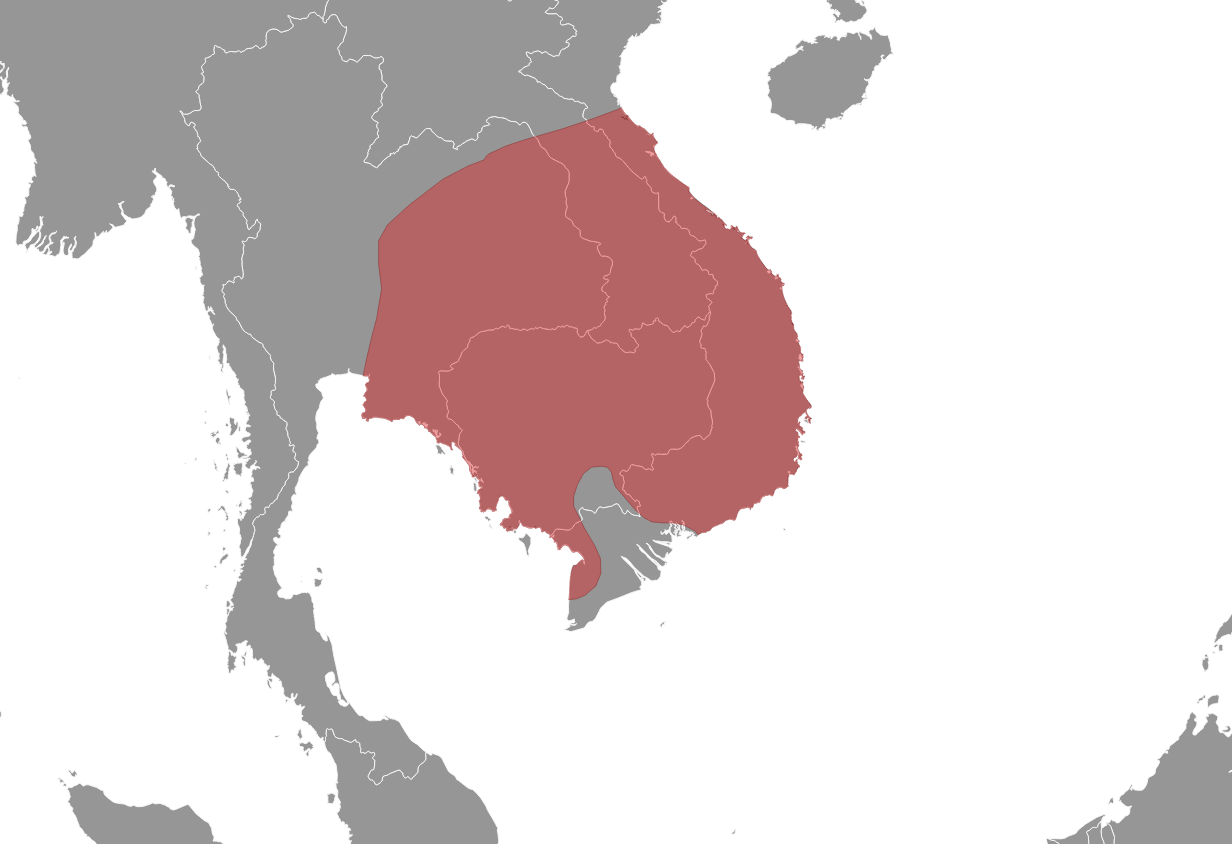

= Cambodian striped squirrel =

Species of rodent

The Cambodian striped squirrel (Tamiops rodolphii) is a species of rodent in the family Sciuridae. It is found in eastern Thailand, Cambodia, southern Laos, and southern Vietnam.

== Appearance ==
Males and females look almost the same. They have the same body size, fur color, and stripe patterns. Therefore, one cannot easily tell between males and females just by looking at them. This also means that there is no sexual dimorphism. Additionally, compared to other squirrel species, the Cambodian squirrel does not significantly change colors during different seasons. This means the Cambodian striped squirrel will have short light brown fur throughout the seasons with black and light stripes covering their back and heads.

== Habitat ==
The Cambodian Striped Squirrel inhabits tropical forests, shrublands, and rural gardens. They are usually found in the understory and lower canopy of the forests. While their elevation range has not been reported, its closely related species, Tamiops macclellandi, has been found 1,500 meters above sea level.

== Behavior ==
One of the Cambodian striped squirrel's more unusual behaviors is how it acts as a bark gleaner by foraging for food by searching across the vertical bark surfaces of trees. They are omnivores and along with tree bark, they also consume flowers, insects, and seeds. It is relatively uncommon across the squirrel family and especially so without abducted limb adaptations.

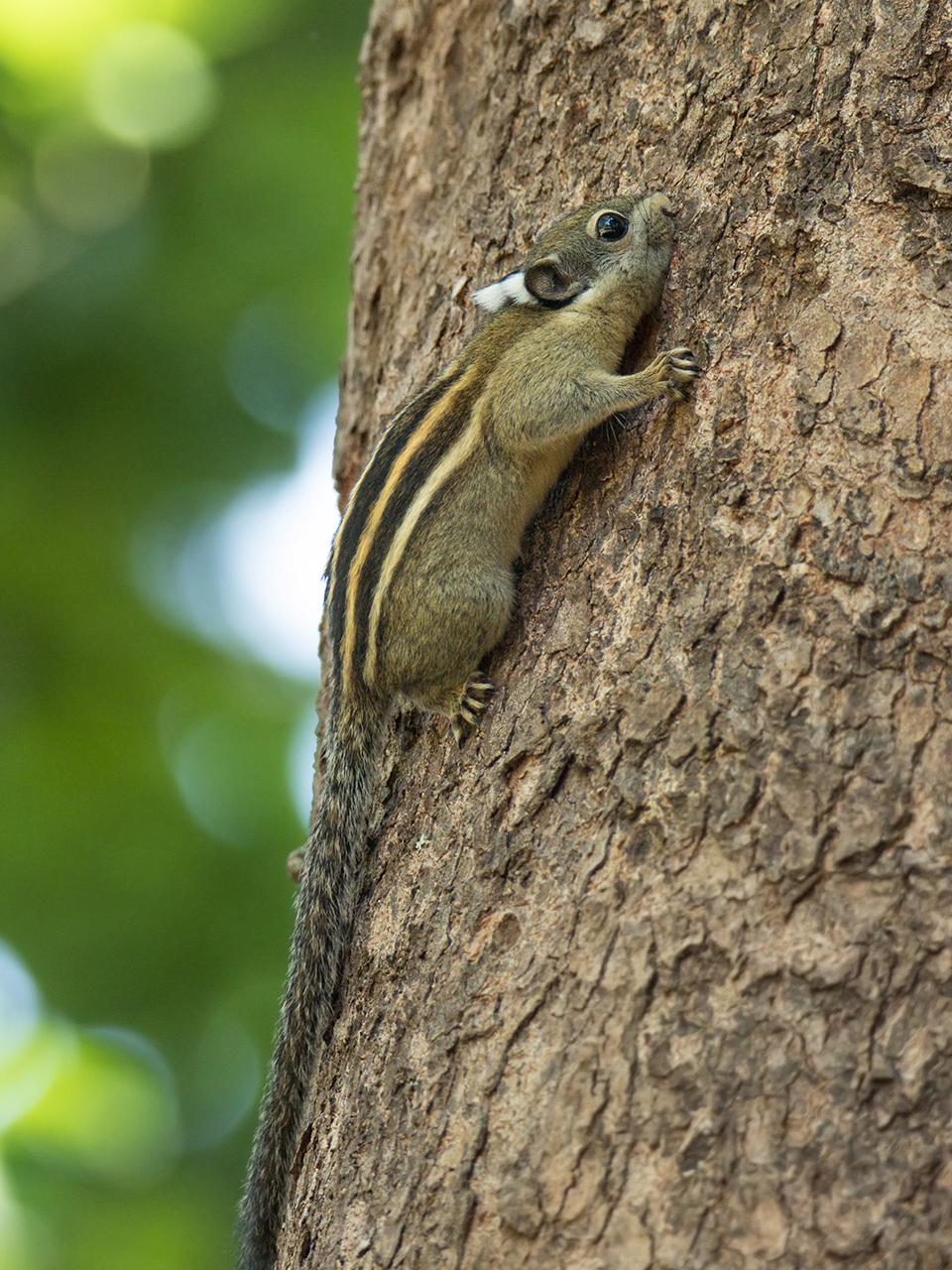
A Cambodian striped squirrel forages for tree bark.

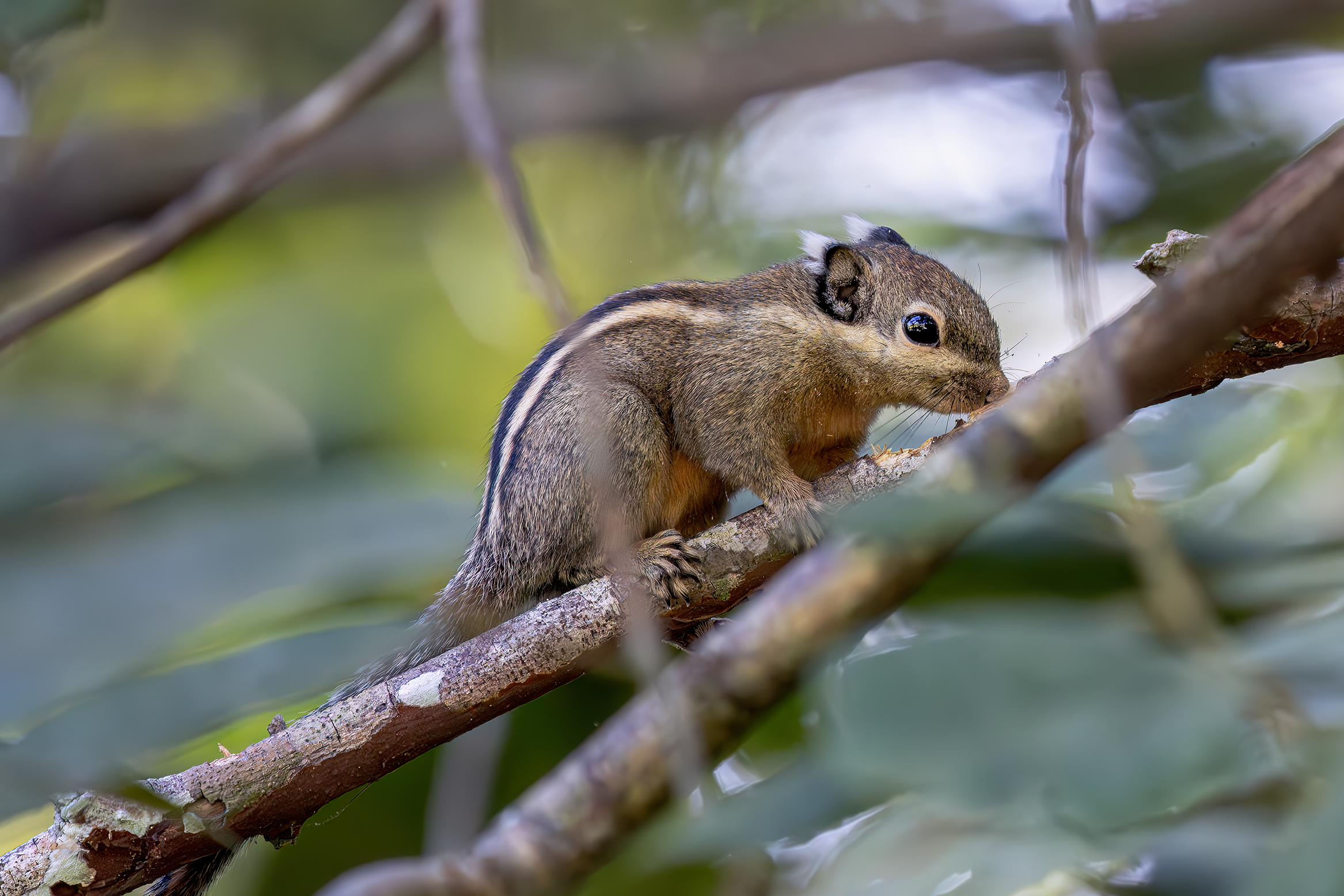
Cambodian striped squirrel in Cat Tien National Park, Vietnam. (James Hunt)

== Related Species ==
The Himalayan striped squirrel (T. macclellandi) is one of the closest related species to the Cambodian striped squirrel. One of the main differences between the Himalayan and the Cambodian striped squirrels is that the Himalayan striped squirrels are found in a larger geographic area. While the Cambodian striped squirrel is found in eastern Thailand, Cambodia, southern Laos, and southern Vietnam, the Himalayan striped squirrel can also be found in China, India, Bhutan, Malaysia, Myanmar, and Nepal.

== Unique Characteristics ==
Cambodian striped squirrels are endothermic, which means they can keep their body warm on their own. Their bodies also have bilateral symmetry, meaning the left and right sides look the same.
