= List of mammals of Myanmar =

This is a list of the mammal species recorded in Myanmar.

== Order: Artiodactyla (even-toed ungulates & cetaceans) ==
Image	Common name	Scientific name Authority	Preferred habitat	IUCN status	Range
Family Bovidae: cattle, antelope, sheep, goats
	Gaur	Bos gaurus Smith, 1827	Forest, grassland, shrubland, & savanna	VU^{IUCN} ▼	
	Banteng	Bos javanicus d'Alton, 1823	Forest & grassland	EN^{IUCN} ▼	
	Wild water buffalo	Bubalus arnee Kerr, 1792	Wetlands, grasslands, and riparian forests	EN^{IUCN} ▼	
	Takin	Budorcas taxicolor Hodgson, 1850	Forest, shrubland, & grassland	VU^{IUCN} ▼	
	Red serow	Capricornis rubidus Blyth, 1863	Rocky areas & montane forest	VU^{IUCN} ▼	
	Mainland serow	Capricornis sumatraensis Bechstein, 1799	Forested mountain slopes	VU^{IUCN} ▼	
	Red goral	Naemorhedus baileyi Pocock, 1914	Forest and rocky areas, 2000-4500 m	VU^{IUCN} ▼	
	Chinese goral	Naemorhedus griseus A. Milne-Edwards, 1871			
	Bharal	Pseudois nayaur Hodgson, 1833	High mountains	LC^{IUCN} Unknown	
Family Moschidae: musk deer
	Black musk deer	Moschus fuscus Li, 1981	Near the tree line in high mountains	EN^{IUCN} ▼	
Family Tragulidae: mouse-deer
	Lesser mouse-deer	Tragulus kanchil Raffles, 1821	Lowland forests	LC^{IUCN} Unknown	
	Greater mouse-deer	Tragulus napu F. Cuvier, 1822	Lowland forests	LC^{IUCN} Unknown	
Family Cervidae: deer
	Fea's muntjac	Muntiacus feae Kerr, 1792	Evergreen forest	DD^{IUCN} Unknown	
	Gongshan muntjac	Muntiacus gongshanensis Ma, 1990	High mountains	DD^{IUCN} ▼	
	Leaf muntjac	Muntiacus putaoensis Amato, Egan & Rabinowitz, 1999	Forest	DD^{IUCN} ▼	
	Indian muntjac	Muntiacus vaginalis Zimmermann, 1780	Wide variety of forests & scrublands	LC^{IUCN} ▼	
	Eld's deer	Rucervus eldii McClelland, 1842	Grasslands	EN^{IUCN} ▼	
	Sambar deer	Rusa unicolor Kerr, 1792	Wide variety of forest & savanna	VU^{IUCN} ▼	
Family Suidae: pigs
	Wild boar	Sus scrofa Linnaeus, 1758	Wide variety of habitats	LC^{IUCN} Unknown	
Family Balaenopteridae: rorquals
	Common minke whale	Balaenoptera acutorostrata Lacépède, 1804	Neritic & oceanic marine zones	LC^{IUCN} Unknown	
	Bryde's whale	Balaenoptera edeni Anderson, 1879	Neritic & oceanic marine zones	LC^{IUCN} Unknown	
	Blue whale	Balaenoptera musculus Linnaeus, 1758	Neritic & oceanic marine zones	EN^{IUCN} ▲	
	Fin whale	Balaenoptera physalus Linnaeus, 1758	Neritic & oceanic marine zones	VU^{IUCN} ▲	
	Humpback whale	Megaptera novaeangliae Borowski, 1781	Neritic & oceanic marine zones	LC^{IUCN} ▲	
Family Phocoenidae: porpoises
	Indo-Pacific finless porpoise	Neophocaena phocaenoides G. Cuvier, 1829	Coastal waters	VU^{IUCN} ▼	
Family Delphinidae: marine dolphins
	Common dolphin	Delphinus delphis Linnaeus, 1758	Neritic & oceanic marine zones	LC^{IUCN} Unknown	
	Pygmy killer whale	Feresa attenuata J. E. Gray, 1874	Oceanic marine zone	LC^{IUCN} Unknown	
	Short-finned pilot whale	Globicephala macrorhynchus Gray, 1846	Oceanic marine zone	LC^{IUCN} Unknown	
	Risso's dolphin	Grampus griseus G. Cuvier, 1812	Oceanic marine zone	LC^{IUCN} Unknown	
	Fraser's dolphin	Lagenodelphis hosei Fraser, 1956	Neritic & oceanic marine zones	LC^{IUCN} Unknown	
	Irrawaddy dolphin	Orcaella brevirostris Owen in Gray, 1866	Coastal waters & rivers	EN^{IUCN} ▼	
	Orca	Orcinus orca Linnaeus, 1758	Neritic & oceanic marine zones	DD^{IUCN} Unknown	
	Melon-headed whale	Peponocephala electra Gray, 1846	Oceanic marine zone	LC^{IUCN} Unknown	
	False killer whale	Pseudorca crassidens Owen, 1846	Neritic & oceanic marine zones	NT^{IUCN} Unknown	
	Indo-Pacific humpback dolphin	Sousa chinensis Osbeck, 1765	Coastal waters	VU^{IUCN} ▼	
	Pantropical spotted dolphin	Stenella attenuata Gray, 1846	Neritic & oceanic marine zones	LC^{IUCN} Unknown	
	Striped dolphin	Stenella coeruleoalba Meyen, 1833	Neritic & oceanic marine zones	LC^{IUCN} Unknown	
	Spinner dolphin	Stenella longirostris Gray, 1828	Neritic & oceanic marine zones	LC^{IUCN} Unknown	
	Rough-toothed dolphin	Steno bredanensis G. Cuvier in Lesson, 1828	Neritic & oceanic marine zones	LC^{IUCN} Unknown	
	Common bottlenose dolphin	Tursiops truncatus Montagu, 1821	Coastal, neritic & oceanic marine zones	LC^{IUCN} Unknown	
	Indo-Pacific bottlenose dolphin	Tursiops aduncus Ehrenberg, 1833	Neritic & oceanic marine zones	NT^{IUCN} Unknown	
Family Physeteridae
	Sperm whale	Physeter macrocephalus Linnaeus, 1758	Neritic & oceanic marine zones	VU^{IUCN} Unknown	
Family Kogiidae
	Pygmy sperm whale	Kogia breviceps Blainville, 1838	Oceanic marine zone	LC^{IUCN} Unknown	
	Dwarf sperm whale	Kogia sima Owen, 1866	Oceanic marine zone	LC^{IUCN} Unknown	
Family Ziphidae
	Tropical bottlenose whale	Indopacetus pacificus Longman, 1926	Oceanic marine zone	LC^{IUCN} Unknown	
	Blainville's beaked whale	Mesoplodon densirostris Blainville, 1817	Oceanic marine zone	LC^{IUCN} Unknown	
	Ginkgo-toothed beaked whale	Mesoplodon ginkgodens Nishiwaki and Kamiya, 1958	Oceanic marine zone	DD^{IUCN} Unknown	
	Cuvier's beaked whale	Ziphius cavirostris Cuvier, 1823	Oceanic marine zone	LC^{IUCN} Unknown	

== Order: Carnivora (carnivorans) ==
Image	Common name	Scientific name Authority	Preferred habitat	IUCN status	Range
Family Felidae: cats
	Asian golden cat	Catopuma temminckii Vigors & Horsfield, 1827	Forest, savanna, shrubland, & grassland	NT^{IUCN} ▼	
	Jungle cat	Felis chaus Schreber, 1777	Particularly around wetlands	LC^{IUCN} ▼	
	Eurasian lynx	Lynx lynx Linnaeus, 1758	Far north of country	LC^{IUCN}	
	Clouded leopard	Neofelis nebulosa Griffith, 1821	Forest & shrubland	VU^{IUCN} ▼	
	Leopard	Panthera pardus Linnaeus, 1758	Wide range of habitats	VU^{IUCN} ▼	
	Tiger	Panthera tigris Linnaeus, 1758	Generalists but especially forests	EN^{IUCN} ▼	
	Marbled cat	Pardofelis marmorata Martin, 1836	Forest	NT^{IUCN} ▼	
	Leopard cat	Prionailurus bengalensis Kerr, 1792	Forest, shrublands, & grasslands	LC^{IUCN}	
	Fishing cat	Prionailurus viverrinus Bennett, 1833	Marshlands & near waterbodies	VU^{IUCN} ▼	
Family Viverridae
	Binturong	Arctictis binturong Raffles, 1822	Forest (arboreal)	VU^{IUCN} ▼	
	Small-toothed palm civet	Arctogalidia trivirgata Gray, 1832	Evergreen & semi-evergreen forest	LC^{IUCN} ▼	
	Banded palm civet	Hemigalus derbyanus Gray, 1837	Forest	NT^{IUCN} ▼	
	Masked palm civet	Paguma larvata Smith, 1827	Mainly evergreen and semi-evergreen forest	LC^{IUCN} ▼	
	Asian palm civet	Paradoxurus hermaphroditus Pallas, 1777	Wide range of forest, plantation, and urban environments	LC^{IUCN} ▼	
	Large-spotted civet	Viverra megaspila Blyth, 1862	Lowland forest	EN^{IUCN} ▼	
	Large Indian civet	Viverra zibetha Linnaeus, 1758	Forests & shrublands	LC^{IUCN} ▼	
	Small Indian civet	Viverricula indica Geoffroy Saint-Hilaire, 1803	Wide range of forests & wetlands	LC^{IUCN}	
Family Prionodontidae: linsangs
	Banded linsang	Prionodon linsang Hardwicke, 1821	Evergreen forest	LC^{IUCN} ▼	
	Spotted linsang	Prionodon pardicolor Hodgson, 1842	Forest, shrubland, and grassland	LC^{IUCN} ▼	
Family Herpestidae: mongooses
	Small Indian mongoose	Urva auropunctata Hodgson, 1836	Forest & scrublands	LC^{IUCN} Unknown	
	Javan mongoose	Urva javanica É. Geoffroy Saint-Hilaire, 1818	Widespread in lowlands, including anthropogenic habitats	LC^{IUCN} Unknown	
	Crab-eating Mongoose	Urva urva Hodgson, 1836	Widespread	LC^{IUCN} ▼	
Family Canidae: dogs, foxes
	Dhole	Cuon alpinus Pallas, 1811	Forest, shrubland, & grassland	EN^{IUCN} ▼	
	Golden jackal	Canis aureus Linnaeus, 1758	Wide variety, especially lowland deciduous dipterocarp forest	LC^{IUCN} ▲	
	Wolf	Canis lupus Linnaeus, 1758	Far north of country	LC^{IUCN}	
	Red fox	Vulpes vulpes Linnaeus, 1758	Wide variety of habitats	LC^{IUCN}	
Family Ursidae: bears
	Sun bear	Helarctos malayanus Raffles, 1821	Forest & shrubland	VU^{IUCN} ▼	
	Asian black bear	Ursus thibetanus G. Cuvier, 1823	Forest & shrubland	VU^{IUCN} ▼	
Family Ailuridae
	Red panda	Ailurus fulgens F. Cuvier, 1825	Montane forests	EN^{IUCN} ▼	
Family Mustelidae: mustelids
	Asian small-clawed otter	Aonyx cinereus Illiger, 1815	Wetland systems	VU^{IUCN} ▼	
	Greater hog badger	Arctonyx collaris Cuvier, 1825	Mainly forest	VU^{IUCN} ▼	
	Eurasian otter	Lutra lutra Linnaeus, 1758	Wide range of aquatic habitats	NT^{IUCN} ▼	
	Hairy-nosed otter	Lutra sumatrana Gray, 1865	Wide range of aquatic habitats	EN^{IUCN} ▼	
	Smooth-coated otter	Lutrogale perspicillata Geoffroy Saint Hilaire, 1826	Wide range of aquatic habitats, including flooded ricefields	VU^{IUCN} ▼	
	Yellow-throated marten	Martes flavigula Boddaert, 1785	Forests & shrublands	LC^{IUCN} ▼	
	Chinese ferret-badger	Melogale moschata Gray, 1831	Forests & cropland	LC^{IUCN}	
	Burmese ferret-badger	Melogale personata I. Geoffroy Saint-Hilaire, 1831	Forests, shrublands, & grasslands	LC^{IUCN} Unknown	
	Yellow-bellied weasel	Mustela kathiah Hodgson, 1835	Rugged highlands	LC^{IUCN}	
	Siberian weasel	Mustela sibirica Pallas, 1773	Rocky areas in far north	LC^{IUCN}	
	Back-striped weasel	Mustela strigidorsa Gray, 1853	Mountainous evergreen forest	LC^{IUCN}	

== Order: Chiroptera (bats) ==
Image	Common name	Scientific name Authority	Preferred habitat	IUCN status	Range
Family Pteropodidae: flying foxes, Old World fruit bats
	Lesser short-nosed fruit bat	Cynopterus brachyotis Müller, 1838	Forest	LC^{IUCN} Unknown	
	Greater short-nosed fruit bat	Cynopterus sphinx Vahl, 1797	Forest	LC^{IUCN} ▲	
	Cave nectar bat	Eonycteris spelaea Dobson, 1871	Caves & forest	LC^{IUCN} ▼	
	Long-tongued fruit bat	Macroglossus sobrinus K. Andersen, 1911	Forest	LC^{IUCN}	
	Andersen's flying fox	Pteropus intermedius K. Andersen, 1908	Known from two locations in Mon State	DD^{IUCN} Unknown	
	Small flying fox	Pteropus hypomelanus Temminck, 1853	Forest	NT^{IUCN} ▼	
	Indian flying fox	Pteropus medius Temminck, 1825	Forest	LC^{IUCN} ▼	
	Large flying fox	Pteropus vampyrus Linnaeus, 1758	Forest	NT^{IUCN} ▼	
	Geoffroy's rousette	Rousettus amplexicaudatus É. Geoffroy, 1810	Caves, rocky areas, & forests	LC^{IUCN} Unknown	
	Leschenault's rousette	Rousettus leschenaultii Desmarest, 1820	Caves & forests	NT^{IUCN} ▼	
	Blanford's fruit bat	Sphaerias blanfordi Thomas, 1891	Bamboo forest	LC^{IUCN}	
Family Vespertilionidae
	Bronze sprite	Arielulus circumdatus Temminck, 1840	Montane forest	LC^{IUCN} Unknown	
	Oriental serotine	Eptesicus pachyomus Tomes, 1857	Wide variety of habitats	LC^{IUCN} Unknown	
	Thick-eared bat	Eptesicus pachyotis Dobson, 1871	Forest	LC^{IUCN} Unknown	
	Disk-footed bat	Eudiscopus denticulus Conisbee, 1953	Forest	LC^{IUCN} Unknown	
	Common thick-thumbed bat	Glischropus tylopus Dobson, 1875	Forest	LC^{IUCN}	
	Lesser hairy-winged bat	Harpiocephalus harpia Temminck C. J., 1840	Forest	LC^{IUCN} ▼	
	Blanford's bat	Hesperoptenus blanfordi Dobson, 1877	Caves & forests	LC^{IUCN} Unknown	
	Tickell's bat	Hesperoptenus tickelli Blyth, 1851	Caves & forests	LC^{IUCN} Unknown	
	Chocolate pipistrelle	Hypsugo affinis Dobson, 1871	Forest near humans	LC^{IUCN} Unknown	
	Cadorna's pipistrelle	Hypsugo cadornae Thomas, 1916	Forest	LC^{IUCN} Unknown	
	Long-toothed pipistrelle	Hypsugo dolichodon Görföl et al., 2014	Caves & forests	DD^{IUCN} Unknown	
	Burma pipistrelle	Hypsugo lophurus Thomas, 1915	Only known from one grassland location in Tanintharyi; not reported since 1915	DD^{IUCN} Unknown	
	Chinese pipistrelle	Hypsugo pulveratus Peters, 1870	Limestone forest	LC^{IUCN} Unknown	
	Great evening bat	Ia io Thomas, 1902	Forest	NT^{IUCN} ▼	
	Flat-skulled woolly bat	Kerivoula depressa	Evergreen forest	LC^{IUCN} Unknown	
	Dark woolly bat	Kerivoula furva	Forest	LC^{IUCN} Unknown	
	Hairy-faced bat	Kerivoula hardwickii Dobson, 1871	Evergreen forest	LC^{IUCN} Unknown	
	Kachin woolly bat	Kerivoula kachinensis Bates, Struebig, Rossiter, Kingston, Sia Sein Lein Oo & Khin Mya Mya, 2004	Forest	LC^{IUCN}	
	Painted bat	Kerivoula picta Pallas, 1767	Wide variety of habitats	NT^{IUCN} ▼	
	Titania's woolly bat	Kerivoula titania Bates, Struebig, Hayes, Furey, Mya Mya, Thong, Tien, Son, Harrison, Francis & Csorba, 2007	Forest	LC^{IUCN} Unknown	
	Joffre's bat	Mirostrellus joffrei Thomas, 1915	Forest	DD^{IUCN} Unknown	
	Round-eared tube-nosed bat	Murina cyclotis Dobson, 1871	Caves & forests	LC^{IUCN} Unknown	
	Fea's tube-nosed bat	Murina feae	Forest	LC^{IUCN} Unknown	
	Harrison's tube-nosed bat	Murina harrisoni Csorba & Bates 2005	Forest	LC^{IUCN} Unknown	
	Hutton's tube-nosed bat	Murina huttoni Peters, 1872	Forest	LC^{IUCN} Unknown	
	Jaintia tube-nosed bat	Murina jaintiana	Found in the Chin Hills; much ambiguity about range & habitat	DD^{IUCN} Unknown	
	Large myotis	Myotis chinensis Tomes, 1857	Caves & forest	LC^{IUCN} Unknown	
	Lesser large-footed bat	Myotis hasseltii Temminck, 1840	Caves & forests	LC^{IUCN} Unknown	
	Horsfield's bat	Myotis horsfieldii Temminck, 1840	Caves & forest	LC^{IUCN}	
	Burmese whiskered myotis	Myotis montivagus Dobson, 1874	Caves & forest	DD^{IUCN}	
	Wall-roosting mouse-eared bat	Myotis muricola Gray, 1846	Caves & forests	LC^{IUCN}	
	Himalayan whiskered bat	Myotis siligorensis Horsfield, 1855	Caves & forests	LC^{IUCN} Unknown	
	Japanese house bat	Pipistrellus abramus Temminck, 1840	Wide range of habitats	LC^{IUCN}	
	Kelaart's pipistrelle	Pipistrellus ceylonicus Kelaart, 1852	Caves & forest	LC^{IUCN}	
	Indian pipistrelle	Pipistrellus coromandra Gray, 1838	Caves & forests	LC^{IUCN} Unknown	
	Java pipistrelle	Pipistrellus javanicus Gray, 1838	Caves & forest	LC^{IUCN}	
	Mount Popa pipistrelle	Pipistrellus paterculus Thomas, 1915	Caves & forest	LC^{IUCN} Unknown	
	Least pipistrelle	Pipistrellus tenuis Temminck C. J., 1840	Forest, shrubland, & grassland	LC^{IUCN}	
	Harlequin bat	Scotomanes ornatus Blyth, 1851	Caves & forests	LC^{IUCN} Unknown	
	Greater Asiatic yellow bat	Scotophilus heathii Horsfield, 1831	Forest & shrublands	LC^{IUCN}	
	Lesser Asiatic yellow bat	Scotophilus kuhlii Leach, 1821	Forest & shrublands	LC^{IUCN}	
	Lesser bamboo bat	Tylonycteris pachypus Temminck C. J., 1840	Forest	LC^{IUCN} Unknown	
	Greater bamboo bat	Tylonycteris robustula Thomas, 1915	Caves & forests	LC^{IUCN} Unknown	
Family Rhinopomatidae: mouse-tailed bats
	Greater mouse-tailed bat	Rhinopoma microphyllum Brünnich, 1792	Caves & shrubland	LC^{IUCN}	
Family Miniopteridae
	Western bent-winged bat	Miniopterus magnater Sanborn, 1931	Caves & forest	LC^{IUCN} Unknown	
	Small bent-winged bat	Miniopterus pusillus Dobson, 1876	Caves & forest	LC^{IUCN} Unknown	
Family Molossidae: free-tailed bats
	Wrinkle-lipped free-tailed bat	Chaerephon plicatus Buchanan, 1800	Caves, rocky areas, savanna & forests	LC^{IUCN} Unknown	
Family Emballonuridae
	Lesser sheath-tailed bat	Emballonura monticola Temminck, 1838	Caves & forest	LC^{IUCN}	
	Naked-rumped pouched bat	Saccolaimus saccolaimus Temminck, 1838	Caves, forest, & savanna	LC^{IUCN}	
	Long-winged tomb bat	Taphozous longimanus Hardwicke, 1825	Caves, rocky areas, savanna & forests	LC^{IUCN}	
	Black-bearded tomb bat	Taphozous melanopogon Temminck, 1841	Caves, rocky areas, shrubland & forests	LC^{IUCN}	
	Naked-rumped tomb bat	Taphozous nudiventris Cretzschmar, 1830	Forests & arid regions	LC^{IUCN}	
	Theobald's tomb bat	Taphozous theobaldi Dobson, 1872	Caves & forest	LC^{IUCN} Unknown	
Family Nycteridae: slit-faced bats
	Malayan slit-faced bat	Nycteris tragata K. Andersen, 1912	Caves & forest	NT^{IUCN} ▼	
Family Megadermatidae: false vampire bats
	Greater false vampire bat	Lyroderma lyra E. Geoffroy, 1810	Caves, rocky areas & forests	LC^{IUCN} Unknown	
	Lesser false vampire bat	Megaderma spasma Linnaeus, 1758	Caves, rocky areas & forests	LC^{IUCN} Unknown	
Family Rhinolophidae: horseshoe bats
	Acuminate horseshoe bat	Rhinolophus acuminatus Peters, 1871	Caves & forests	LC^{IUCN} Unknown	
	Intermediate horseshoe bat	Rhinolophus affinis Horsfield, 1823	Caves & forests	LC^{IUCN}	
	Croslet horseshoe bat	Rhinolophus coelophyllus Peters, 1867	Caves & forests	LC^{IUCN}	
	Blyth's horseshoe bat	Rhinolophus lepidus Blyth, 1844	Caves & forests	LC^{IUCN} Unknown	
	Great woolly horseshoe bat	Rhinolophus luctus Temminck, 1835	Caves, rocky areas, & forests	LC^{IUCN} Unknown	
	Big-eared horseshoe bat	Rhinolophus macrotis Blyth, 1844	Caves & forest	LC^{IUCN}	
	Malayan horseshoe bat	Rhinolophus malayanus Bonhote, 1903	Caves & forests	LC^{IUCN}	
	Marshall's horseshoe bat	Rhinolophus marshalli Thonglongya, 1973	Caves & forests	LC^{IUCN}	
	Indo-Chinese lesser brown horseshoe bat	Rhinolophus microglobosus Csorba and Jenkins, 1998	Caves & forests	LC^{IUCN}	
	Pearson's horseshoe bat	Rhinolophus pearsonii Horsfield, 1851	Caves & forests	LC^{IUCN} Unknown	
	Least horseshoe bat	Rhinolophus pusillus Temminck, 1834	Caves & forests	LC^{IUCN}	
	Shamel's horseshoe bat	Rhinolophus shameli Tate, 1943	Caves & forests	LC^{IUCN}	
	Shortridge's horseshoe bat	Rhinolophus shortridgei K. Andersen, 1918	Forest	DD^{IUCN} Unknown	
	Chinese rufous horseshoe bat	Rhinolophus sinicus K. Andersen, 1905	Forest	LC^{IUCN} Unknown	
	Little Nepalese horseshoe bat	Rhinolophus subbadius Blyth, 1844	Caves & forests	LC^{IUCN} ▼	
	Thomas's horseshoe bat	Rhinolophus thomasi K. Andersen, 1905	Caves & forests	LC^{IUCN} Unknown	
	Trefoil horseshoe bat	Rhinolophus trifoliatus Temminck, 1834	Forest	NT^{IUCN} ▼	
	Dobson's horseshoe bat	Rhinolophus yunanensis Dobson, 1872	Caves & forests	LC^{IUCN} Unknown	
Family Hipposideridae: Old World leaf-nosed bats
	Stoliczka's trident bat	Aselliscus stoliczkanus Dobson, 1871	Caves & forest	LC^{IUCN} Unknown	
	East Asian tailless leaf-nosed bat	Coelops frithii Blyth, 1848	Caves & forest	NT^{IUCN} ▼	
	House-dwelling leaf-nosed bat	Hipposideros einnaythu Douangboubpha, Bumrungsri, Satasook, Soisook, Bu, Aul, Harrison, Pearch, Thomas and Bates, 2011	Unknown	DD^{IUCN} Unknown	
	Great roundleaf bat	Hipposideros armiger Hodgson, 1835	Caves & forest	LC^{IUCN} Unknown	
	Dusky leaf-nosed bat	Hipposideros ater Templeton, 1848	Forest around limestone	LC^{IUCN} Unknown	
	Ashy roundleaf bat	Hipposideros cineraceus Blyth, 1853	Caves & forest	LC^{IUCN} Unknown	
	Diadem leaf-nosed bat	Hipposideros diadema É. Geoffroy, 1813	Caves, savanna, & forests	LC^{IUCN} ▼	
	Cantor's roundleaf bat	Hipposideros galeritus Cantor, 1846	Caves & forests	LC^{IUCN} Unknown	
	Grand roundleaf bat	Hipposideros grandis G.M. Allen, 1936	Unknown	LC^{IUCN} Unknown	
	Indian roundleaf bat	Hipposideros lankadiva Kelaart, 1850	Caves & forests	LC^{IUCN} Unknown	
	Intermediate roundleaf bat	Hipposideros larvatus Horsfield, 1823	Caves & forests	LC^{IUCN} Unknown	
	Shield-faced roundleaf bat	Hipposideros lylei Thomas, 1913	Caves & forest	LC^{IUCN} ▼	
Family Craseonycteridae
	Kitti's hog-nosed bat	Craseonycteris thonglongyai Hill, 1974	Karst near rivers; world's smallest bat	NT^{IUCN} ▼	

== Order: Dermoptera (colugos) ==
Image	Common name	Scientific name Authority	Preferred habitat	IUCN status	Range
Family Cynocephalidae: flying lemurs
	Sunda flying lemur	Galeopterus variegatus Audebert, 1799	Forest	LC^{IUCN} ▼	

== Order: Eulipotyphla (Hedgehogs, shrews, moles and relatives) ==
Image	Common name	Scientific name Authority	Preferred habitat	IUCN status	Range
Family Erinaceidae: hedgehogs
	Moonrat	Echinosorex gymnura Raffles, 1822	Forest	LC^{IUCN} Unknown	
	Northern short-tailed gymnure	Hylomys peguensis Blyth, 1859	Forest & shrubland		
	Shrew gymnure	Neotetracus sinensis Trouessart, 1909	Montane forest	LC^{IUCN} Unknown	
Family Soricidae: shrews
	Chinese mole shrew	Anourosorex squamipes Milne-Edwards, 1872	Montane forests	LC^{IUCN} Unknown	
	Burmese short-tailed shrew	Blarinella wardi Thomas, 1915	Montane forests	LC^{IUCN} Unknown	
	Himalayan water shrew	Chimarrogale himalayica Gray, 1842	Evergreen forests	LC^{IUCN} Unknown	
	Chinese water shrew	Chimarrogale styani de Winton, 1899	Montane environments	LC^{IUCN} Unknown	
	Lowe's shrew	Chodsigoa parca G. M. Allen, 1923	Montane forest	LC^{IUCN} Unknown	
	Asian gray shrew	Crocidura attenuata Milne-Edwards, 1872	Forest, shrubland, & grassland	LC^{IUCN} Unknown	
	Cranbrook's shrew	Crocidura cranbrooki	Forest	DD^{IUCN} Unknown	
	Southeast Asian shrew	Crocidura fuliginosa Blyth, 1856	Forest, shrublands, grasslands & rocky areas	LC^{IUCN}	
	Indochinese shrew	Crocidura indochinensis (Robinson and Kloss, 1922	Forest	LC^{IUCN} Unknown	
	Voracious shrew	Crocidura vorax Allen, 1923	Wide variety of habitats	LC^{IUCN} Unknown	
	Hodgson's brown-toothed shrew	Episoriculus caudatus Horsfield, 1851	Montane forest & grassland	LC^{IUCN} Unknown	
	Long-tailed brown-toothed shrew	Episoriculus leucops Horsfield, 1855	Forest	LC^{IUCN} Unknown	
	Long-tailed mountain shrew	Episoriculus macrurus Blanford, 1888	Forest	LC^{IUCN} Unknown	
	Elegant water shrew	Nectogale elegans Milne-Edwards, 1870	Aquatic environments	LC^{IUCN} Unknown	
	Lesser striped shrew	Sorex bedfordiae Thomas, 1911	Montane forest	LC^{IUCN} Unknown	
	Himalayan shrew	Soriculus nigrescens Gray, 1842	Montane forest & rocky areas	LC^{IUCN} Unknown	
	Etruscan shrew	Suncus etruscus Savi, 1822	Wide range of habitat	LC^{IUCN} Unknown	
	Asian house shrew	Suncus murinus Linnaeus, 1766	Widespread	LC^{IUCN}	
Family Talpidae: moles
	Kloss's mole	Euroscaptor klossi Thomas, 1929	Forest	LC^{IUCN} Unknown	
	White-tailed mole	Parascaptor leucura Blyth, 1850	Montane forest & scrub-grassland	LC^{IUCN} Unknown	
	Long-tailed mole	Scaptonyx fusicauda Milne-Edwards, 1872	Montane forest	LC^{IUCN} Unknown	
	Gracile shrew mole	Uropsilus gracilis Thomas, 1911	Montane forest	LC^{IUCN} Unknown	

== Order: Lagomorpha (lagomorphs) ==
Image	Common name	Scientific name Authority	Preferred habitat	IUCN status	Range
Family Leporidae: rabbits, hares
	Yunnan hare	Lepus peguensis Allen, 1927	Grassland	LC^{IUCN} ▼	
	Burmese hare	Lepus peguensis Thomas, 1923	Grasslands, shrublands, savanna, & forest	LC^{IUCN}	
	Forrest's pika	Ochotona forresti Blyth, 1855	Mountainous forest & shrubland	LC^{IUCN} Unknown	
	Moupin pika	Ochotona thibetana Milne-Edwards, 1871	Mountainous forest	LC^{IUCN} Unknown	

== Order: Rodentia (rodents) ==
Image	Common name	Scientific name Authority	Preferred habitat	IUCN status	Range
Family Hystricidae: Old World porcupines
	Asiatic brush-tailed porcupine	Atherurus macrourus Linnaeus, 1758	Montane forest	LC^{IUCN} ▼	
	Malayan porcupine	Hystrix brachyura Linnaeus, 1758	Forest, shrubland, & grassland	LC^{IUCN} ▼	
Family Sciuridae: squirrels
	Hairy-footed flying squirrel	Belomys pearsonii Gray, 1842	Dry deciduous forest	DD^{IUCN} Unknown	
	Grey-bellied squirrel	Callosciurus caniceps Gray, 1842	Forest & plantations	LC^{IUCN}	
	Pallas's squirrel	Callosciurus erythraeus Pallas, 1779	Montane forest & scrubland	LC^{IUCN}	
	Finlayson's squirrel	Callosciurus finlaysonii Horsfield, 1823	Forest, shrubland, & inland wetlands	LC^{IUCN}	
	Phayre's squirrel	Callosciurus phayrei Blyth, 1855	Rainforest	LC^{IUCN} Unknown	
	Irrawaddy squirrel	Callosciurus pygerythrus I. Geoffroy Saint Hilaire, 1832	Evergreen & semievergreen forest	LC^{IUCN}	
	Anderson's squirrel	Callosciurus quinquestriatus Anderson, 1871	Forest	LC^{IUCN} Unknown	
	Orange-bellied Himalayan squirrel	Dremomys lokriah Hodgson, 1836	Forest	LC^{IUCN} ▼	
	Perny's long-nosed squirrel	Dremomys pernyi Milne-Edwards, 1867	Forest	LC^{IUCN}	
	Asian red-cheeked squirrel	Dremomys rufigenis Blanford, 1878	Forest & shrubland	LC^{IUCN}	
	Particolored flying squirrel	Hylopetes alboniger Hodgson, 1836	Forest & shrubland	LC^{IUCN} ▼	
	Indochinese flying squirrel	Hylopetes phayrei Blyth, 1859	Lower montane & mixed deciduous forests	LC^{IUCN}	
	Red-cheeked flying squirrel	Hylopetes spadiceus Blyth, 1859	Forest & scrubland	LC^{IUCN} Unknown	
	Berdmore's ground squirrel	Menetes berdmorei Blyth, 1849	Forest, shrubland, & grassland	LC^{IUCN}	
	Spotted giant flying squirrel	Petaurista elegans Müller, 1840	Montane forest	LC^{IUCN}	
	Red giant flying squirrel	Petaurista petaurista Pallas, 1766	Forest	LC^{IUCN} ▼	
	Indian giant flying squirrel	Petaurista philippensis Elliot, 1839	Forest	LC^{IUCN} ▼	
	Temminck's flying squirrel	Petinomys setosus Temminck, 1844	Forest	VU^{IUCN} ▼	
	Black giant squirrel	Ratufa bicolor Sparrman, 1778	Forest	NT^{IUCN} ▼	
	Himalayan striped squirrel	Tamiops mcclellandii Horsfield, 1840	Forest, shrubland, grassland, & inland wetlands	LC^{IUCN}	
	Swinhoe's striped squirrel	Tamiops swinhoei Milne-Edwards, 1874	Wide variety of habitats	LC^{IUCN}	
Family Spalacidae
	Lesser bamboo rat	Cannomys badius Hodgson, 1841	Forest	LC^{IUCN} Unknown	
	Hoary bamboo rat	Rhizomys pruinosus Blyth, 1851	Gorest & grassland	LC^{IUCN}	
	Chinese bamboo rat	Rhizomys sinensis J. E. Gray, 1831	Montane forest	LC^{IUCN} Unknown	
	Large bamboo rat	Rhizomys sumatrensis Raffles, 1821	Forest	LC^{IUCN} Unknown	
Family Cricetidae
	Kachin red-backed vole	Eothenomys cachinus Thomas, 1921	Montane forest	LC^{IUCN} Unknown	
	Père David's vole	Eothenomys melanogaster Milne-Edwards, 1871	Forest, shrubland, & grassland	LC^{IUCN}	
	Clarke's vole	Microtus clarkei Hinton, 1923	Forest & alpine meadow	LC^{IUCN}	
	Forrest's mountain vole	Neodon forresti Hinton, 1923	Alpine meadow	DD^{IUCN} Unknown	
Family Muridae: mice, rats, gerbils
	Striped field mouse	Apodemus agrarius Pallas, 1771	Wide range of habitats	LC^{IUCN}	
	South China field mouse	Apodemus draco Barrett-Hamilton, 1900	Forest heath	LC^{IUCN}	
	Sichuan field mouse	Apodemus latronum Thomas, 1911	Alpine forest & meadow	LC^{IUCN} Unknown	
	Lesser bandicoot rat	Bandicota bengalensis Gray, 1835	Primarily cropland	LC^{IUCN} ▲	
	Greater bandicoot rat	Bandicota indica Bechstein, 1800	Primarily cropland & cities	LC^{IUCN} ▲	
	Savile's bandicoot rat	Bandicota savilei Thomas, 1916	Primarily cropland	LC^{IUCN}	
	Small white-toothed rat	Berylmys berdmorei Blyth, 1851	Forest	LC^{IUCN}	
	Bower's white-toothed rat	Berylmys bowersi Anderson, 1879	Wide variety of habitats	LC^{IUCN} ▼	
	Kenneth's white-toothed rat	Berylmys mackenziei Thomas, 1916	Montane forest	DD^{IUCN} Unknown	
	Manipur white-toothed rat	Berylmys manipulus Thomas, 1916	Forest, shrubland, & grassland	DD^{IUCN} Unknown	
	Fea's tree rat	Chiromyscus chiropus Thomas, 1891	Deciduous & evergreen forest	LC^{IUCN}	
	Indomalayan pencil-tailed tree mouse	Chiropodomys gliroides Blyth, 1856	Forest	LC^{IUCN}	
	Crump's mouse	Diomys crumpi Thomas, 1917	Forest	DD^{IUCN} Unknown	
	Marmoset rat	Hapalomys longicaudatus Blyth, 1859	Evergreen lowland forest	EN^{IUCN} ▼	
	Edwards's long-tailed giant rat	Leopoldamys edwardsi Thomas, 1882	Forest	LC^{IUCN} Unknown	
	Red spiny rat	Maxomys surifer Miller, 1900	Forest	LC^{IUCN} ▼	
	Miss Ryley's soft-furred rat	Millardia kathleenae Thomas, 1914	Scrubland	LC^{IUCN}	
	Little Indian field mouse	Mus booduga Gray, 1837	Scrubland & cropland	LC^{IUCN}	
	Ryukyu mouse	Mus caroli Bonhote, 1902	Shrubland & grassland	LC^{IUCN}	
	Fawn-colored mouse	Mus cervicolor Hodgson, 1845	Forest, shrubland, & grassland	LC^{IUCN}	
	Cook's mouse	Mus cookii Ryley, 1914	Forest	LC^{IUCN}	
	House mouse	Mus musculus Linnaeus, 1758	Introduced; commensal with humans	LC^{IUCN}	
	Gairdner's shrewmouse	Mus pahari Thomas, 1916	Forest	LC^{IUCN}	
	Shortridge's mouse	Mus shortridgei Thomas, 1914	Grassland & shrubland	LC^{IUCN}	
	Brahma white-bellied rat	Niviventer brahma Thomas, 1914	Montane forest	LC^{IUCN}	
	Chinese white-bellied rat	Niviventer confucianus Milne-Edwards, 1871	Forest and croplands	LC^{IUCN}	
	Dark-tailed tree rat	Niviventer cremoriventer Miller, 1900	Forest	LC^{IUCN} Unknown	
	Smoke-bellied rat	Niviventer eha Wroughton, 1916	Montane forest & shrubland	LC^{IUCN}	
	Lang Bian white-bellied rat	Niviventer langbianis Robinson & Kloss, 1922	Evergreen forest	LC^{IUCN} ▼	
	Tenasserim white-bellied rat	Niviventer tenaster Thomas, 1916	Montane forest	LC^{IUCN} Unknown	
	Sikkim rat	Rattus andamanensis Blyth, 1860	Forest	LC^{IUCN}	
	Polynesian rat	Rattus exulans Peale, 1848	Widespread	LC^{IUCN}	
	Himalayan field rat	Rattus nitidus (Hodgson, 1845)	Introduced; forest and cropland	LC^{IUCN}	
	Brown rat	Rattus norvegicus Berkenhout, 1769	Introduced; Widespread in the presence of humans	LC^{IUCN}	
	Black rat	Rattus rattus Linnaeus, 1758	Introduced; commensal with humans	LC^{IUCN}	
	Tanezumi rat	Rattus tanezumi Temminck, 1844	Forest, shrublands, & grasslands	LC^{IUCN} ▲	
	Müller's giant Sunda rat	Sundamys muelleri (Jentink, 1879)	Forest	LC^{IUCN} ▼	
	Asiatic long-tailed climbing mouse	Vandeleuria oleracea Bennett, 1832	Forest, shrublands, & grasslands	LC^{IUCN}	
	Red climbing mouse	Vernaya fulva G.M. Allen, 1927	Montane forest	LC^{IUCN} Unknown	

== Order: Perissodactyla (odd-toed ungulates) ==
Image	Common name	Scientific name Authority	Preferred habitat	IUCN status	Range
Family Dugongidae
	Malayan tapir	Tapirus indicus Desmarest, 1819	Tropical moist forests	EN^{IUCN} ▼	

== Order: Pholidota (pangolins) ==
Image	Common name	Scientific name Authority	Preferred habitat	IUCN status	Range
Family Manidae
	Sunda pangolin	Manis javanica Desmarest, 1822	Forest & shrubland	CR^{IUCN} ▼	
	Chinese pangolin	Manis pentadactyla Linnaeus, 1758	Forest, grassland, & shrubland	CR^{IUCN} ▼	

== Order: Primates ==
Image	Common name	Scientific name Authority	Preferred habitat	IUCN status	Range
Family Lorisidae: lorises, bushbabies
	Bengal slow loris	Nycticebus bengalensis Lacépède, 1800	Forest	EN^{IUCN} ▼	
Family Cercopithecidae: Old World monkeys
	Stump-tailed macaque	Macaca arctoides I. Geoffroy, 1831	Forest	VU^{IUCN} ▼	
	Assam macaque	Macaca assamensis McClelland, 1840	Forest	NT^{IUCN} ▼	
	Crab-eating macaque	Macaca fascicularis Raffles, 1821	Forest, wetlands, & intertidal marine zone	EN^{IUCN} ▼	
	Northern pig-tailed macaque	Macaca leonina Blyth, 1863	Forest	VU^{IUCN} ▼	
	Rhesus macaque	Macaca mulatta Zimmermann, 1780	Widespread, including around humans	LC^{IUCN} Unknown	
	Robinson's banded langur	Presbytis robinsoni Thomas, 1910	Lowland rainforest	NT^{IUCN} ▼	
	Myanmar snub-nosed monkey	Rhinopithecus strykeri Geissmann et al., 2010	Montane forest	CR^{IUCN} ▼	
	Tenasserim lutung	Trachypithecus barbei Blyth, 1847	Evergreen forest	VU^{IUCN} ▼	
	Indochinese grey langur	Trachypithecus crepusculus Elliot, 1909	Forest & limestone karst	EN^{IUCN} ▼	
	Shan State langur	Trachypithecus melamera Elliot, 1909	Described in 2020; not yet assessed by IUCN		
	Dusky leaf monkey	Trachypithecus obscurus Reid, 1837	Forest & around humans	EN^{IUCN} ▼	
	Phayre's leaf monkey	Trachypithecus phayrei Blyth, 1847	Forest	EN^{IUCN} ▼	
	Capped langur	Trachypithecus pileatus Blyth, 1847	Forest	VU^{IUCN} ▼	
	Popa langur	Trachypithecus popa Roos et al., 2020	Forest	CR^{IUCN} ▼	
	Shortridge's langur	Trachypithecus shortridgei Shortridge's Langur area.png	Evergreen & semi-evergreen forest	EN^{IUCN} ▼	
Family Hylobatidae: gibbons
	Western hoolock gibbon	Hoolock hoolock Harlan, 1834	Forest	EN^{IUCN} ▼	
	Eastern hoolock gibbon	Hoolock leuconedys Groves, 1967	Forest	VU^{IUCN} ▼	
	Skywalker hoolock gibbon	Hoolock tianxing Fan et al., 2017	Forest	EN^{IUCN} ▼	
	Lar gibbon	Hylobates lar Linnaeus, 1771	Evergreen & semi-evergreen forest	EN^{IUCN} ▼	

== Order: Proboscidea (elephants) ==
Image	Common name	Scientific name Authority	Preferred habitat	IUCN status	Range
Family Elephantidae: elephants
	Asian elephant	Elephas maximus Linnaeus, 1758	Forest, shrubland, grassland	EN^{IUCN} ▼	

== Order: Scandentia (treeshrews) ==
Image	Common name	Scientific name Authority	Preferred habitat	IUCN status	Range
Family Tupaiidae: treeshrews
	Northern treeshrew	Tupaia belangeri Wagner, 1841	Forest & shrubland	LC^{IUCN}	

== Order: Sirenia (manatees and dugongs) ==
Image	Common name	Scientific name Authority	Preferred habitat	IUCN status	Range
Family Dugongidae
	Dugong	Dugong dugon Müller, 1776	Neritic & intertidal marine zones	VU^{IUCN} ▼	

== See also ==
- Wildlife of Myanmar
- List of birds of Myanmar
