= Marmoset (disambiguation) =

Marmosets are New World monkeys in the genus Callithrix.

Marmoset may also refer to:

- Delacour's marmoset rat, a rodent
- Marmoset (band), an American indie rock band
- Marmoset (music agency), an American independent music agency
- Marmoset rat, a rodent
- Marmousets, counselors to Charles VI of France

== See also ==
- Marmozets, an English math rock band
