= Oldfield white-bellied rat =

- Specimen on display in National Taiwan Museum

Conservation status
- Least Concern (IUCN 3.1)

Scientific classification
- Kingdom: Animalia
- Phylum: Chordata
- Class: Mammalia
- Order: Rodentia
- Family: Muridae
- Genus: Niviventer
- Species: N. culturatus

Binomial name
- Niviventer culturatus (Thomas, 1917)

Species of rodent

The Oldfield white-bellied rat or soft-furred Taiwan niviventer (Niviventer culturatus) is a species of rodent in the family Muridae. It is found only in Taiwan. It has also been considered a subspecies of Niviventer niviventer and included in Niviventer confucianus.

== Description ==
Niviventer culturatus are 13 to 15 cm (5.1 to 5.9 in) long, not including a 17 to 20 cm (6.7 to 7.9 in) tail. They are dorsally dark grayish brown and ventrally creamy white; there is a sharp border between the dorsal and ventral coloration. The tail is similarly bicolored except for the terminal portion that is entirely white. The face is rather grayish but has dark patches just in front of and behind the eyes. The digits are white.

== Habitat ==
This species occurs in primary hemlock forests, and sometimes in secondary habitats, typically at elevations of 300–2,000 m (980–6,560 ft) above sea level. It can be locally common and is found in the Yushan National Park.
