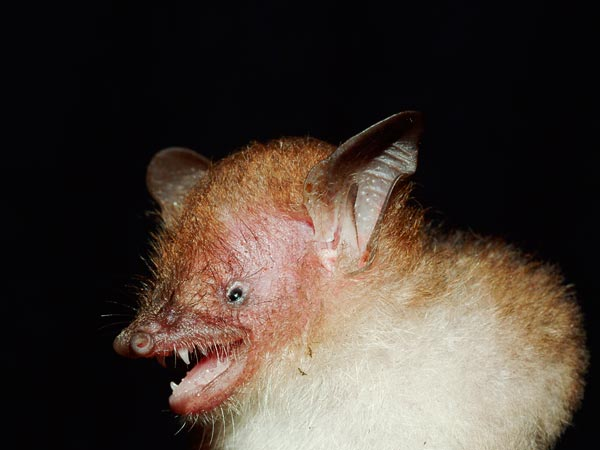

Conservation status
- Data Deficient (IUCN 3.1)

Scientific classification
- Kingdom: Animalia
- Phylum: Chordata
- Class: Mammalia
- Order: Chiroptera
- Family: Vespertilionidae
- Genus: Murina
- Species: M. walstoni

Binomial name
- Murina walstoni Furey, Csorba & Son, 2011
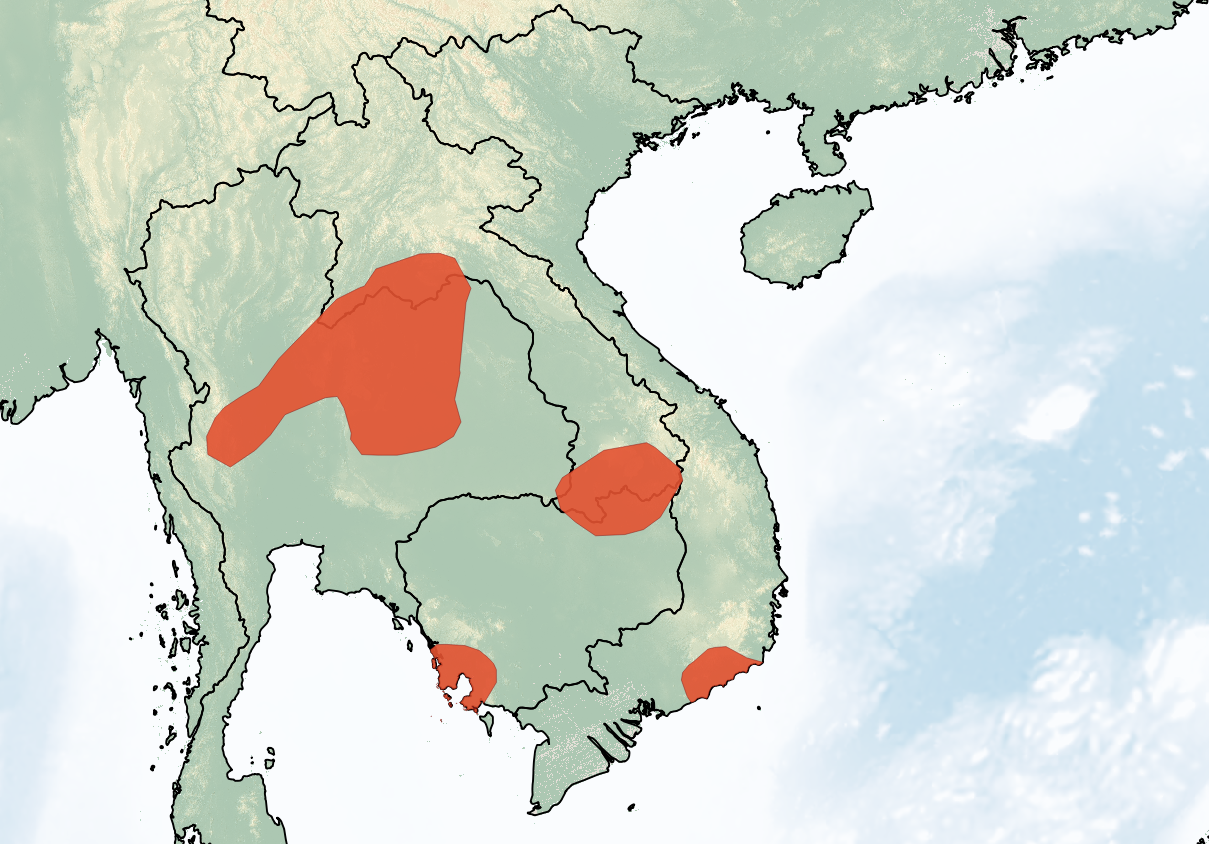

= Walston's tube-nosed bat =

Species of bat

Walston's tube-nosed bat (Murina walstoni) is a species in the vesper bat family Vespertilionidae, found in the Greater Mekong region of Southeast Asia, specifically the Đắk Lắk Province of Vietnam and the Koh Kong and Ratanakiri provinces of Cambodia. This species was discovered in northeastern Cambodia in the Van Sai Protected Forest. They have tube-shaped nostrils (hence the name), which assist them with feeding.

Walston's bat is one of 126 new species found in the Greater Mekong region in 2011. Two other tube-nosed bats were found in Southeast Asia in 2011: the Ashy-gray tube-nosed bat (Murina cineracea) and Beelzebub's tube-nosed bat (Murina beelzebub). All three species are small for bats, and M. walstoni is small for a Murina bat. Hungarian Natural History Museum (HNHM) and Fauna and Flora International (FFI) teams discovered these three new tube-nosed bats. All three of these bats live in tropical forests, making them endangered to deforestation.

It is named after Joe Walston, an expert on bats of Vietnam and Cambodia. Walston works at the Bronx Zoo in the Wildlife Conservation Society as the Executive Vice President for Global Conservation. The bat's dorsal fur is a medium brown, and its ventral fur is white. This bat is small enough to fit in a person's hand, weighing 4.5 and 5.5 grams (0.16 and 0.19 oz). As of 2013, there are still few details about them and their ecology, and it is suspected that many more species of bats are yet to be discovered in the region.

Vespertilionid bats have many cryptic species. Eight new species were found in Southeast Asia between 2005 and 2009. The use of DNA technology has proved very useful in differentiating between the various species of Murina.

== See also ==
- Peters's tube-nosed bat
- Scully's tube-nosed bat
