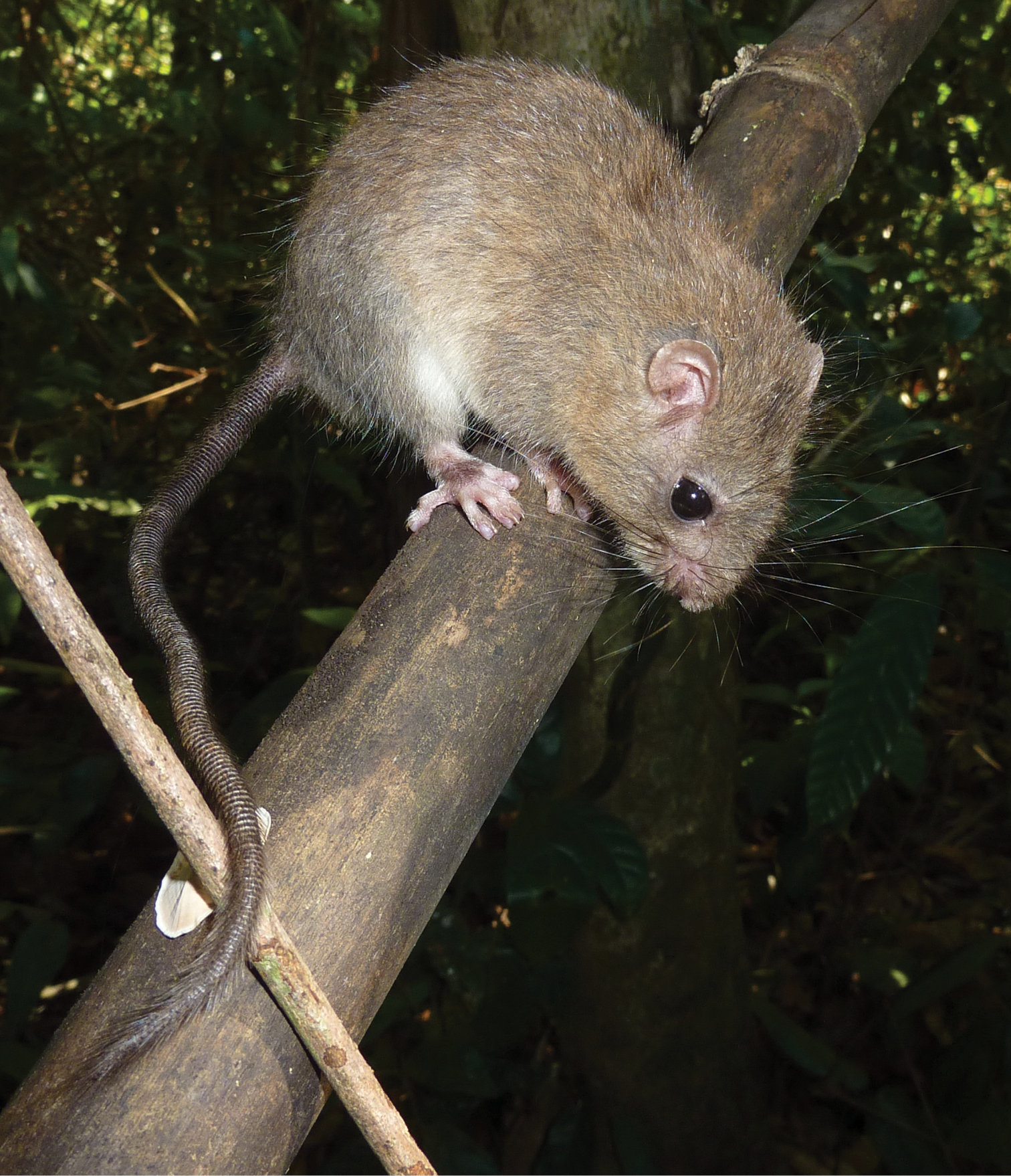
- adult male Hapalomys suntsovi

Scientific classification
- Domain: Eukaryota
- Kingdom: Animalia
- Phylum: Chordata
- Class: Mammalia
- Order: Rodentia
- Family: Muridae
- Subfamily: Murinae
- Tribe: Hapalomyini; Pagès et al., 2015
- Genus: Hapalomys; Blyth, 1859

Type species
- Hapalomys longicaudatus

Species
- Hapalomys delacouri Hapalomys longicaudatus Hapalomys suntsovi †Hapalomys gracilis

= Hapalomys =

Hapalomys Temporal range: Late Pliocene to Recent

Genus of rodents

Hapalomys is a genus of rodent in the family Muridae endemic to Southeast Asia. It is the only member of the tribe Hapalomyini. It contains the following species:

- Delacour's marmoset rat (Hapalomys delacouri)
- Marmoset rat (Hapalomys longicaudatus)
- Suntsov's marmoset rat (Hapalomys suntsovi), a Vietnamese endemic recently described from Binh Phuoc Province, southern Vietnam

†Hapalomys gracilis (fossil species)
