= Montane Sumatran white-bellied rat =

Conservation status
- Least Concern (IUCN 3.1)

Scientific classification
- Kingdom: Animalia
- Phylum: Chordata
- Class: Mammalia
- Order: Rodentia
- Family: Muridae
- Genus: Niviventer
- Species: N. fraternus

Binomial name
- Niviventer fraternus (Robinson & Kloss, 1916)

Species of rodent

The montane Sumatran white-bellied rat (Niviventer fraternus), also known as the Montane Sumatran niviventer, is a species of rodent in the family Muridae. It is found in the montane forests along the mountains of western Sumatra, Indonesia.
