= Wildlife of Myanmar =

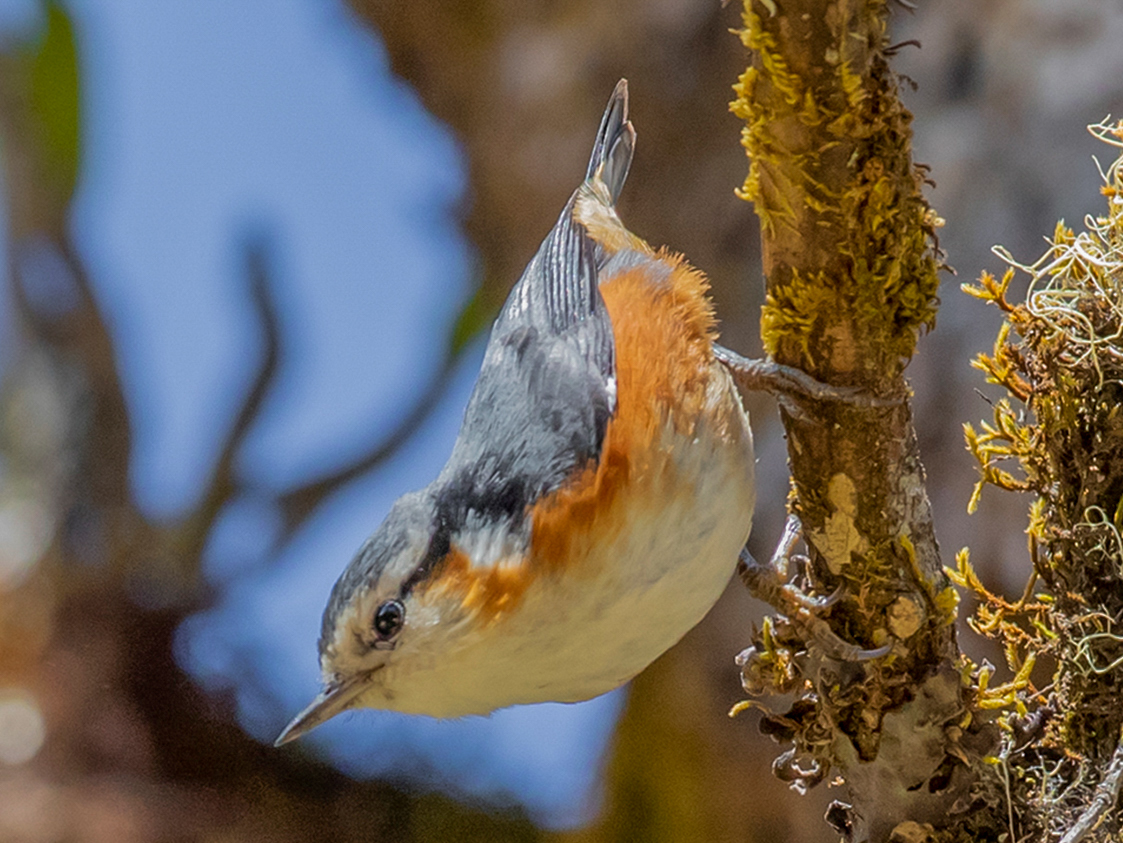
The white-browed nuthatch is endemic to Mount Victoria in Chin State.

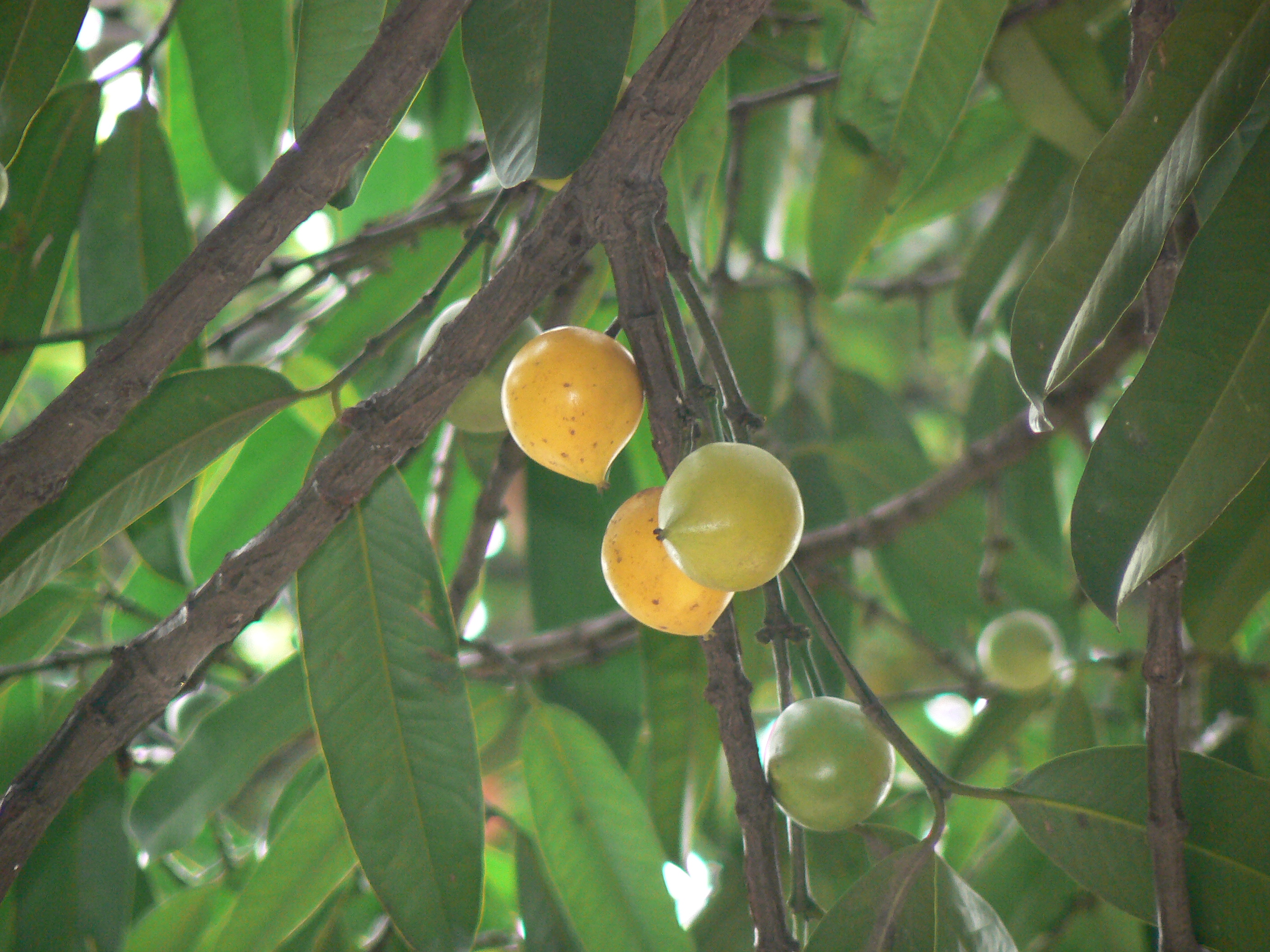
Yellow mangosteen, found in tropical regions of Myanmar

The wildlife of Myanmar includes a diverse range of flora and fauna and natural habitats. As the largest country in Mainland Southeast Asia, Myanmar has numerous types of ecosystems, ranging from tropical rainforests to alpine tundra and mountains. According to the Convention on Biological Diversity, Myanmar has 11,824 plant, 1,056 bird, 775 fish, 293 reptile, 252 mammal, and 139 amphibian species.

== Flora ==
Like all Southeastern Asian forests, the forests of Myanmar can be divided into two categories: monsoon forest and rainforest. Monsoon forest is dry at least three months a year, and is dominated by deciduous trees. Rainforests have a rainy season of at least nine months, and are dominated by broadleaf evergreen.

In the Himalayan region north of the Tropic of Cancer, flora changes with altitude. Up to around 2,000 metres (6,600 ft), the dominant vegetation is subtropical broadleaf evergreen. Between 2,000 and 3,000 metres (6,600 and 9,800 ft), semi-deciduous broadleaf dominates, and above 3,000 metres (9,800 ft), evergreen conifers and subalpine forest are the primary flora. At even higher elevations, alpine scrublands are common.

The area from Yangon to Myitkyina is mostly monsoon forest, while peninsular Malaysia south of Mawlamyine is primarily rainforest, with some overlap between the two. Along the coasts of Rakhine State and Tanintharyi Division, tidal forests occur in estuaries, lagoons, tidal creeks, and low islands. These forests are host to the much-depleted Myanmar Coast mangroves habitat of mangrove and other trees that grow in mud and are resistant to sea water. Forests along the beaches consist of palm trees, hibiscus, casuarinas, and other trees resistant to storms.

As of 2025, there are about 14,020 species of plants, including 13,314 native species and 706 introduced species. The top 10 largest families of Myanmar flora are Orchidaceae, Fabaceae, Poaceae, Asteraceae, Rubiaceae, Acanthaceae, Lamiaceae, Ericaceae, Cyperaceae, and Rosaceae.

== Fauna ==
Myanmar is home to nearly 300 known mammal species, 300 reptile species, and about 1000 bird species. There are also many non-marine molluscs in Myanmar. Freshwater biodiversity studies in Myanmar have revealed high endemism in molluscs. Three endemic species of the clam genus Corbicula (C. avana, C. bilini, C. lemroae) were confirmed or described from rivers in Myanmar based on integrative taxonomy.

== See also ==
- Deforestation in Myanmar

== Bibliography ==
- Aung, Ye Lwin; Aung, Mung Htoi; Tan, Yunhong; Jin, Xiaohua (2025). "An updated checklist of vascular plants of Myanmar". PhytoKeys: 135–164. doi:10.3897/phytokeys.261.154986. PMC 12361923.
