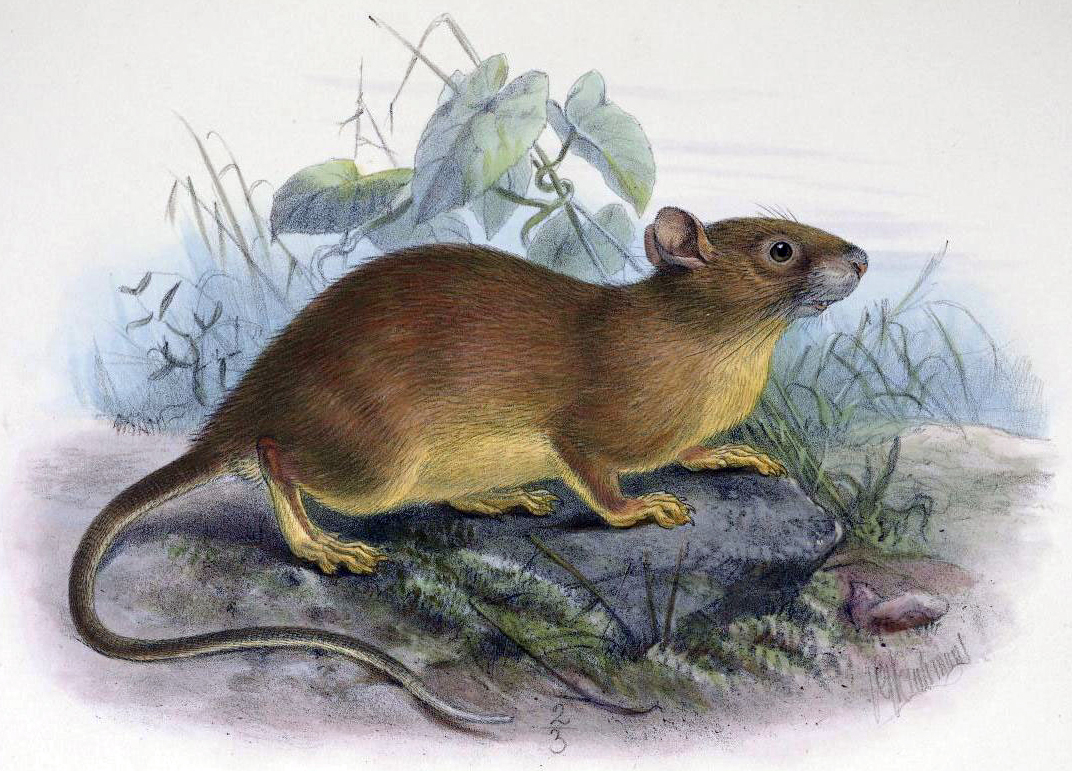
- Bower's white-toothed rat (Berylmys bowersi)

Scientific classification
- Domain: Eukaryota
- Kingdom: Animalia
- Phylum: Chordata
- Class: Mammalia
- Order: Rodentia
- Family: Muridae
- Tribe: Rattini
- Genus: Berylmys; Ellerman, 1947

Type species
- Epimys manipulus

Species
- Berylmys berdmorei Berylmys bowersi Berylmys mackenziei Berylmys manipulus

= White-toothed rat =

White-toothed rats Temporal range: Early Pleistocene to Recent

Genus of rodents

The white-toothed rats, genus Berylmys, are a group of Old World rats from Asia.

== Species ==
Genus Berylmys

- small white-toothed rat, Berylmys berdmorei Blyth, 1851
- Bower's white-toothed rat, Berylmys bowersi Anderson, 1879
- Kenneth's white-toothed rat, Berylmys mackenziei Thomas, 1916
- Manipur white-toothed rat, Berylmys manipulus Thomas, 1916
