= Large white-bellied rat =

Conservation status
- Least Concern (IUCN 3.1)

Scientific classification
- Kingdom: Animalia
- Phylum: Chordata
- Class: Mammalia
- Order: Rodentia
- Family: Muridae
- Genus: Niviventer
- Species: N. excelsior

Binomial name
- Niviventer excelsior (Thomas, 1911)

Species of rodent

The large white-bellied rat (Niviventer excelsior), also known as the Sichuan niviventer, is a species of rodent in the family Muridae. It is found only in southwestern China. It occurs in Jiuzhaigou National Nature Reserve of Sichuan, southwestern Sichuan, northwestern Yunnan, and the Ailao Mountains of Yunnan.
