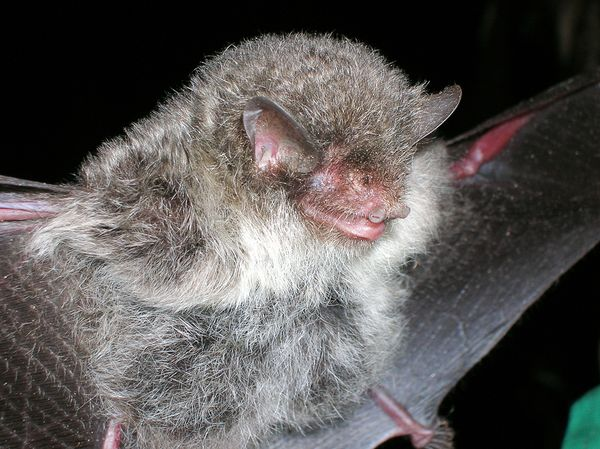

Conservation status
- Least Concern (IUCN 3.1)

Scientific classification
- Kingdom: Animalia
- Phylum: Chordata
- Class: Mammalia
- Order: Chiroptera
- Family: Vespertilionidae
- Genus: Murina
- Species: M. feae

Binomial name
- Murina feae Thomas, 1891

Synonyms
- Murina cineracea Csorba & Furey, 2011

= Fea's tube-nosed bat =

Species of bat

Fea's tube-nosed bat (Murina feae), also known as the ashy tube-nosed bat, is a species in the vesper bat in the family Vespertilionidae, found in southeastern Asia (including Myanmar, Thailand, Cambodia, Laos, and Vietnam) and southern China. They have tube-shaped nostrils (hence the name) which assist them with their feeding. It is named after Italian naturalist Leonardo Fea.

Originally described by Oldfield Thomas in 1891, it was later synonymized with the little tube-nosed bat (M. aurata). In 2011, populations of Scully's tube-nosed bat (M. tubinaris) from Southeast Asia were described as a new species, the ashy tube-nosed bat (M. cineracea). The ashy-gray bat was one of 126 new species found in the Greater Mekong region during 2011, discovered by a team from the Hungarian Natural History Museum (HNHM) and Fauna and Flora International (FFI). There were two other tube-nosed bats found in Southeast Asia in 2011: Beelzebub's tube-nosed bat (M. beelzebub) and Walston's tube-nosed bat (M. walstoni). However, further analysis found that populations of M. cineracea belong to Thomas's M. feae, which was also found to be distinct from M. aurata; M. feae was thus revived as a distinct species.

The former name "ashy" comes from the color of their dorsal fur, while the ventral fur is dark gray, and there is some white fur on the breast area. In some areas the tips of the hair are dark. It lacks the golden guard hairs so common in other members of the genus Murina. This bat is small enough to fit in a person's hand, weighing between 4.0 and 5.5 grams (0.14 and 0.19 oz).

== See also ==
- Peter's tube-nosed bat
