= Cameron Highlands white-bellied rat =

Conservation status
- Vulnerable (IUCN 3.1)

Scientific classification
- Kingdom: Animalia
- Phylum: Chordata
- Class: Mammalia
- Order: Rodentia
- Family: Muridae
- Genus: Niviventer
- Species: N. cameroni

Binomial name
- Niviventer cameroni Chasen, 1940

Species of rodent

The Cameron Highlands white-bellied rat (Niviventer cameroni), also known as the Cameron Highlands niviventer, is a species of rodent in the family Muridae. It has only been found in the mountain forests of the Cameron Highlands on the Malay Peninsula at an altitude of 1,500–2,000 metres (5,000–6,600 ft).
