= Narrow-tailed white-bellied rat =

Conservation status
- Least Concern (IUCN 3.1)

Scientific classification
- Kingdom: Animalia
- Phylum: Chordata
- Class: Mammalia
- Order: Rodentia
- Family: Muridae
- Genus: Niviventer
- Species: N. lepturus

Binomial name
- Niviventer lepturus (Jentink, 1879)

Species of rodent

The narrow-tailed white-bellied rat (Niviventer lepturus) is a species of rodent in the family Muridae. It is found only in Indonesia.
