= Hapalomys gracilis =

Scientific classification
- Kingdom: Animalia
- Phylum: Chordata
- Class: Mammalia
- Order: Rodentia
- Family: Muridae
- Genus: Hapalomys
- Species: H. gracilis

Binomial name
- Hapalomys gracilis Zheng, 1993

Fossil rodent from the genus Hapalomys found in Longgupo in South China

Hapalomys gracilis is a fossil rodent from the genus Hapalomys found in Longgupo in South China. The species designation gracilis is Latin for 'thin'. Only a first subchase of this species is known. This molar is smaller than that of all other types of Hapalomys. The molar also has smaller labial nodules than all species except H. angustidens and differs from all species except H. angustidens in the absence of the posterolabial cingulum.
