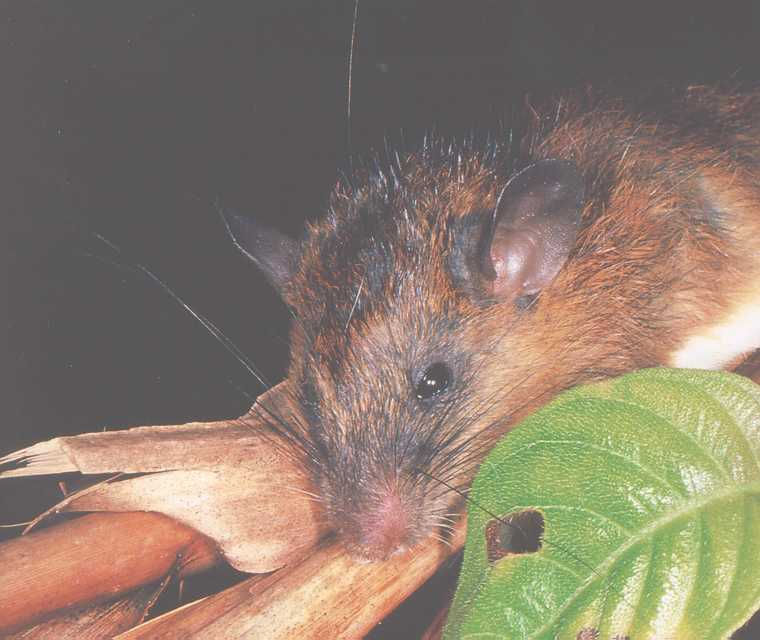
- Dark-tailed tree rat (Niviventer cremoriventer)

Scientific classification
- Domain: Eukaryota
- Kingdom: Animalia
- Phylum: Chordata
- Class: Mammalia
- Order: Rodentia
- Family: Muridae
- Tribe: Rattini
- Genus: Niviventer; J. T. Marshall, 1976

Type species
- Mus niviventer

Species
- 18, see text

= Niviventer =

Niviventer Temporal range: Late Pliocene - Recent

Genus of rodents

Niviventer is a genus of rodent in the family Muridae endemic to Southeast Asia. It contains the following species:

- Anderson's white-bellied rat, Niviventer andersoni
- Brahma white-bellied rat, Niviventer brahma
- Niviventer bukit
- Cameron Highlands white-bellied rat, Niviventer cameroni
- Chinese white-bellied rat, Niviventer confucianus
- Coxing's white-bellied rat, Niviventer coninga
- Dark-tailed tree rat, Niviventer cremoriventer
- Oldfield white-bellied rat, Niviventer culturatus
- Smoke-bellied rat, Niviventer eha
- Large white-bellied rat, Niviventer excelsior
- Tibetan white-bellied rat, Niviventer fengi
- Montane Sumatran white-bellied rat, Niviventer fraternus
- Chestnut white-bellied rat, Niviventer fulvescens
- Limestone rat, Niviventer hinpoon
- Niviventer huang
- Lang Bian white-bellied rat, Niviventer langbianis
- Narrow-tailed white-bellied rat, Niviventer lepturus
- Hainan white-bellied rat, Niviventer lotipes (Allen, 1926) (formerly in N. tenaster)
- Mekong white-bellied rat, Niviventer mekongis
- White-bellied rat, Niviventer niviventer
- Long-tailed mountain rat, Niviventer rapit
- Tenasserim white-bellied rat, Niviventer tenaster
