= Hapalomys suntsovi =

Conservation status
- Least Concern (IUCN 3.1)

Scientific classification
- Kingdom: Animalia
- Phylum: Chordata
- Class: Mammalia
- Order: Rodentia
- Family: Muridae
- Genus: Hapalomys
- Species: H. suntsovi

Binomial name
- Hapalomys suntsovi Abramov, A.E. Balakirev & Rozhnov, 2017

Species of rodent

Hapalomys suntsovi, Suntsov's marmoset rat, is a species of rodent native to Vietnam and possibly Cambodia.
