= Long-tailed mountain rat =

Conservation status
- Least Concern (IUCN 3.1)

Scientific classification
- Kingdom: Animalia
- Phylum: Chordata
- Class: Mammalia
- Order: Rodentia
- Family: Muridae
- Genus: Niviventer
- Species: N. rapit

Binomial name
- Niviventer rapit (Bonhote, 1903)

Species of rodent

The long-tailed mountain rat (Niviventer rapit) is a species of rodent in the family Muridae. It is endemic to Borneo and found in Indonesia and Malaysia. Recorded at elevations of 940–3,360 m (3,080–11,020 ft) above sea level, it is a poorly known species but presumably common, assumed to inhabit forests and scrubland.
