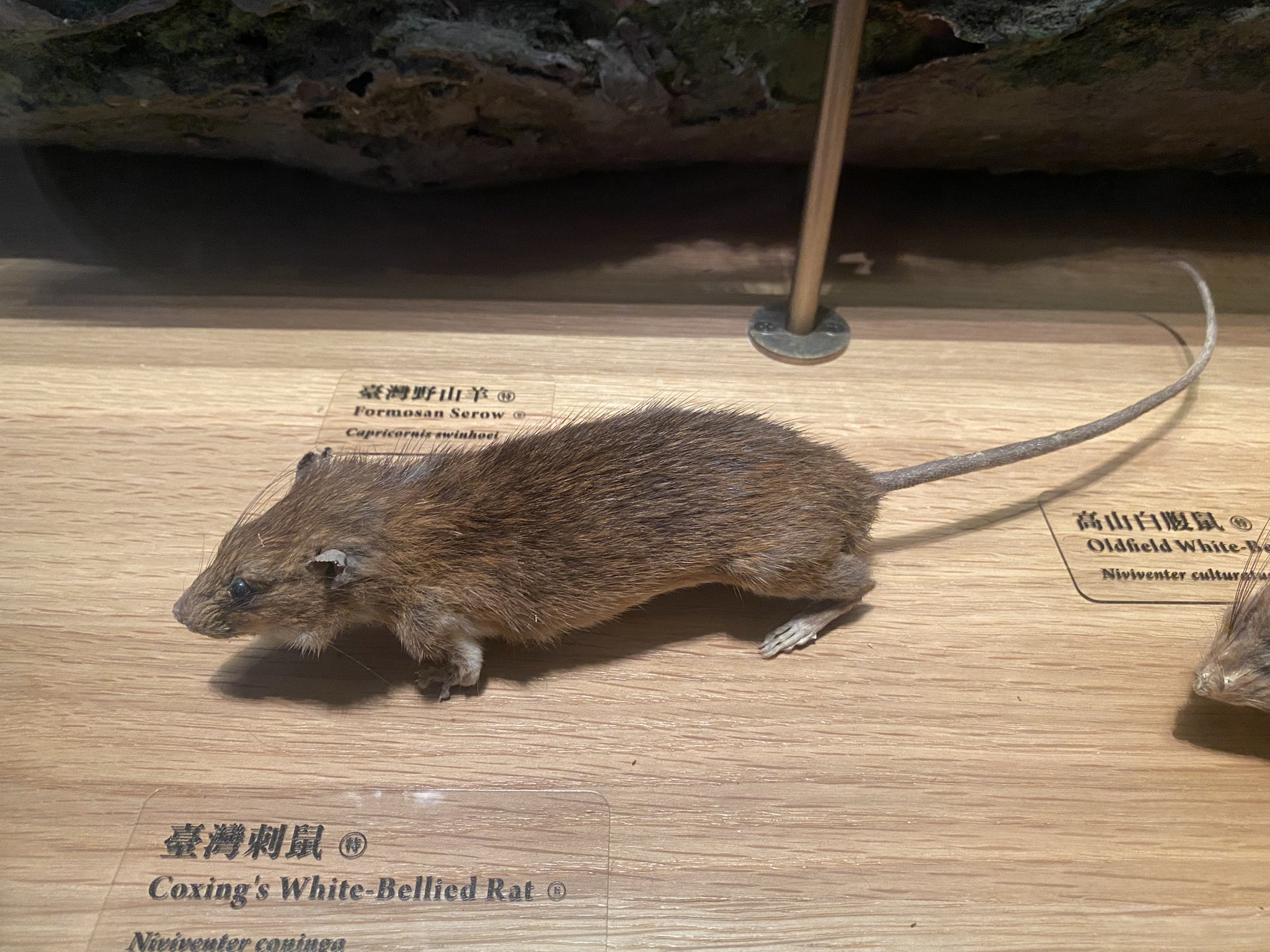

Conservation status
- Least Concern (IUCN 3.1)

Scientific classification
- Kingdom: Animalia
- Phylum: Chordata
- Class: Mammalia
- Order: Rodentia
- Family: Muridae
- Genus: Niviventer
- Species: N. coninga

Binomial name
- Niviventer coninga (R. Swinhoe, 1864)

Synonyms
- Niviventer coxinga (Swinhoe, 1871); Niviventer coxingi (Thomas, 1892)

= Coxing's white-bellied rat =

Species of rodent

Coxing's white-bellied rat (Niviventer coninga), also known as the spiny Taiwan niviventer, is a species of rodent in the family Muridae. The species was first described by Robert Swinhoe in 1864 and is endemic to Taiwan. It occurs in broad-leaf forests and their edges and in scrub. It is more common at elevations below 1,300 m (4,300 ft) but can be found up to 2,000 m (6,600 ft).
