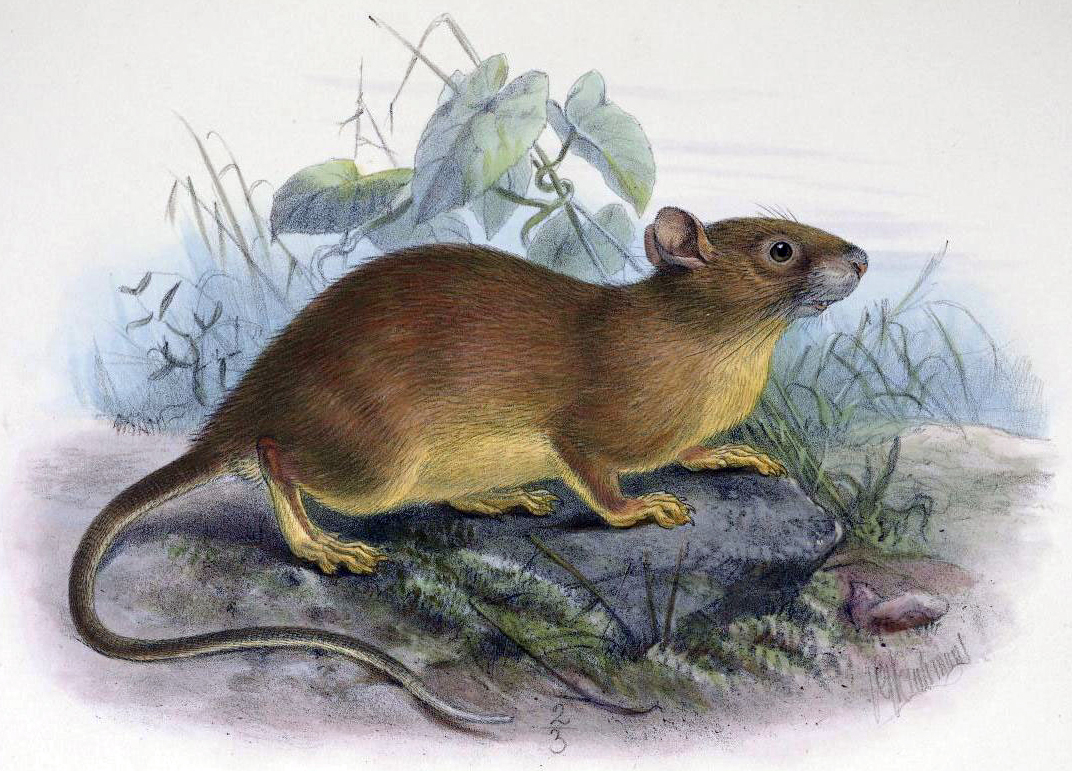

Conservation status
- Least Concern (IUCN 3.1)

Scientific classification
- Domain: Eukaryota
- Kingdom: Animalia
- Phylum: Chordata
- Class: Mammalia
- Order: Rodentia
- Family: Muridae
- Genus: Berylmys
- Species: B. bowersi

Binomial name
- Berylmys bowersi (Anderson, 1879)
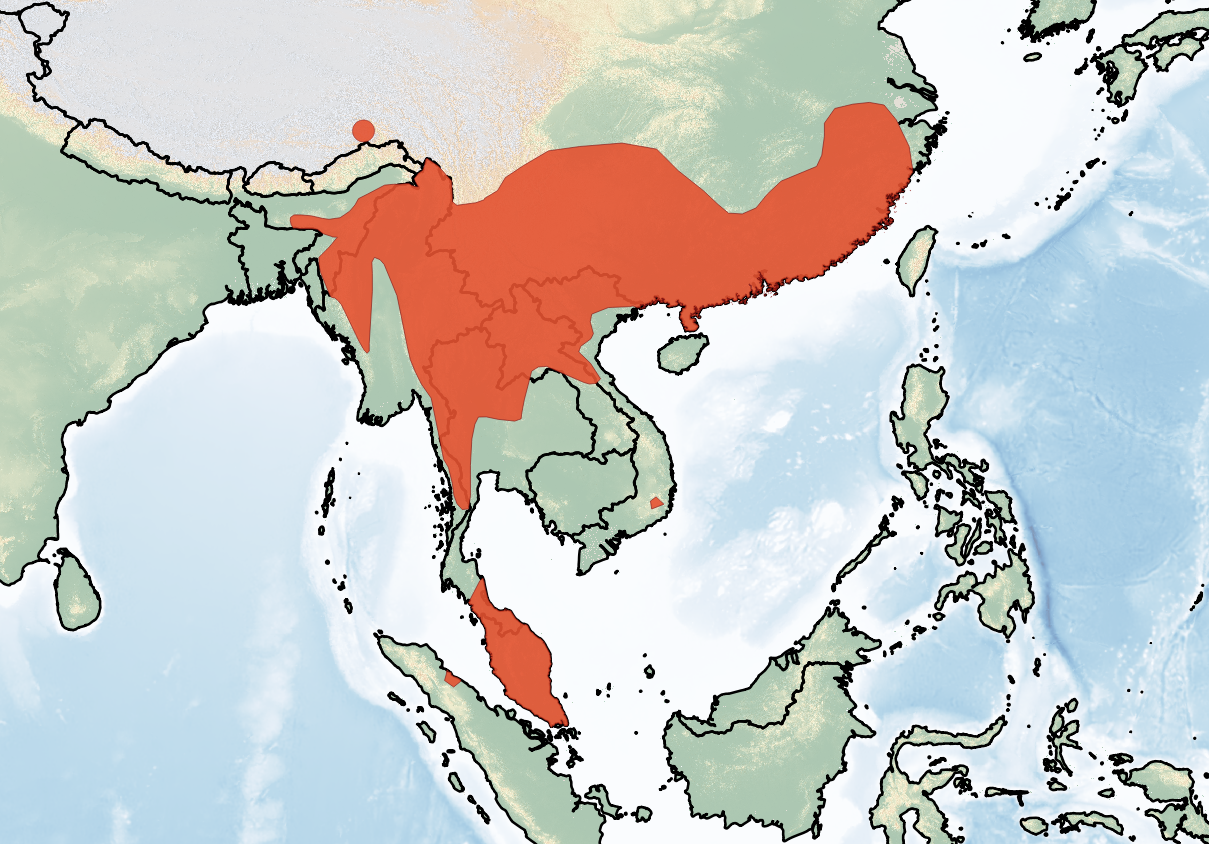

= Bower's white-toothed rat =

Species of rodent

Bower's white-toothed rat (Berylmys bowersi) is a species of rodent in the family Muridae native to southeast Asia.

== Distribution and habitat ==
The species is found in China, India, Indonesia, Laos, Malaysia, Myanmar, Thailand, and Vietnam. It occurs in a wide variety of habitats, including plantations, subtropical and montane forests, cultivated fields, shrubland, and disturbed forests. While patchily distributed, it is common and locally abundant.
