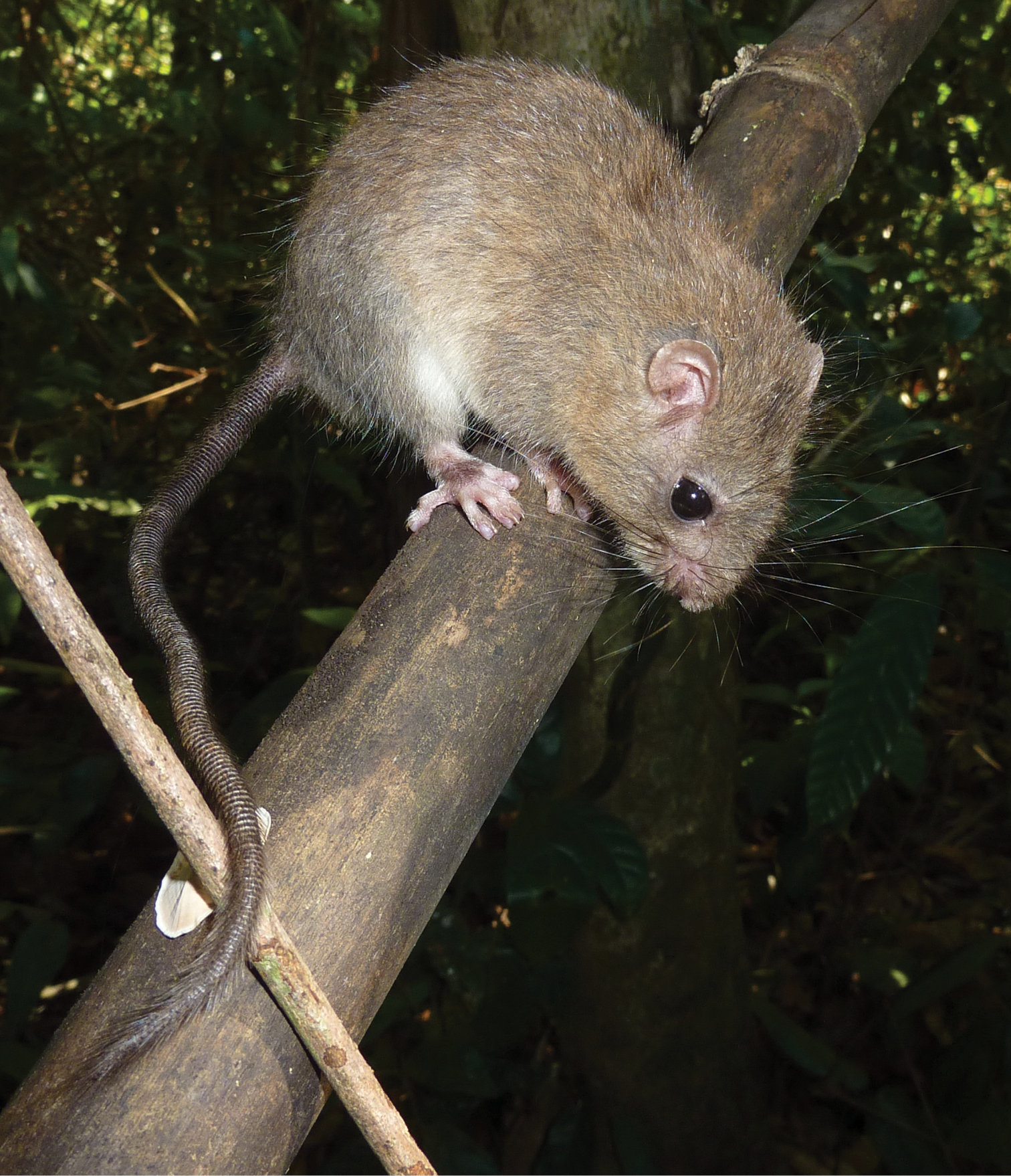
- Delacour's marmoset rat Bình Phước province (Southern Vietnam)

Conservation status
- Near Threatened (IUCN 3.1)

Scientific classification
- Kingdom: Animalia
- Phylum: Chordata
- Class: Mammalia
- Infraclass: Placentalia
- Order: Rodentia
- Family: Muridae
- Genus: Hapalomys
- Species: H. delacouri

Binomial name
- Hapalomys delacouri Thomas, 1927
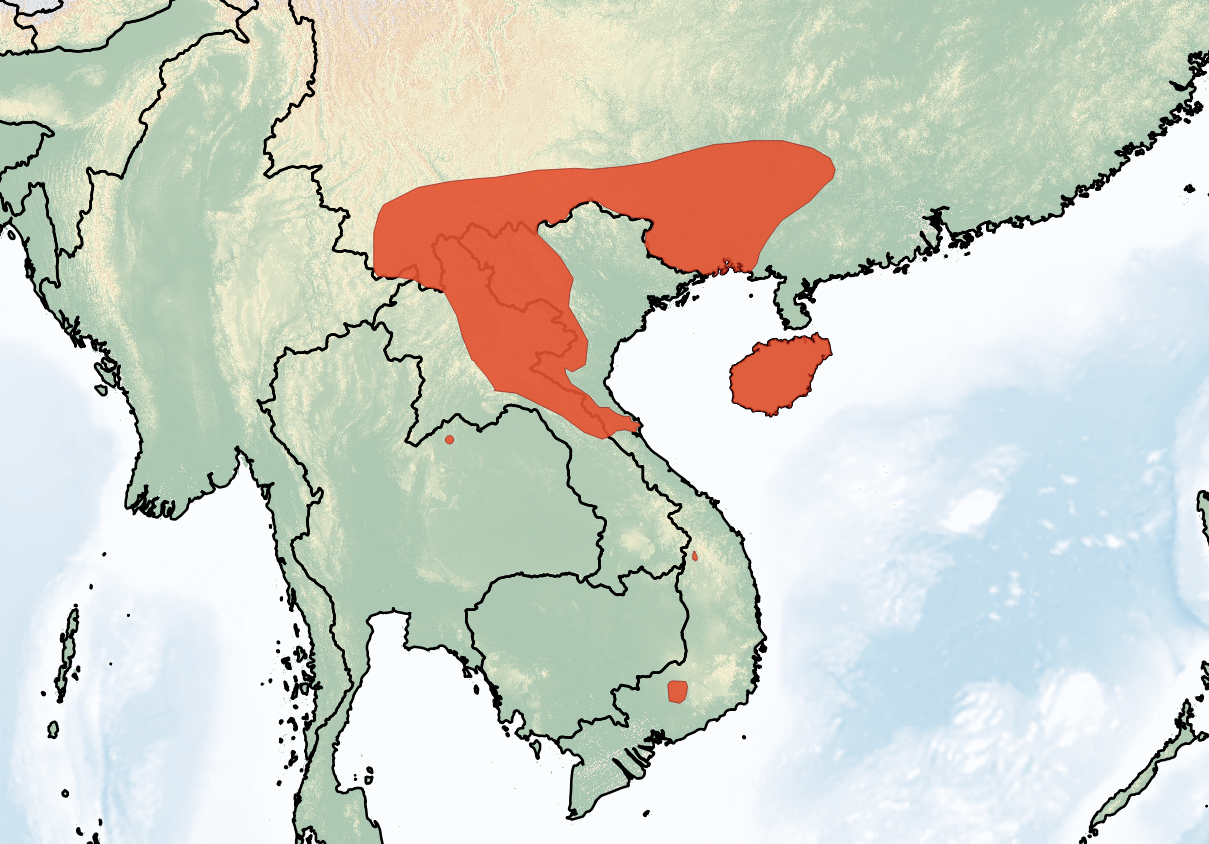

= Delacour's marmoset rat =

Species of rodent

Delacour's marmoset rat (Hapalomys delacouri), also known as the lesser marmoset rat, is an arboreal species of rodent in the family Muridae. It is found in China, Laos, and Vietnam. Its natural habitat is montane subtropical or tropical dry forest at elevations from 1,200 to 1,500 m (3,900 to 4,900 ft). It is threatened by habitat loss.
