= Marmoset rat =

Conservation status
- Endangered (IUCN 3.1)

Scientific classification
- Kingdom: Animalia
- Phylum: Chordata
- Class: Mammalia
- Infraclass: Placentalia
- Order: Rodentia
- Family: Muridae
- Genus: Hapalomys
- Species: H. longicaudatus

Binomial name
- Hapalomys longicaudatus Blyth, 1859
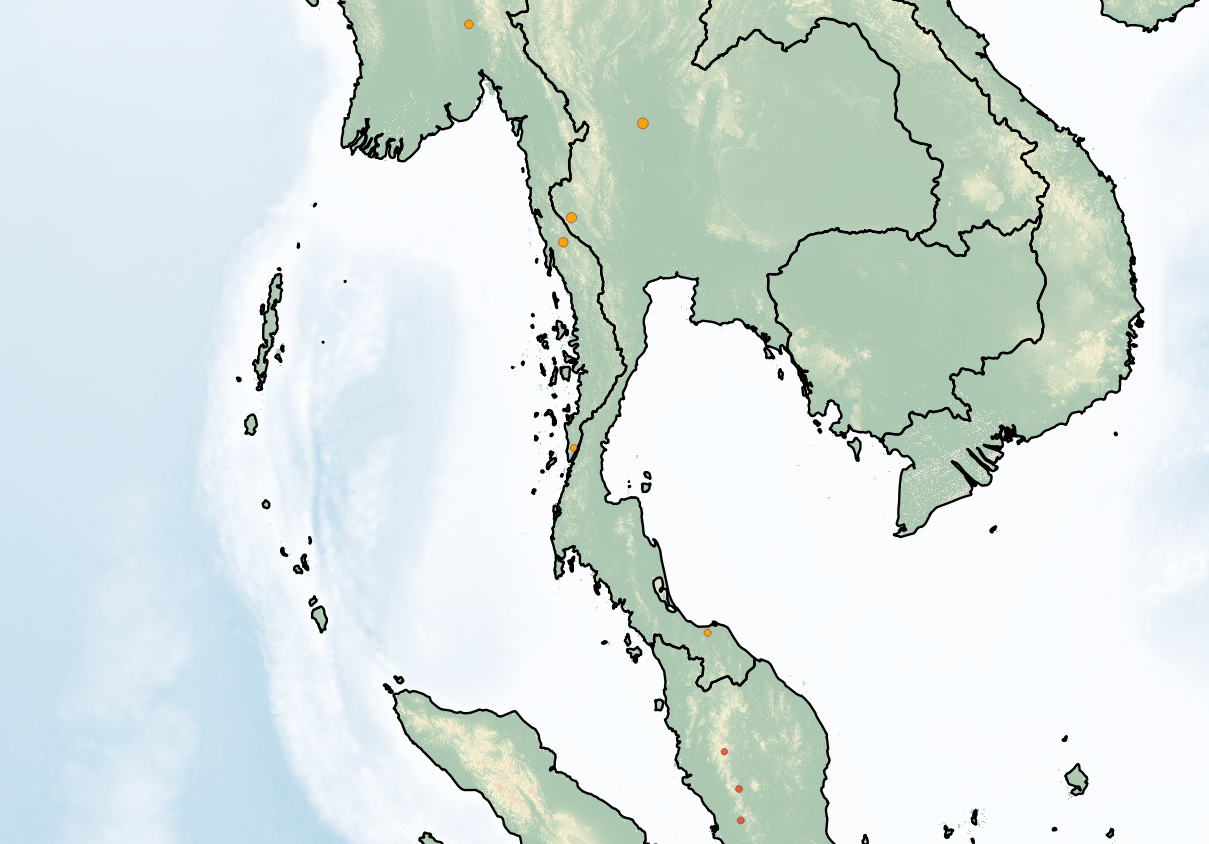

Species of rodent

The marmoset rat (Hapalomys longicaudatus), also known as the greater marmoset rat, is a species of rodent in the family Muridae. It is found in Malaysia, Myanmar, and Thailand. Its natural habitat is subtropical or tropical dry forests. It is threatened by habitat loss.

== See also ==
List of mammals of Malaysia List of mammals of Myanmar List of mammals of Thailand
