= Tenasserim white-bellied rat =

Conservation status
- Least Concern (IUCN 3.1)

Scientific classification
- Kingdom: Animalia
- Phylum: Chordata
- Class: Mammalia
- Order: Rodentia
- Family: Muridae
- Genus: Niviventer
- Species: N. tenaster

Binomial name
- Niviventer tenaster (Thomas, 1916)
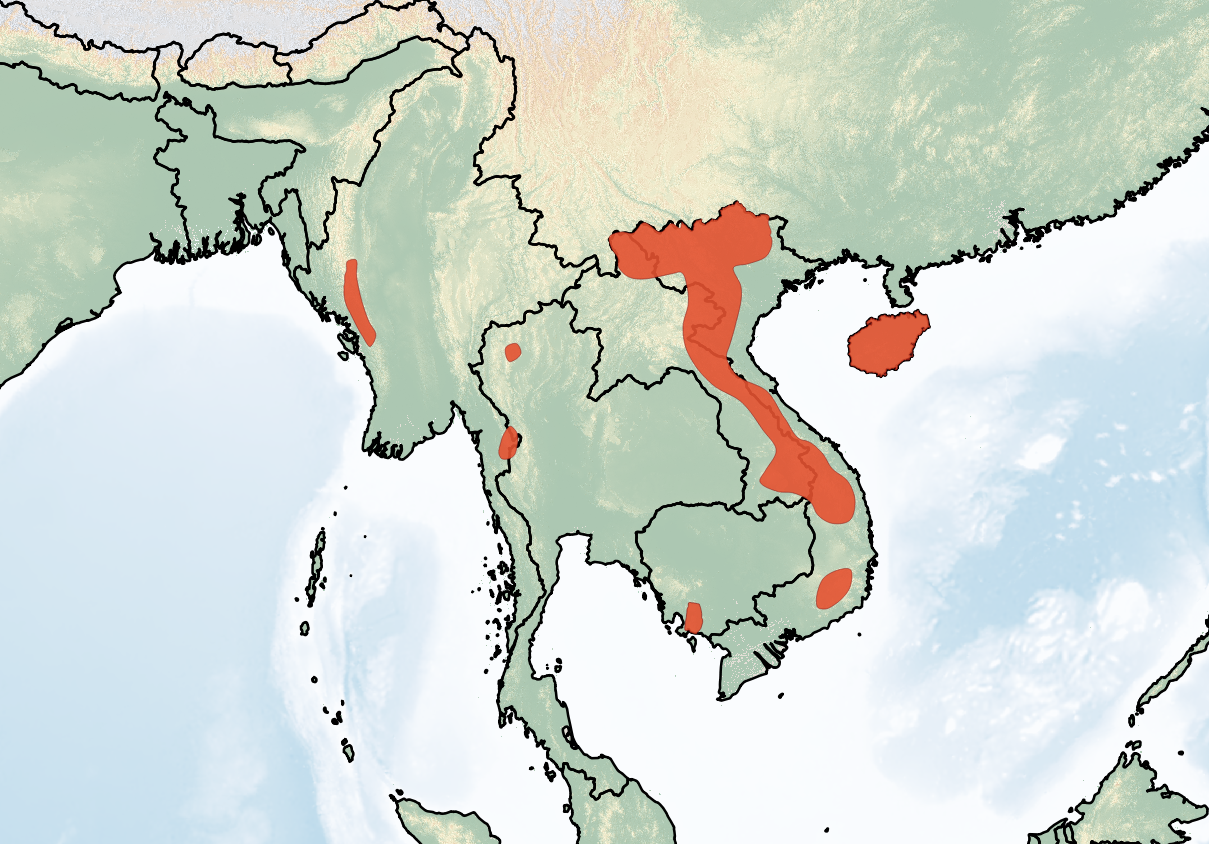

Species of rodent

The Tenasserim white-bellied rat (Niviventer tenaster) is a species of rodent in the family Muridae. It is named after the Tenasserim Hills and is found above 1,000 m in forested limestone mountainous areas. Its distribution includes India, Myanmar (Arakan Mountains, Dawna Range and the Bilauktaung range of the Tenasserim Hills), Thailand (Thanon Thong Chai Range), Cambodia (southern end of the Cardamom Mountains, Laos and Vietnam (Annamite Range), and China (southern Yunnan and Hainan).
