= Brahma white-bellied rat =

Conservation status
- Least Concern (IUCN 3.1)

Scientific classification
- Kingdom: Animalia
- Phylum: Chordata
- Class: Mammalia
- Order: Rodentia
- Family: Muridae
- Genus: Niviventer
- Species: N. brahma

Binomial name
- Niviventer brahma (Thomas, 1914)
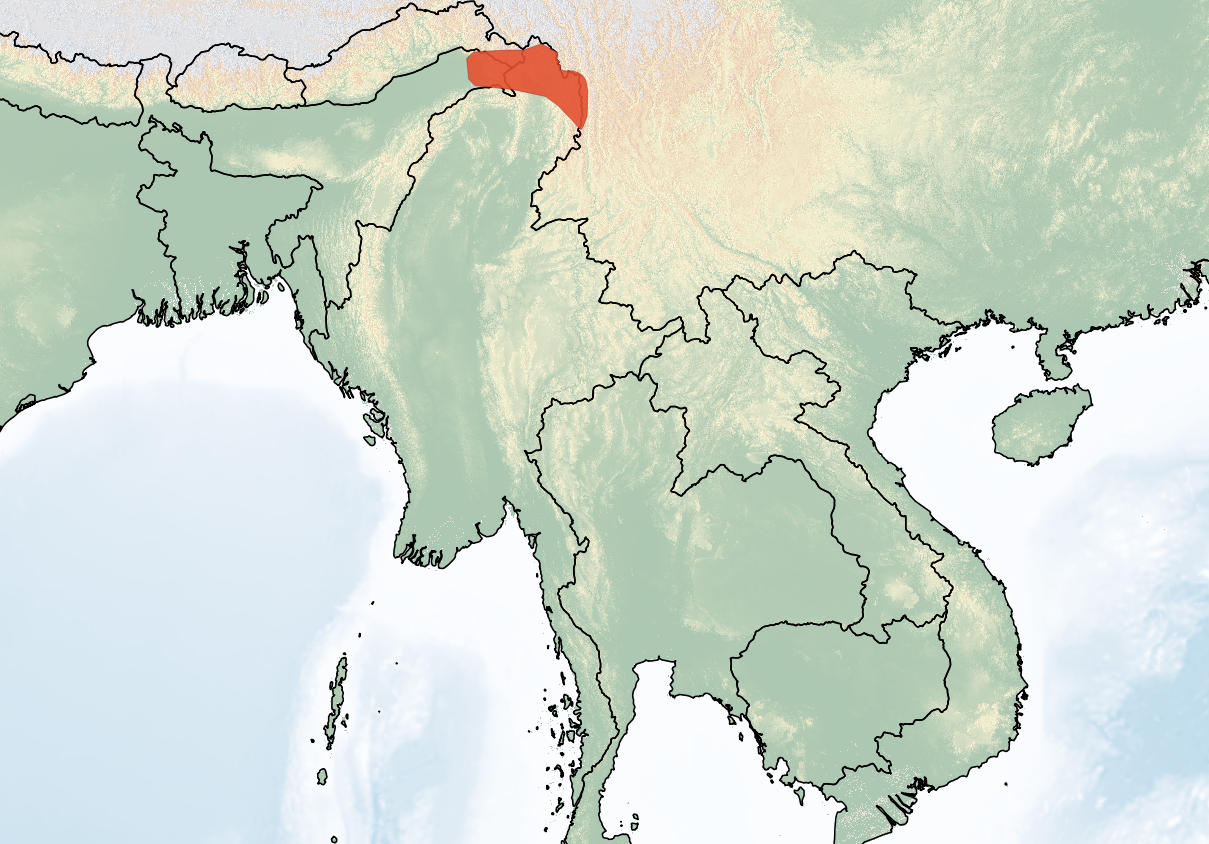

Species of rodent

The Brahma white-bellied rat (Niviventer brahma) is a species of rodent in the family Muridae. It is found in northeastern India, northern Myanmar, and southwestern China (Yunnan). It lives in various forest habitats at elevations of 2,000–2,800 m (6,600–9,200 ft) above sea level.
