= Lang Bian white-bellied rat =

Conservation status
- Least Concern (IUCN 3.1)

Scientific classification
- Kingdom: Animalia
- Phylum: Chordata
- Class: Mammalia
- Order: Rodentia
- Family: Muridae
- Genus: Niviventer
- Species: N. langbianis

Binomial name
- Niviventer langbianis (Robinson & Kloss, 1922)
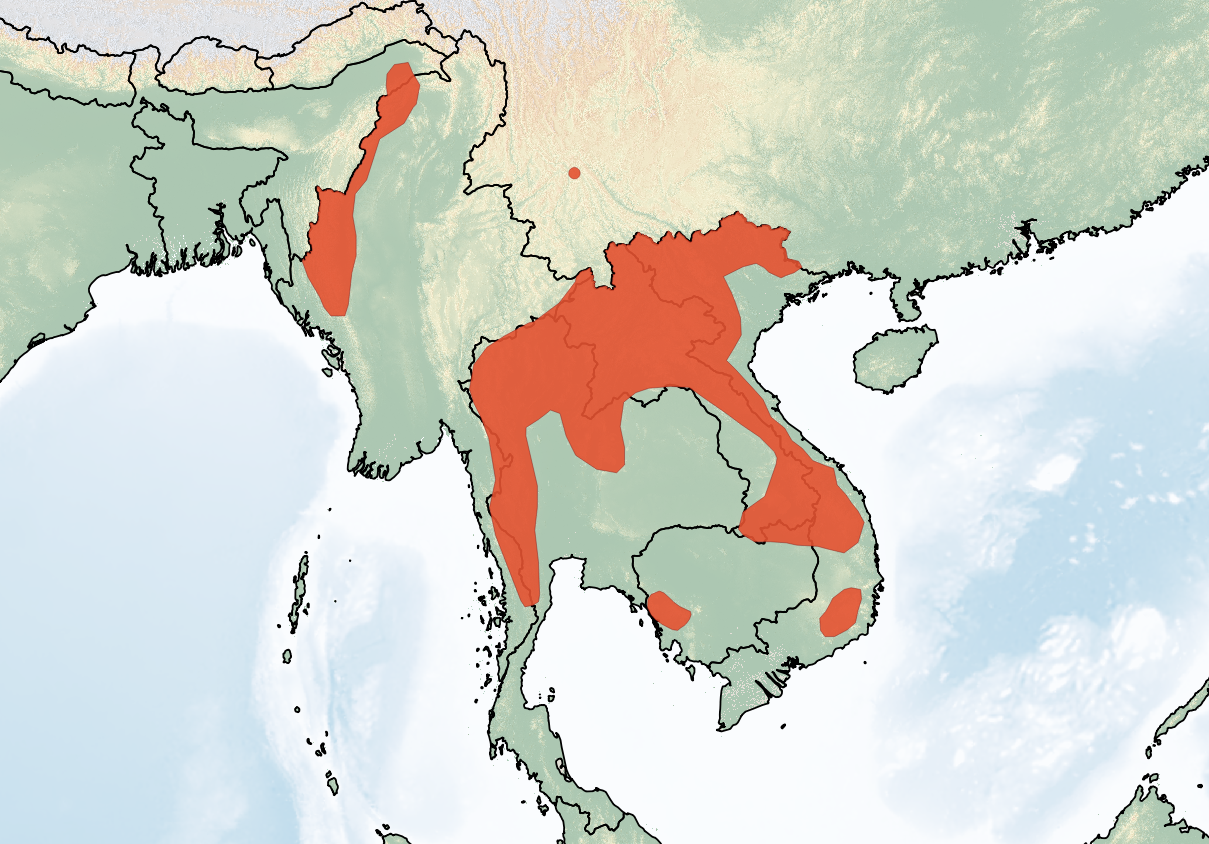

Species of rodent

The Lang Bian white-bellied rat (Niviventer langbianis) is a species of rodent in the family Muridae. It is found in India, Laos, Myanmar, Thailand, and Vietnam.
