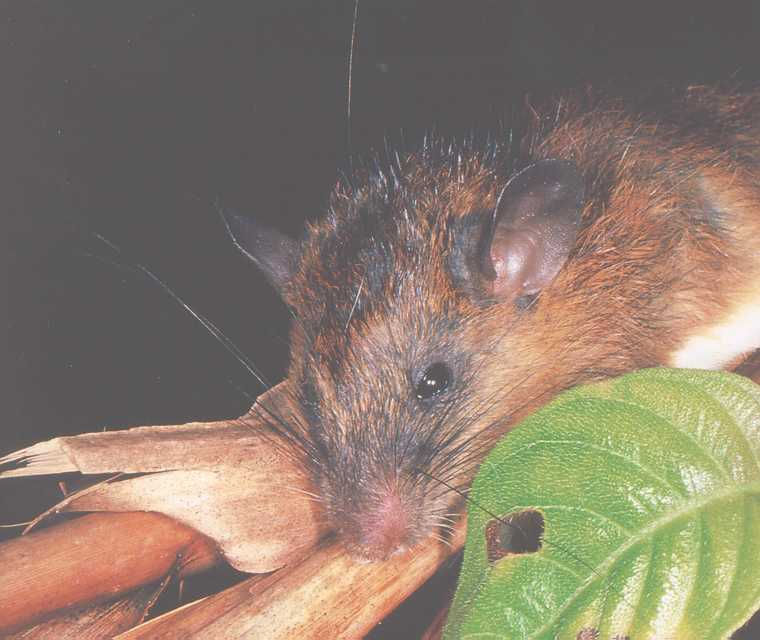

Conservation status
- Least Concern (IUCN 3.1)

Scientific classification
- Kingdom: Animalia
- Phylum: Chordata
- Class: Mammalia
- Order: Rodentia
- Family: Muridae
- Genus: Niviventer
- Species: N. cremoriventer

Binomial name
- Niviventer cremoriventer (Miller, 1900)
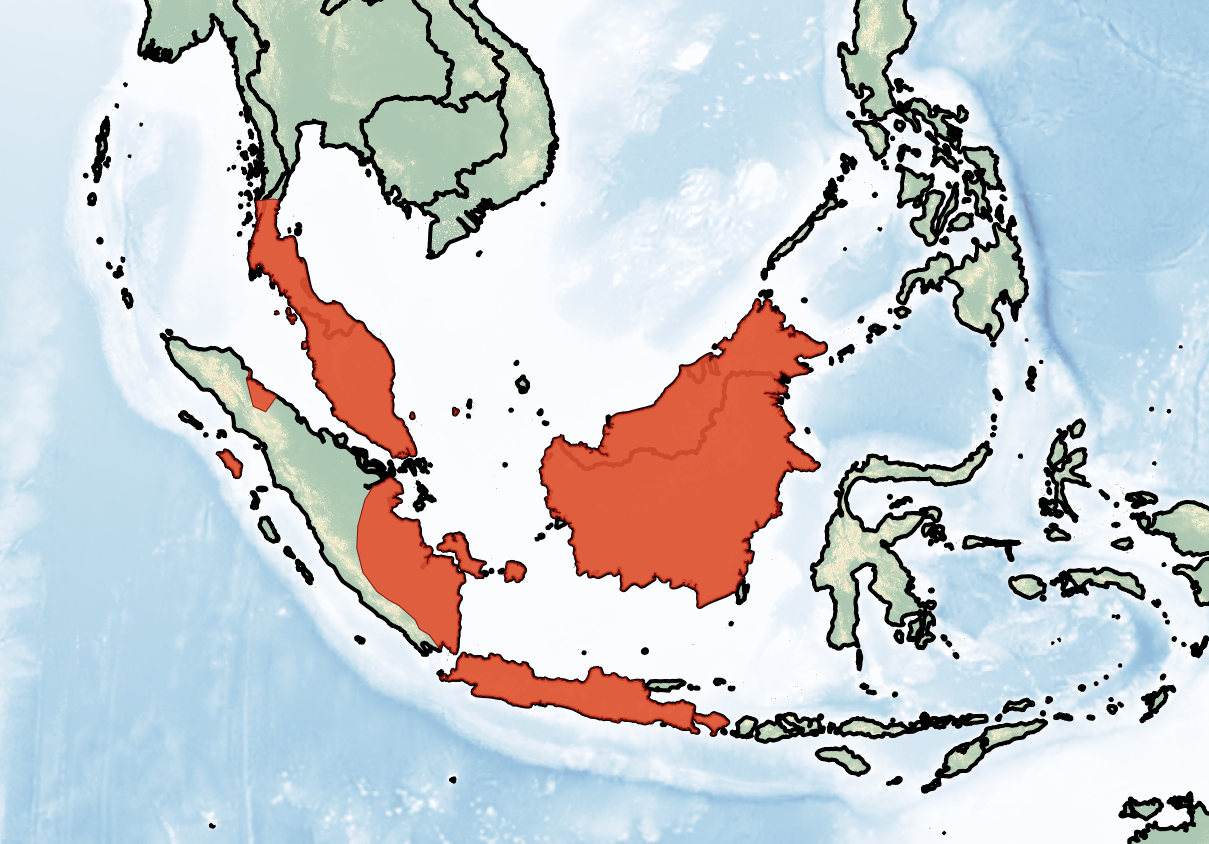

= Dark-tailed tree rat =

Species of rodent

The dark-tailed tree rat or Sundaic arboreal niviventer (Niviventer cremoriventer) is a species of rodent in the family Muridae. It is found on the Malay Peninsula (Thailand, Malaysia), including some offshore islands (Myanmar: Mergui Archipelago), and in parts of the Malay Archipelago (Singapore; Indonesia: Anambas Islands, Sumatra, Nias, Belitung (=Billiton), Bangka Island, Java, Bali; Borneo and some its offshore islands). It might be a species complex.

Dark-tailed tree rat is a common species that lives both arboreally and on the ground in primary forest habitats and also secondary wooded habitats, but not outside forests. Such habitats are being lost, especially in the lowland areas, representing a threat to this species.
