= Scully's tube-nosed bat =

Conservation status
- Data Deficient (IUCN 3.1)

Scientific classification
- Kingdom: Animalia
- Phylum: Chordata
- Class: Mammalia
- Order: Chiroptera
- Family: Vespertilionidae
- Genus: Murina
- Species: M. tubinaris

Binomial name
- Murina tubinaris Scully, 1881

Species of bat

Scully's tube-Nosed bat (Murina tubinaris) is a species of vesper bat in the family Vespertilionidae. It can be found in the following countries: India, Laos, Myanmar, Pakistan, Thailand, and Vietnam.

Members of the ashy-gray tube-nosed bat species were formerly classified as Scully's bats.
