= Manipur white-toothed rat =

Conservation status
- Least Concern (IUCN 3.1)

Scientific classification
- Kingdom: Animalia
- Phylum: Chordata
- Class: Mammalia
- Order: Rodentia
- Family: Muridae
- Genus: Berylmys
- Species: B. manipulus

Binomial name
- Berylmys manipulus (Thomas, 1916)
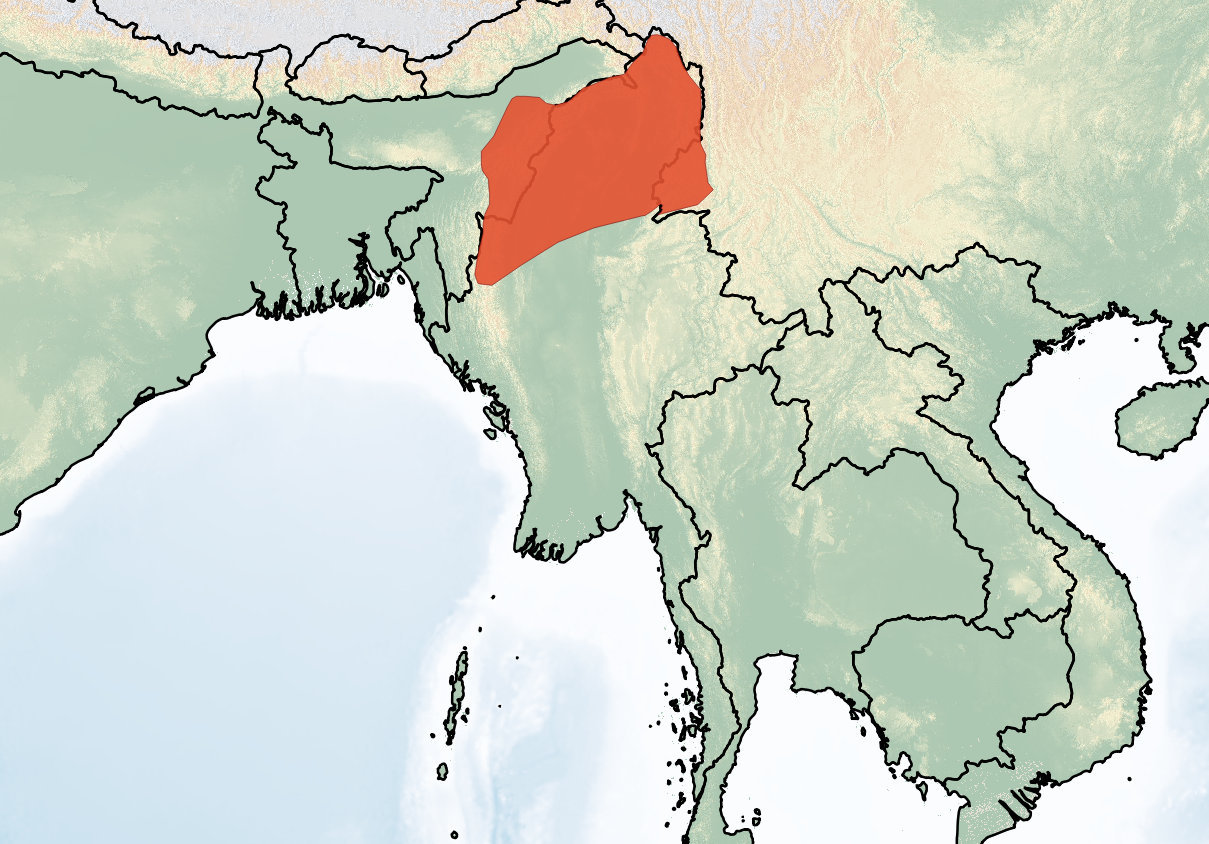

Species of rodent

The Manipur white-toothed rat (Berylmys manipulus) is a species of rodent in the family Muridae. It is found in China, India, and Myanmar.

The Manipur white-toothed rat is found in northeastern India, northern and central Myanmar, and Yunnan province of China (west of the Salween River). In India, it is found in Golaghat, Assam; the Kekrima Hills and Naga Hills of Nagaland; Bishenpur, Senapati, and Imphal districts of Manipur.
