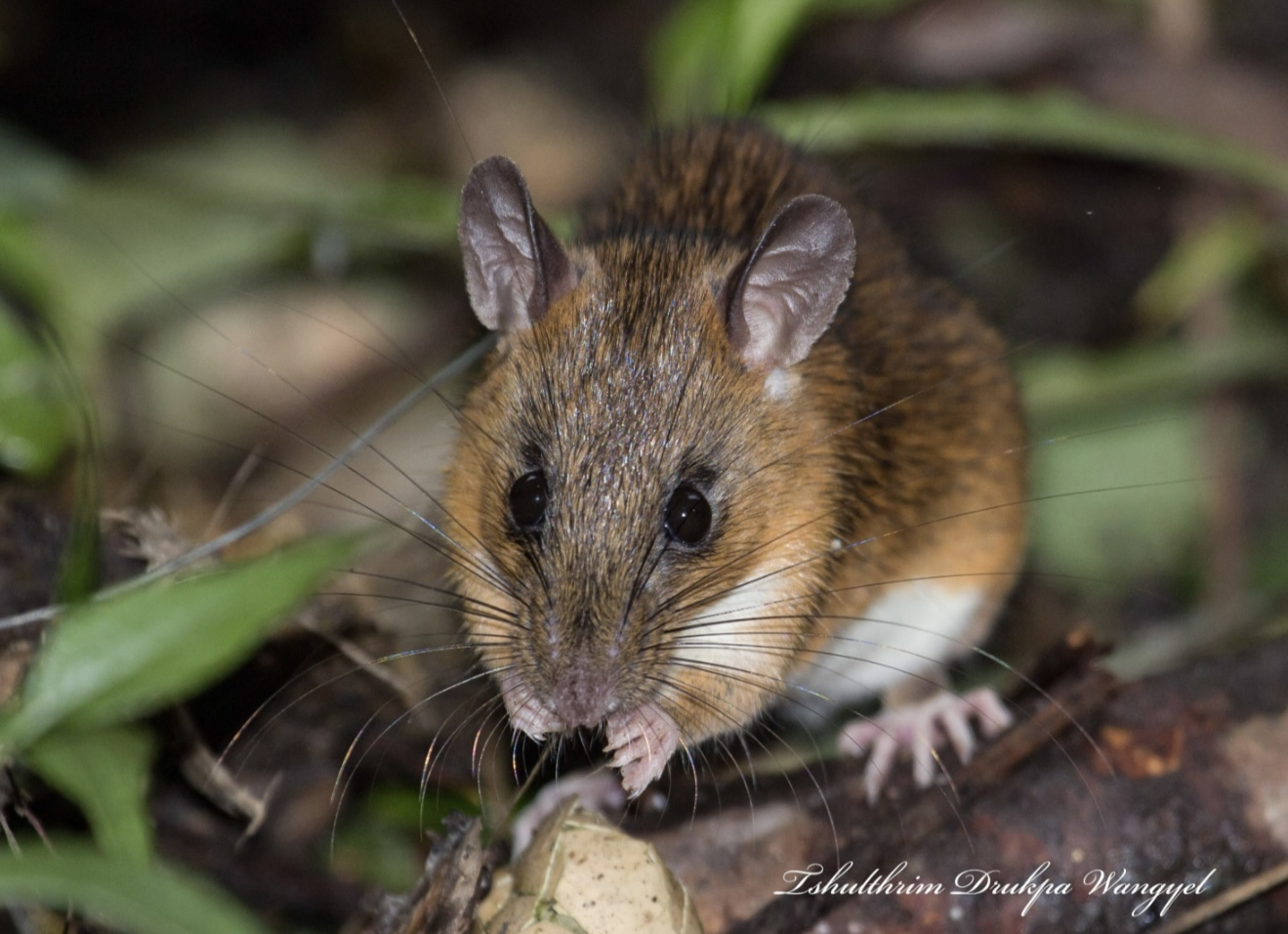

Conservation status
- Least Concern (IUCN 3.1)

Scientific classification
- Kingdom: Animalia
- Phylum: Chordata
- Class: Mammalia
- Order: Rodentia
- Family: Muridae
- Genus: Niviventer
- Species: N. niviventer

Binomial name
- Niviventer niviventer (Hodgson, 1836)

= White-bellied rat =

Species of rodent

The white-bellied rat (Niviventer niviventer) is a species of rodent in the family Muridae.

It is found in India, Nepal, Bhutan and Pakistan.
