= Smoke-bellied rat =

Conservation status
- Least Concern (IUCN 3.1)

Scientific classification
- Kingdom: Animalia
- Phylum: Chordata
- Class: Mammalia
- Order: Rodentia
- Family: Muridae
- Genus: Niviventer
- Species: N. eha

Binomial name
- Niviventer eha (Wroughton, 1916)
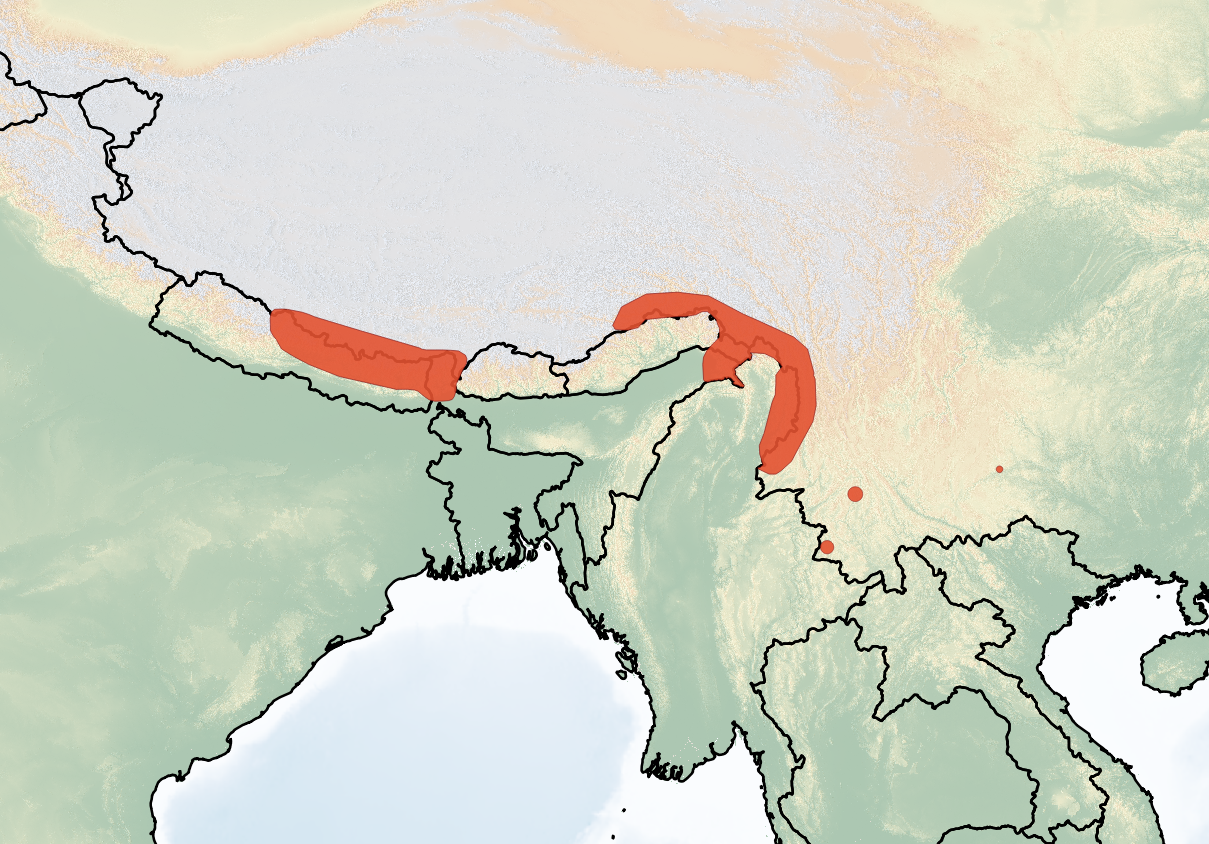

Species of rodent

The smoke-bellied rat (Niviventer eha) is a species of rodent in the family Muridae. It is found in China, India, Myanmar, and Nepal.
