= Kenneth's white-toothed rat =

Conservation status
- Least Concern (IUCN 3.1)

Scientific classification
- Kingdom: Animalia
- Phylum: Chordata
- Class: Mammalia
- Order: Rodentia
- Family: Muridae
- Genus: Berylmys
- Species: B. mackenziei

Binomial name
- Berylmys mackenziei (Thomas, 1916)
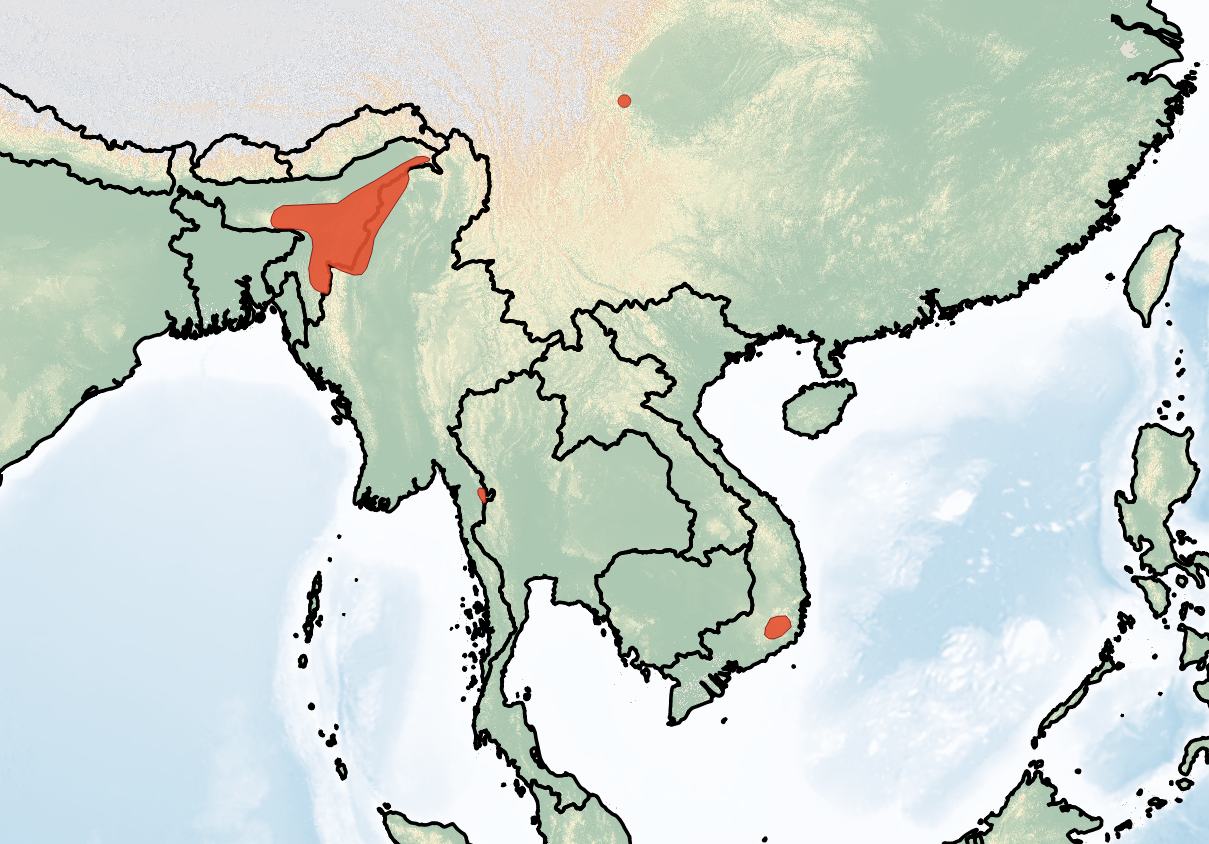

Species of rodent

Kenneth's white-toothed rat (Berylmys mackenziei) is a species of rodent in the family Muridae. It is found in China, India, Myanmar, and Vietnam.
