= Small white-toothed rat =

Conservation status
- Least Concern (IUCN 3.1)

Scientific classification
- Domain: Eukaryota
- Kingdom: Animalia
- Phylum: Chordata
- Class: Mammalia
- Order: Rodentia
- Family: Muridae
- Genus: Berylmys
- Species: B. berdmorei

Binomial name
- Berylmys berdmorei (Blyth, 1851)
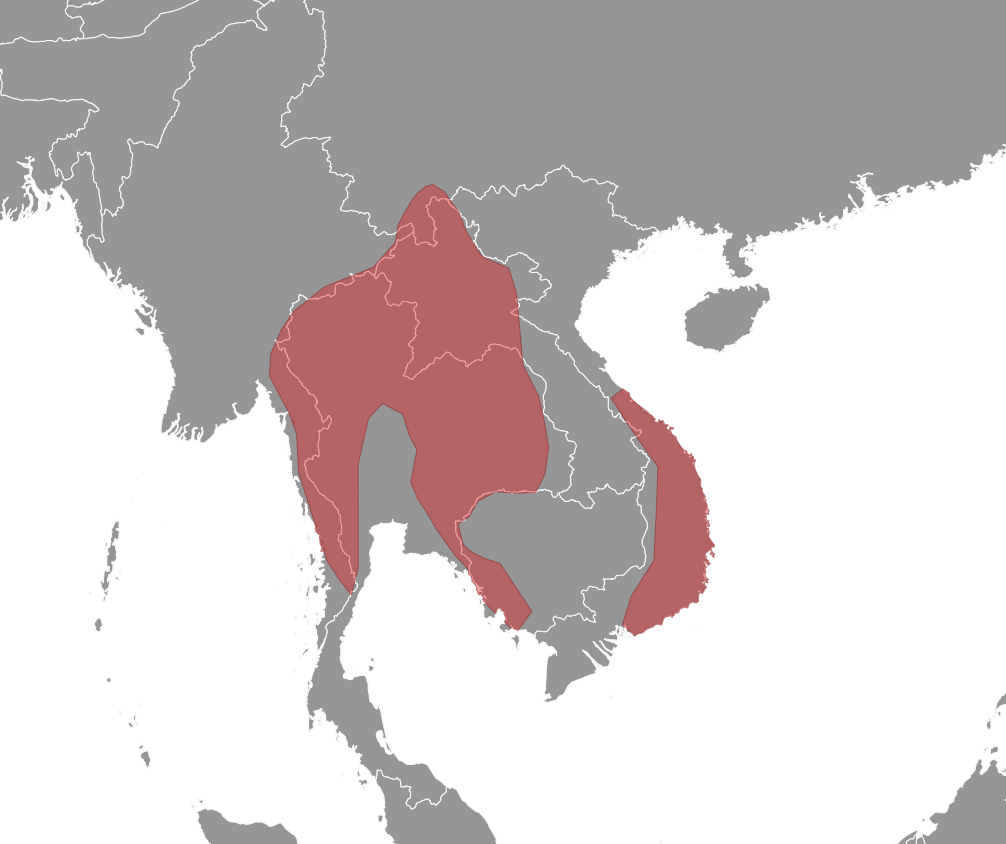

Species of rodent

The small white-toothed rat (Berylmys berdmorei) is a species of rodent in the family Muridae. It is found in Cambodia, Laos, Myanmar, Thailand, and Vietnam.
