= Chinese white-bellied rat =

- Dead specimens

Conservation status
- Least Concern (IUCN 3.1)

Scientific classification
- Kingdom: Animalia
- Phylum: Chordata
- Class: Mammalia
- Order: Rodentia
- Family: Muridae
- Genus: Niviventer
- Species: N. confucianus

Binomial name
- Niviventer confucianus (Milne-Edwards, 1871)
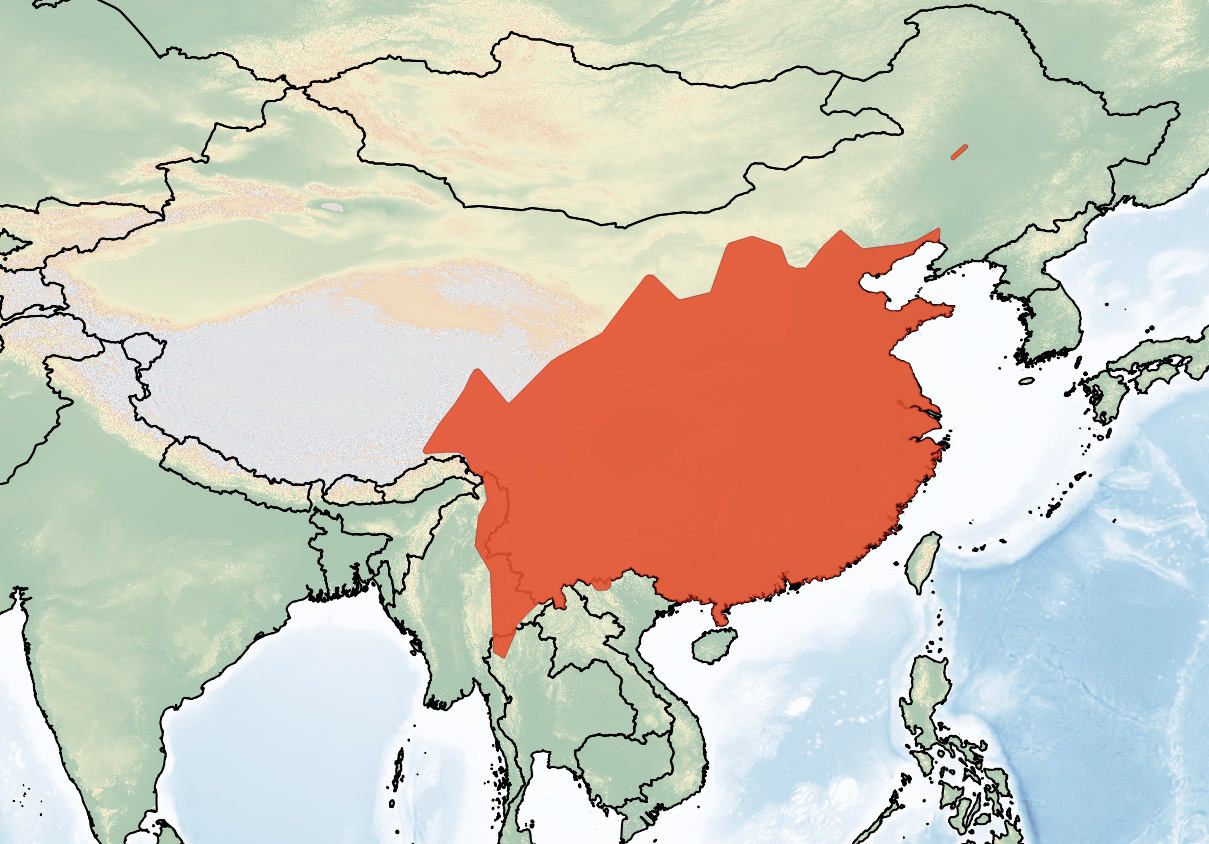

Species of rodent

The Chinese white-bellied rat (Niviventer confucianus) is a species of rodent in the family Muridae. It is widely spread in China and also occurs in northern Myanmar, northwest Thailand, and northwest Vietnam. It might also occur in northern Laos.
