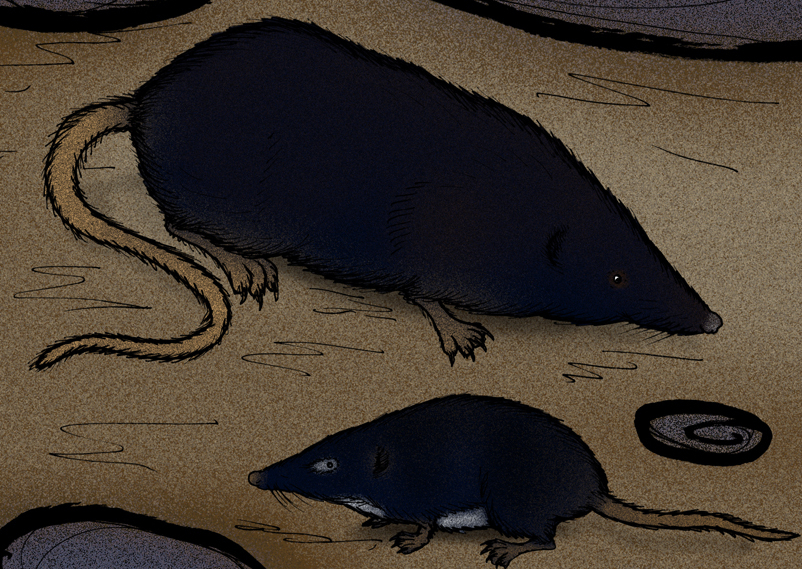
- Size comparison of the Balearic shrew Nesiotites hidalgo (top) with a water shrew (Neomys, below)

Scientific classification
- Kingdom: Animalia
- Phylum: Chordata
- Class: Mammalia
- Infraclass: Placentalia
- Order: Eulipotyphla
- Family: Soricidae
- Tribe: Nectogalini
- Genus: †Nesiotites; Bate, 1945

Species
- †N. hidalgo Bate, 1945 (type); †N. meloussae Pons and Moyà, 1980; †N. ponsi Reumer, 1979; †N. rafelinensis? Rofes et al, 2012

= Nesiotites =

Nesiotites Temporal range: Early Pliocene–Holocene

Extinct genus of shrew native to the Balearic Islands

Nesiotites is an extinct genus of large red-toothed shrews belonging to the tribe Nectogalini that inhabited the Balearic Islands from the latest Miocene/Early Pliocene (from around 5.3 million years ago) up until the arrival of humans on the islands during the late Holocene (around 2500-2300 BC). It was present on Mallorca and Menorca. It represented one of only 3 native land mammals to the islands at the time of human arrival, alongside the dwarf goat-antelope Myotragus and the giant dormouse Hypnomys. The genus is closely related to the also recently extinct Corsican-Sardinian shrews belonging to the genus Asoriculus, with their closest living relatives being the Himalayan shrews of the genus Soriculus.

== Taxonomy ==
Nesiotites was originally described by Dorothea Bate in 1945, with the type species being Nesiotites hidalgo. Originally, two species from the islands of Corsica and Sardinia (N. corsicanus and N. similis) were included in the genus, but these are now rejected from the genus, and Nesiotites is now generally used exclusively for the Balearic species, as otherwise the genus would likely be polyphyletic.

The genus includes the chronospecies N. rafelinensis (earliest Pliocene) (the validity of this species disputed, as some authors contend that it is not morphologically distinct from N. ponsi) N. ponsi (Late Pliocene), N. meloussae/N. aff. ponsi (Early Pleistocene) and N. hidalgo (Middle Pleistocene-Holocene). These are largely distinguished by differences in body size, and to a lesser extent differences in the shape of the teeth, though whether dental characters are distinguishing traits between different Nesiotites species has been questioned.

Based on a mitochondrial genome from Nesiotites hidalgo, their closest living relative is the terrestrial Soriculus shrews native to the Himalayas and surrounding areas, and related to other terrestrial nectogaline shrews known from Asia (Episoriculus and Chodsigoa), rather than to the nectogaline water shrews (Chimarrogale, Nectogale and Neomys). A molecular clock analysis suggests that Himalayan shrews and Balearic shrews genetically diverged approximately 6.44 million years ago. Based on morphological data, it is thought that Nesiotites is closely related and likely descended from the extinct genus Asoriculus, known from the Late Miocene-Holocene of Europe and North Africa, which now includes the Corsican and Sardinian species formerly included in Nesiotites.

Position of Nesiotites within Nectogalini based on DNA and morphological characters after Bover et al. (2018):

- Nectogalini
  - Episoriculus fumidus
  - - - - Chimarrogale himalayica (Himalayan water shrew)
        - Nectogale elegans (elegant water shrew)
      - Neomys
        - Neomys fodiens (water shrew)
        - †Neomys newtoni
    - - - Soriculus nigrescens (Himalayan shrew)
        - - †Nesiotites hidalgo
          - †Asoriculus gibberodon
      - - Episoriculus
          - - Episoriculus leucops
            - Episoriculus caudatus
          - Episoriculus macrurus
        - Chodsigoa
          - - Chodsigoa parca
            - Chodsigoa sodalis
          - Chodsigoa hypsibia

== Description ==
Members of Nesiotites exhibited a large body size compared to their likely mainland ancestor, Asoriculus gibberodon (estimated to weigh 8.85 grams (0.312 oz)), as well to most other members of Nectogalini, an example of island gigantism. The species of the genus showed an increase in body size over time. A 2016 study estimated that N. ponsi weighed about 14.58 grams (0.514 oz) while the last species, N. hildalgo was estimated at 26.63–29.31 grams (0.939–1.034 oz), while a later 2026 study estimated N. ponsi weighed about 25–29 grams (0.88–1.02 oz), while N. hidalgo weighed around 28–41 grams (0.99–1.45 oz), being exceeded in size amongst Nectogalini only by Asiatic water shrews (Chimarrogale).

The number of upper antemolars (the teeth between the incisors and the premolars) varies between three and four. The morphology of the teeth is somewhat variable. Most of the skull is unknown as is typical of fossil shrews, due to the thinness of many of the skull bones, though the skulls displays a number of features common to the skulls of nectogaline shrews, including "(1) a strongly domed cranial vault elevated above the rostrum; (2) a postglenoid process forming a disc with a central opening; (3) a slightly concave or straight anterior [forward] margin of the nasal bones; (4) in lateral [side-on] view, a kinked rostrum above U1 [the first unicuspid tooth, another name for antemolars, a kind of tooth found between the incisors and the premolars in shrews], elevated compared to Sorex; (5) a straight (non-indented) lower margin of the articular process [also called the condylar processes, a posteriorly directed extension at the back of the lower jaw] in buccal view [from viewed within the jaw looking outwards]; (6) a narrow bony bridge connecting the articular surfaces of the condyle in caudal view; (7) a strongly curved anterior cusp of the upper incisor, directed anteriorly and inferiorly; (8) no more than four upper unicuspids, the last of which (when present) is minute and single-rooted; (9) elongated posterior margins of the remaining unicuspids in lateral view, with tips pointing posteriorly and supported by two roots; (10) a single, weakly defined cusp on the cutting edge of the lower incisor; and (11) teeth with slightly pigmented or unpigmented tips."

The later, large species have proportionally more robust (thicker relative to length) limb bones, which are highly robust in comparison to most modern shrews. The length of the olecranon (a protruding section of the ulna that forms part of the elbow joint) of Nesiotites species is very short, among the shortest known in shrews. The sacrum and pelvis is usually unfused, as is typical of shews, but has been found fused in some N. hidalgo individuals.

== Ecology ==
The bone proportions of Nesiotites species fall within the range of living ground-dwelling terrestrial (ambulatory) shews, and do not appear to display any clear adaptations to digging or other specialised ecologies like running, maintaining a relatively generalised terrestrial ecology similar to most living shrews. Species of Nesiotites may have had a longer lifespan than most living shrews, perhaps 3-4 years instead of the 1-2 years typical of living shrews. Like living shrews, it was probably primarily an insectivore that preyed on invertebrates, or possibly sometimes small vertebrates given its relatively large size.

== Evolutionary history ==
Nesiotites originally colonised Mallorca during the Messinian stage of the Late Miocene, when during the Messinian salinity crisis (5.96–5.33 million years ago) the Mediterranean sea evaporated allowing animals from the Iberian Peninsula to disperse to the Balearics. Later becoming isolated on the island when the Mediterranean refilled as result of the Zanclean Flood around 5.3 million years ago, at the beginning of the Pliocene. Nesiotites later spread to Menorca during the Pliocene-Pleistocene transition, when episodes of low sea level connected the two islands. During most of its existence, it represented only one of three terrestrial mammal lineages native to the Balearic islands, alongside the giant dormouse Hypnomys and the dwarf goat-antelope Myotragus. The last Nesiotites chronospecies, N. hidalgo, probably became extinct shortly after human settlement of the Balearics, which occurred sometime prior to 2282 BC, with the youngest radiocarbon date for the species dating to approximately 3027 BC.
