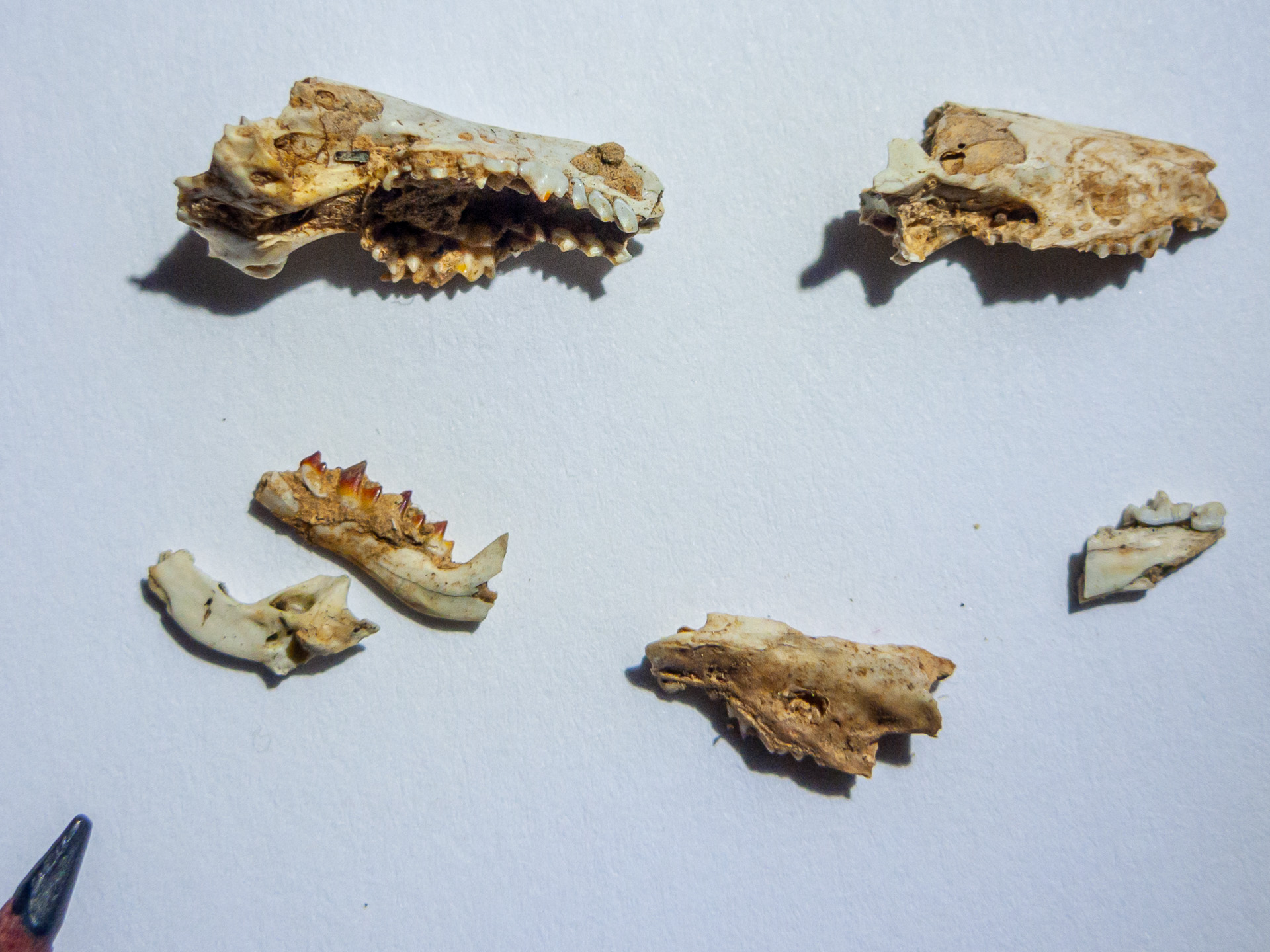
- Jaw and skull fragments of Asoriculus corsicanus, with a pencil tip (bottom left) for scale.

Scientific classification
- Kingdom: Animalia
- Phylum: Chordata
- Class: Mammalia
- Order: Eulipotyphla
- Family: Soricidae
- Tribe: Nectogalini
- Genus: †Asoriculus; Kretzoi, 1959

Type species
- †Crocidura gibberodon Petényi, 1864

Species
- †A. burgioi Masini & Sarà, 1998; †A. corsicanus (Bate, 1945); †A. gibberodon (Petényi, 1864); †A. similis (Hensel, 1855); †A. maghrebiensis Rzebik-Kowalska, 1988; †A. thenii Malez and Rabeder, 1984

= Asoriculus =

Asoriculus Temporal range: Messinian–Holocene

Extinct genus of red-toothed shrew

Asoriculus is an extinct genus of terrestrial shrews in the subfamily Soricinae (red-toothed shrews) and tribe Nectogalini, native to Europe (including the islands of Corsica, Sardinia and Sicily) West Asia and North Africa, from the Late Miocene (from around 6 million years ago) until the late Holocene (likely the late 1st millennium BC). The genus is closely related and probably ancestral to the also recently-extinct Balearic shrews (Nesiotites), with their closest living relative being the Soriculus shrews native to the Himalayas and surrounding areas.

== Taxonomy and evolution ==
The number of valid species in the genus is uncertain and subject to dispute. The best known species of Asoriculus, Asoriculus gibberodon, was widespread in Europe from the Late Miocene (Messinian, MN13, from around 7.2-5.3 million years ago) to the Early Pleistocene, and was also present in Anatolia and the Caucasus during the Pliocene. The youngest records of the species date to the end of the Early Pleistocene approximately 846,000 ± 57,000 years ago in the Iberian Peninsula. Another larger species, A. thenii, is sometimes also recognised in the Early Pleistocene of Europe. The species Asoriculus maghrebiensis is known from the Pliocene-Pleistocene boundary (c. 2.5 million years ago) of Morocco in North Africa, making it the only known member of Soricinae to have been native to the African continent.

Insular species are known from the Mediterranean islands of Sicily (A. burgioi Late Pliocene-Early Pleistocene), and Corsica-Sardinia including A. corsicanus (Late Pliocene-Early Pleistocene) and A. similis (Early Pleistocene-Late Pleistocene/Holocene). Asoriculus is closely related and likely ancestral to the genus Nesiotites, known from the Balearic Islands from the Early Pliocene to the Holocene, whose species have sometimes been included in Asoriculus. The Asoriculus species A. corsicanus and A. similis were formerly included in Nesiotites in its original circumscription, though they are usually no longer treated as part of the genus.

Based on DNA from Nesiotites, the closest living relatives of Asoriculus are considered to be the terrestrial Soriculus shrews known from the Himalayas and adjacent areas, belonging to a clade of terrestrial nectogaline shrews primarily known from Asia, also including the genera Episoriculus and Chodsigoa, rather than related to the nectogaline water shrews (Chimarrogale, Nectogale and Neomys). A molecular clock analysis suggests that Himalayan shrews and Balearic shrews genetically diverged approximately 6.44 million years ago.

Phylogeny of Nectogalini based on DNA and morphological characters after Bover et al. (2018).

- Nectogalini
  - Episoriculus fumidus
  - - - - Chimarrogale himalayica (Himalayan water shrew)
        - Nectogale elegans (elegant water shrew)
      - Neomys
        - Neomys fodiens (water shrew)
        - †Neomys newtoni
    - - - Soriculus nigrescens (Himalayan shrew)
        - - †Nesiotites hidalgo (Balearic shrew)
          - †Asoriculus gibberodon
      - - Episoriculus
          - - Episoriculus leucops
            - Episoriculus caudatus
          - Episoriculus macrurus
        - Chodsigoa
          - - Chodsigoa parca
            - Chodsigoa sodalis
          - Chodsigoa hypsibia

The Sardinian-Coriscan species A. similis appears to have survived into the Holocene, when it became extinct sometime after human settlement of the islands, with remains apparently being found in Mesolithic and Neolithic aged archaeological sites in Sardinia. Studies in the 1990s suggested that Asoriculus became extinct on Corsica between 393 and 151 BC during the Carthaginian or Roman period.

== Description ==
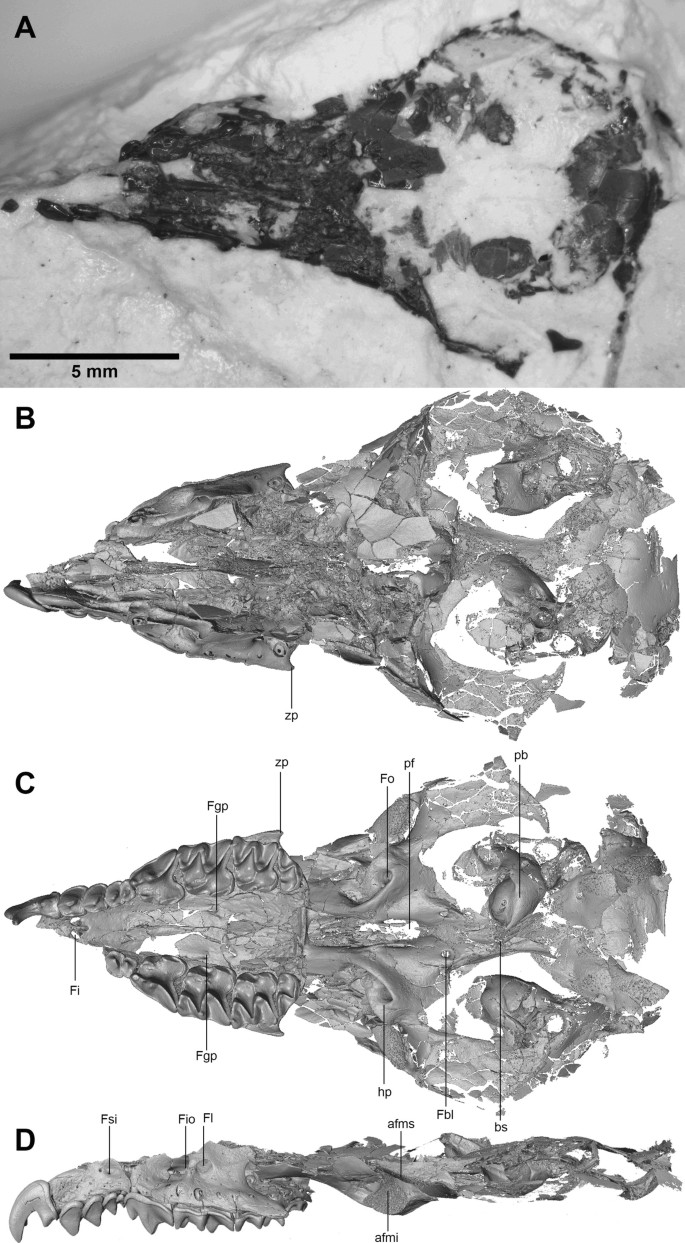
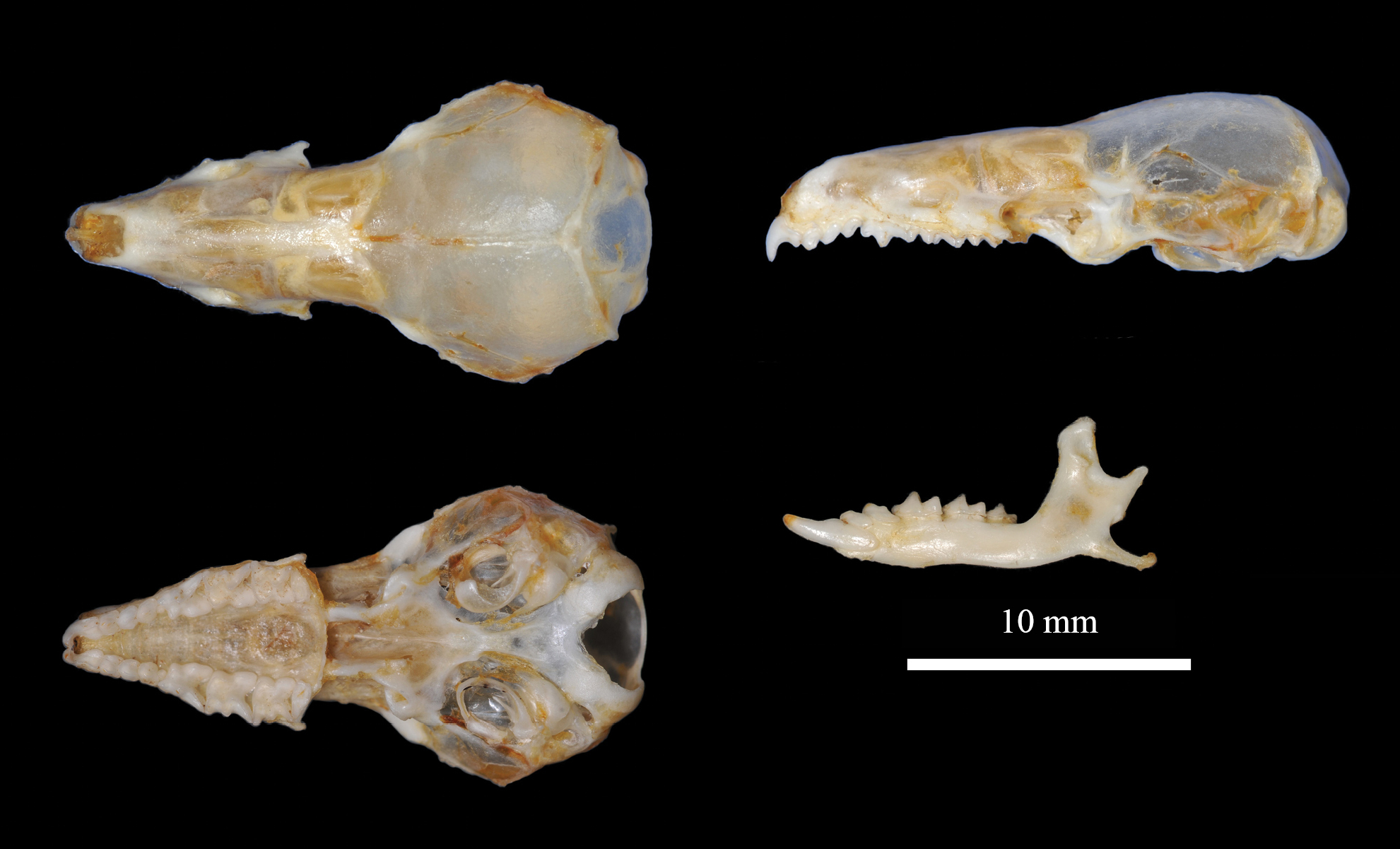
Photo and 3D scans of the crushed skull of A. gibberodon from Jradzor, Armenia (left) and skull of the closely related living Soriculus species S. beibengensis for comparison (right)

The skulls of fossil shews are generally only known from fragments of the maxilla and sometimes the nasal-palate region due to the thinness of the rest of the skull bones. A relatively well preserved but crushed skull, one of only a handful of well-preserved skulls known for fossil shrews, of Asoriculus gibberodon from the Pliocene of Jradzor, Armenia, is overall closest in morphology to those of its closest living relatives Soriculus and Episoriculus. The skull has four antemolars (the teeth situated between the incisor and the fourth premolar tooth) in each side of the upper jaw, as in the aforementioned genera. The skull of Asoriculus gibberodon differs from Soriculus and Episoriculus in having the lachrymal foramen (an opening of the skull) placed more forward (anteriorly) and higher up (dorsally) on the skull.

A. gibberodon has been estimated to weigh approximately 8.85 grams (0.312 oz). The insular species of Asoriculus are substantially larger than A. gibberodon and most other species of Nectogalini, with A. burgioi estimated to weigh 27.54 grams (0.971 oz) and A. similis 23.68 grams (0.835 oz), which has been cited as an example of island gigantism.

== Ecology ==
Although some authors have argued for an aquatic ecology based its previously assumed close relationship with Neomys water shrews, the fact that its closest relatives are terrestrial and that the inner ear morphology of the Jradzor skull is closer to those of terrestrial shrews than aquatic shrews suggests a terrestrial lifestyle for Asoriculus. Asoriculus gibberodon has been suggested to have had a preference for humid, vegetated environments near water, though some authors have suggested that it also inhabited arid environments. It is suggested to have used high-pitched clicks to echolocate in order to orientate itself when in dense vegetation, like living shrews. A terrestrial ecology for Asoriculus species is also supported by the proportions of their bones, which fall within the morphological range of living ground-dwelling terrestrial shrews.
