= List of mammals of Bhutan =

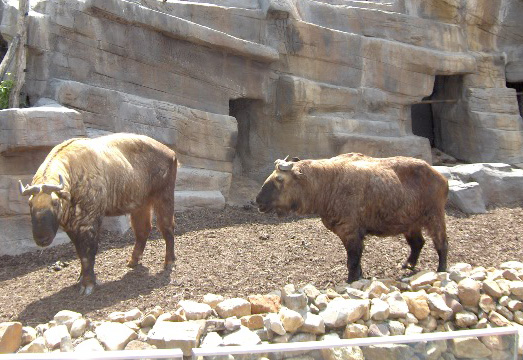
The Bhutan takin (Budorcas taxicolor whitei) is the national animal of Bhutan.

This is a list of the mammal species recorded in Bhutan. There are about 120 mammal species in Bhutan, of which one is critically endangered, ten are endangered, fourteen are vulnerable, and three are near threatened.

The following tags are used to highlight each species' conservation status as assessed by the International Union for Conservation of Nature:

EX	Extinct	No reasonable doubt that the last individual has died.
EW	Extinct in the wild	Known only to survive in captivity or as a naturalized populations well outside its previous range.
CR	Critically endangered	The species is in imminent risk of extinction in the wild.
EN	Endangered	The species is facing an extremely high risk of extinction in the wild.
VU	Vulnerable	The species is facing a high risk of extinction in the wild.
NT	Near threatened	The species does not meet any of the criteria that would categorise it as risking extinction but it is likely to do so in the future.
LC	Least concern	There are no current identifiable risks to the species.
DD	Data deficient	There is inadequate information to make an assessment of the risks to this species.

== Order: Artiodactyla (even-toed ungulates) ==
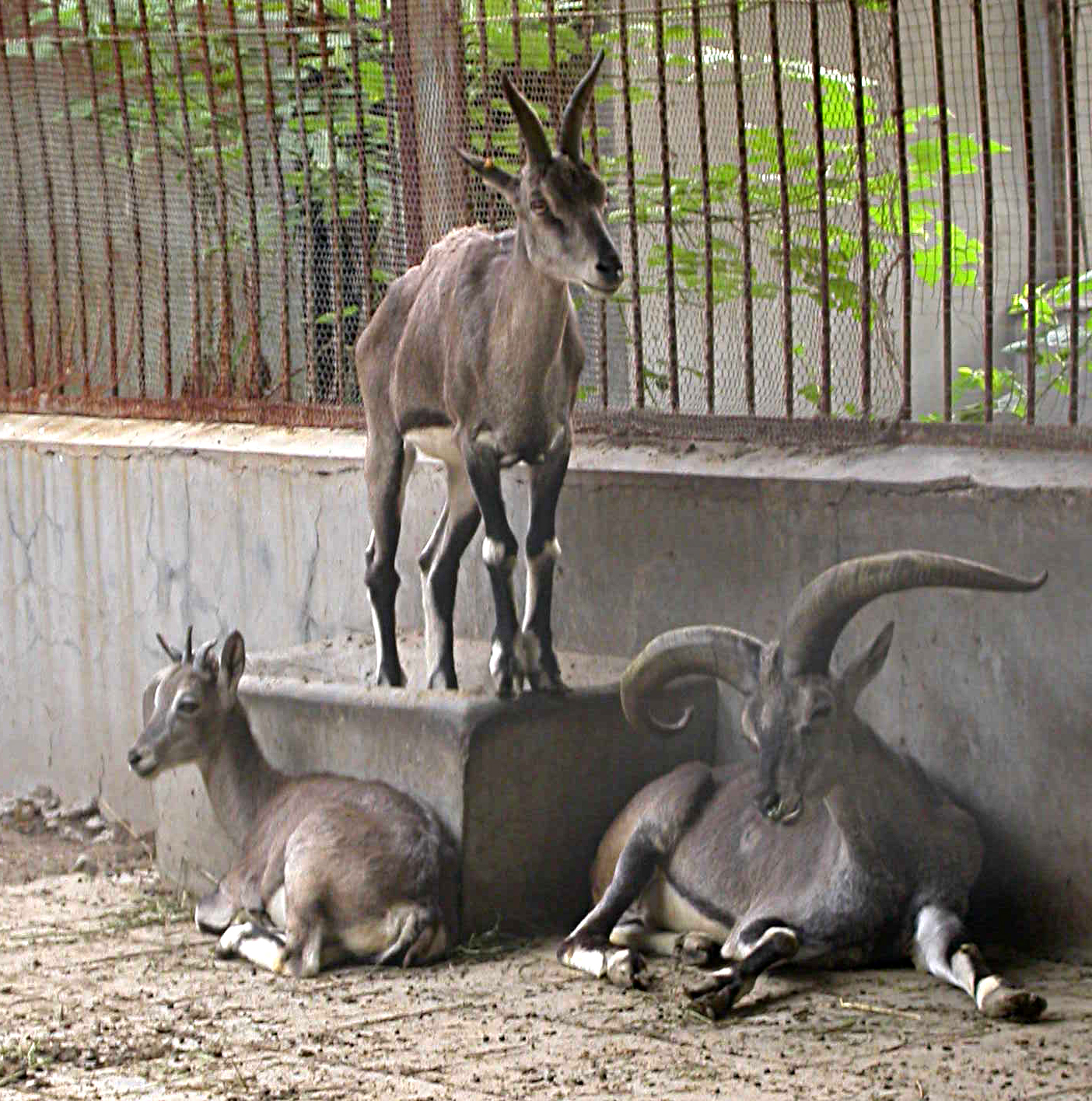
Bharal

The even-toed ungulates are ungulates whose weight is borne about equally by the third and fourth toes, rather than mostly or entirely by the third as in perissodactyls. There are about 220 artiodactyl species, including many that are of great economic importance to humans.

- Family: Bovidae (cattle, antelope, sheep, goats)
  - Subfamily: Bovinae
    - Genus: Bos
      - Gaur, B. gaurus VU
    - Genus: Bubalus
      - Wild water buffalo, B. arnee EN
  - Subfamily: Caprinae
    - Genus: Budorcas
      - Takin, B. taxicolor VU
        - Bhutan takin, B. t. whitei
    - Genus Capricornis
      - Mainland serow, C. sumatraensis VU
    - Genus: Hemitragus
      - Himalayan tahr, H. jemlahicus NT
    - Genus: Nemorhaedus
      - Himalayan goral, N. goral NT
    - Genus: Ovis
      - Argali, O. ammon NT presence uncertain
    - Genus: Pseudois
      - Bharal, P. nayaur LC
- Family: Moschidae
  - Genus: Moschus
    - Alpine musk deer, M. chrysogaster EN
    - Black musk deer, M. fuscus EN
- Family: Cervidae (deer)
  - Subfamily: Cervinae
    - Genus: Axis
      - Chital, A. axis LC
      - Indian hog deer, A. porcinus EN
    - Genus: Cervus
      - Wapiti, C. canadensis LC
    - Genus: Rucervus
      - Barasingha, R. duvaucelii VU
    - Genus Rusa
      - Sambar deer, R. unicolor VU
  - Subfamily: Muntiacinae
    - Genus: Muntiacus
      - Indian muntjac, M. muntjak LC
- Family: Suidae (pigs)
  - Subfamily: Suinae
    - Genus: Porcula
      - Pygmy hog, P. salvanius CR presence uncertain
    - Genus: Sus
      - Wild boar, S. scrofa LC

== Order: Carnivora (carnivorans) ==
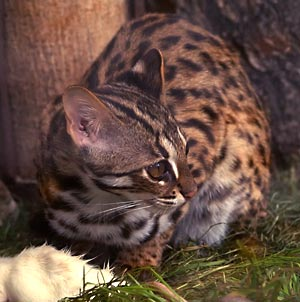
Leopard cat

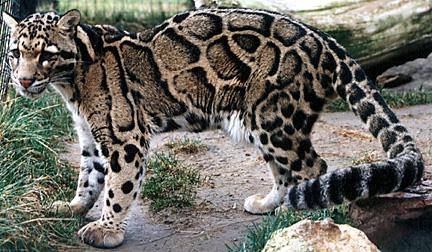
Clouded leopard

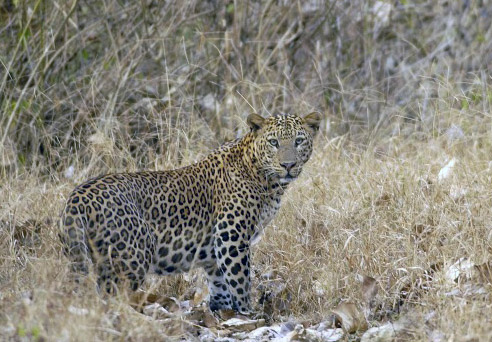
Indian leopard

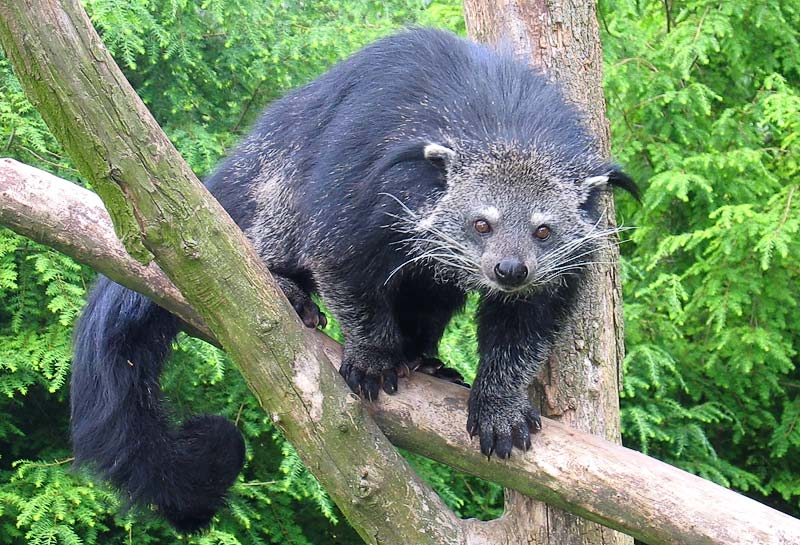
Binturong

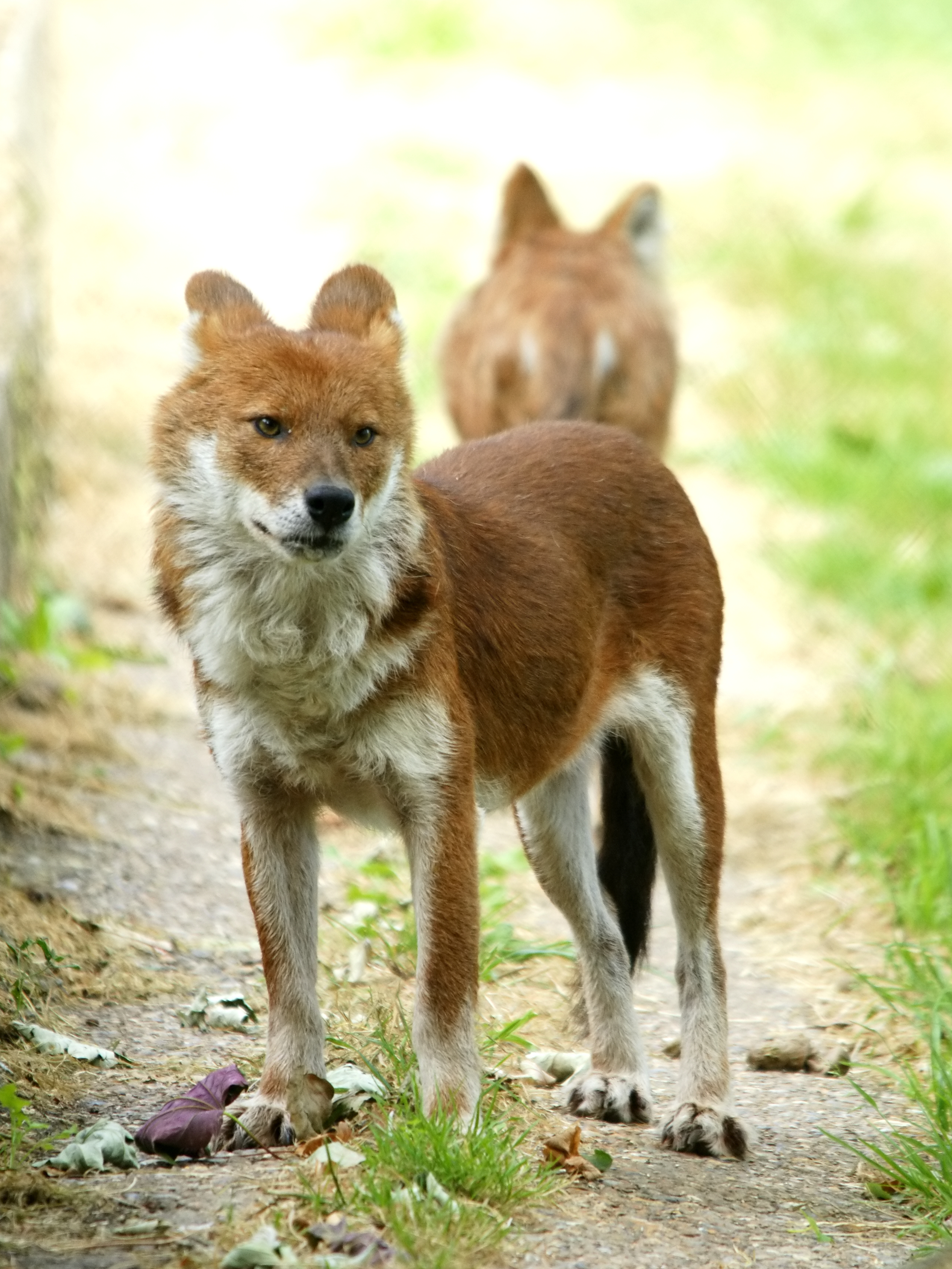
Dhole

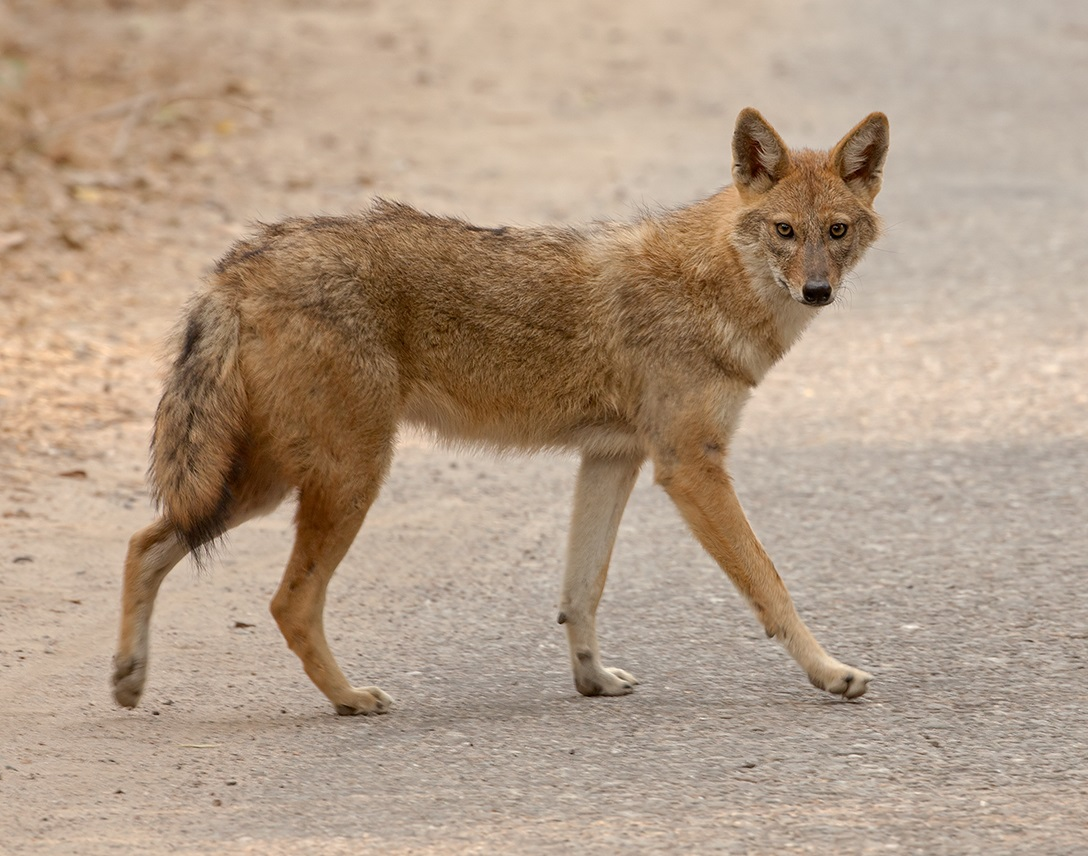
Indian jackal, a subspecies of the golden jackal

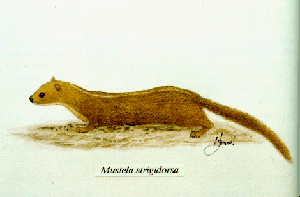
Back-striped weasel

There are over 260 species of carnivorans, the majority of which eat meat as their primary dietary item. They have a characteristic skull shape and dentition.

- Suborder: Feliformia
  - Family: Felidae (cats)
    - Subfamily: Felinae
      - Genus: Catopuma
        - Asian golden cat, C. temminckii NT
      - Genus: Felis
        - Jungle cat, F. chaus LC
      - Genus: Lynx
        - Eurasian lynx, L. lynx LC
      - Genus: Otocolobus
        - Pallas's cat, O. manul LC
      - Genus: Pardofelis
        - Marbled cat, P. marmorata NT
      - Genus: Prionailurus
        - Leopard cat, P. bengalensis LC
    - Subfamily: Pantherinae
      - Genus: Neofelis
        - Clouded leopard, N. nebulosa VU
      - Genus: Panthera
        - Leopard, P. pardus VU
          - Asiatic leopard
            - Indian leopard P. p. fusca
        - Tiger, P. tigris EN
          - Bengal tiger, P. t. tigris
        - Snow leopard, P. uncia VU
  - Family: Viverridae
    - Subfamily: Paradoxurinae
      - Genus: Arctictis
        - Binturong, A. binturong VU
      - Genus: Paguma
        - Masked palm civet, P. larvata LC
      - Genus: Paradoxurus
        - Asian palm civet, P. hermaphroditus LC
    - Subfamily: Prionodontinae
      - Genus: Prionodon
        - Spotted linsang, P. pardicolor LC
    - Subfamily: Viverrinae
      - Genus: Viverra
        - Large Indian civet, V. zibetha LC
      - Genus: Viverricula
        - Small Indian civet, V. indica LC
  - Family: Herpestidae (mongooses)
    - Genus: Urva
      - Indian grey mongoose, U. edwardsii LC
      - Small Indian mongoose, U. auropunctata LC
      - Crab-eating mongoose, U. urva LC
- Suborder: Caniformia
  - Family: Ailuridae (lesser panda)
    - Genus: Ailurus
      - Red panda, A. fulgens EN
  - Family: Canidae (dogs, foxes)
    - Genus: Canis
      - Golden jackal, C. aureus LC
        - Indian jackal, C. a. indicus
      - Gray wolf, C. lupus LC
        - Himalayan wolf, C. l. chanco
    - Genus: Cuon
      - Dhole, C. alpinus EN
    - Genus: Vulpes
      - Bengal fox, V. bengalensis LC
      - Red fox, V. vulpes LC
  - Family: Ursidae (bears)
    - Genus: Melursus
      - Sloth bear, M. ursinus VU
    - Genus: Ursus
      - Brown bear, U. arctos LC possibly extirpated
        - Himalayan brown bear, U. a. isabellinus CR possibly extirpated
      - Asiatic black bear, U. thibetanus VU
        - Himalayan black bear, U. t. laniger
  - Family: Mustelidae (mustelids)
    - Genus: Aonyx
      - Asian small-clawed otter, A. cinereus VU
    - Genus: Arctonyx
      - Northern hog badger, A. albogularis LC presence uncertain
    - Genus: Lutra
      - Eurasian otter, L. lutra NT
    - Genus: Lutrogale
      - Smooth-coated otter, L. perspicillata VU
    - Genus: Martes
      - Yellow-throated marten, M. flavigula LC
      - Beech marten, M. foina LC
    - Genus: Mustela
      - Mountain weasel, M. altaica NT
      - Yellow-bellied weasel, M. kathiah LC
      - Siberian weasel, M. sibirica LC
      - Back-striped weasel, M. strigidorsa LC

== Order: Cetacea (whales) ==
The order Cetacea includes whales, dolphins, and porpoises. They are the mammals most fully adapted to aquatic life with a spindle-shaped nearly hairless body, protected by a thick layer of blubber, and forelimbs and tail modified to provide propulsion underwater.

- Suborder: Odontoceti
  - Superfamily: Platanistoidea
    - Family: Platanistidae
      - Genus: Platanista
        - Ganges river dolphin, P. gangetica EN presence uncertain

== Order: Chiroptera (bats) ==
The bats' most distinguishing feature is that their forelimbs are developed as wings, making them the only mammals capable of flight. Bat species account for about 20% of all mammals.

- Family: Pteropodidae (flying foxes, Old World fruit bats)
  - Subfamily: Pteropodinae
    - Genus: Cynopterus
      - Greater short-nosed fruit bat, C. sphinx
    - Genus: Sphaerias
      - Blanford's fruit bat, S. blanfordi LC
    - Genus: Pteropus
      - Indian flying fox, P. giganteus LC
- Family: Vespertilionidae
  - Subfamily: Myotinae
    - Genus: Myotis
      - Lesser mouse-eared bat, M. blythii LC
      - Whiskered myotis, M. muricola
      - Himalayan whiskered bat, M. siligorensis
  - Subfamily: Vespertilioninae
    - Genus: Hesperoptenus
      - Tickell's bat, Hesperoptenus tickelli
    - Genus: Pipistrellus
      - Indian pipistrelle, Pipistrellus coromandra
    - Genus: Scotozous
      - Dormer's bat, S. dormeri LC
  - Subfamily: Murininae
    - Genus: Murina
      - Round-eared tube-nosed bat, Murina cyclotis
  - Subfamily: Miniopterinae
    - Genus: Miniopterus
      - Small bent-winged bat, Miniopterus pusillus
- Family: Molossidae
  - Genus: Chaerephon
    - Wrinkle-lipped free-tailed bat, Chaerephon plicata
- Family: Rhinolophidae
  - Subfamily: Rhinolophinae
    - Genus: Rhinolophus
      - Intermediate horseshoe bat, Rhinolophus affinis
      - Pearson's horseshoe bat, Rhinolophus pearsoni

== Order: Lagomorpha ==
The lagomorphs comprise two families, Leporidae (hares and rabbits), and Ochotonidae (pikas). Though they can resemble rodents, and were classified as a superfamily in that order until the early 20th century; they have since been considered a separate order. They differ from rodents in a number of physical characteristics, such as having four incisors in the upper jaw rather than two.

- Family: Leporidae (hares and rabbits)
  - Genus: Caprolagus
    - Hispid hare, C. hispidus EN
  - Genus: Lepus
    - Indian hare, L. nigricollis LC presence uncertain
    - Woolly hare, L. oiostolus LC
- Family: Ochotonidae (pikas)
  - Genus: Ochotona
    - Plateau pika, O. curzoniae LC
    - Forrest's pika, O. forresti LC
    - Glover's pika, O. gloveri LC
    - Large-eared pika, O. macrotis LC
    - Nubra pika, O. nubrica LC
    - Royle's pika, O. roylei LC
    - Moupin pika, O. thibetana LC

== Order: Pholidota (pangolins) ==
Scaly anteaters, or pangolins, are armored with large, overlapping scales made of matted hair. There are approximately seven species of pangolin, of which two occur in Bhutan. Pangolins lack teeth, and eat only ants and termites with the assistance of a long sticky tongue.

- Family: Manidae (pangolins)
  - Genus: Manis
    - Indian pangolin, M. crassicaudata EN
    - Chinese pangolin, M. pentadactyla CR

== Order: Perissodactyla (odd-toed ungulates) ==
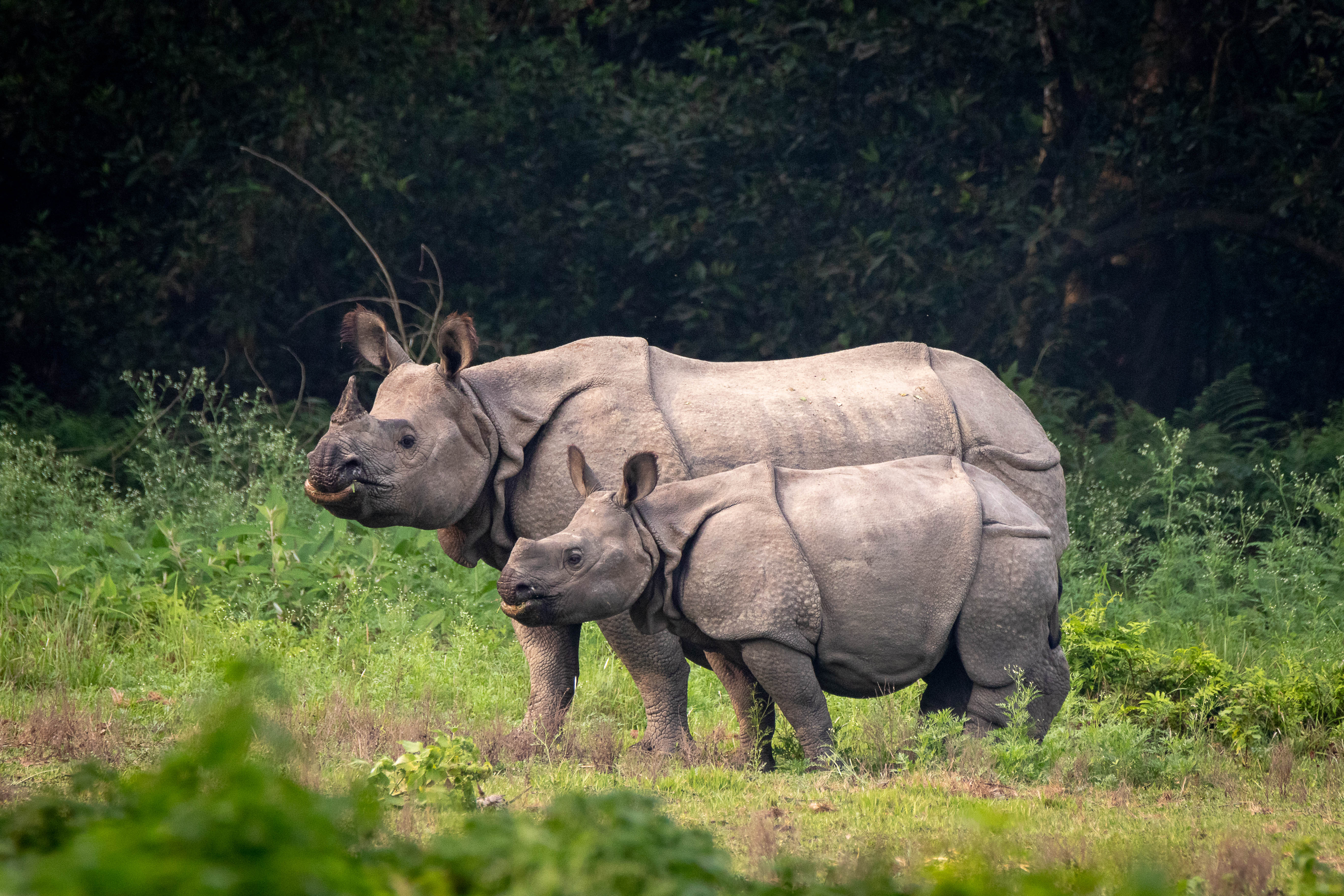
Indian rhinoceros

The odd-toed ungulates are browsing and grazing mammals. They are usually large to very large, and have relatively simple stomachs and a large middle toe.

- Family: Rhinocerotidae
  - Genus: Rhinoceros
    - Indian rhinoceros, R. unicornis VU

== Order: Primates ==
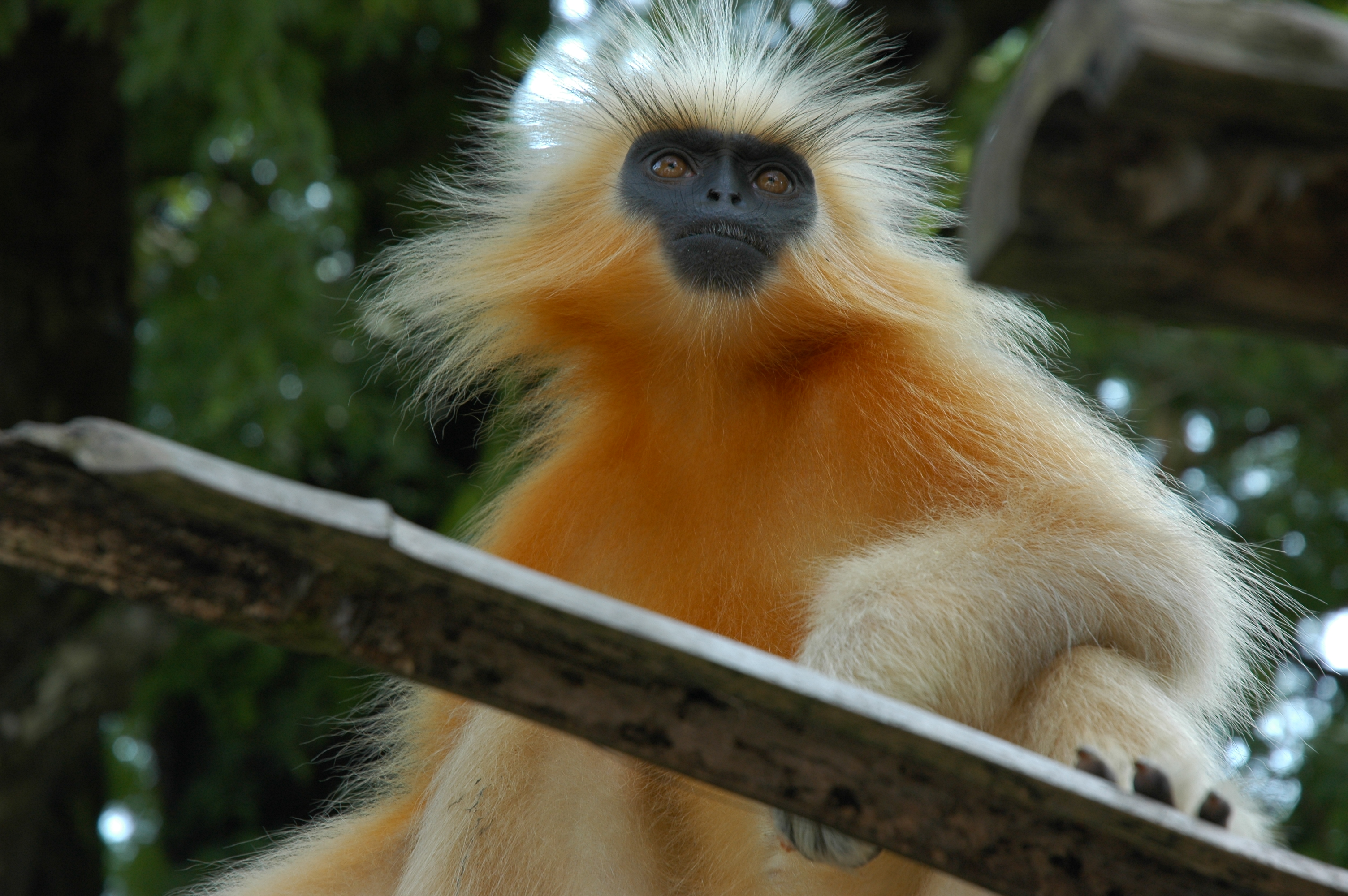
Gee's golden langur or Raksha (in Khengkha)

The order Primates contains humans and their closest relatives: lemurs, lorisoids, monkeys, and apes.

- Suborder: Strepsirrhini
  - Infraorder: Lemuriformes
    - Superfamily: Lorisoidea
      - Family: Loridae
        - Genus: Nycticebus
          - Bengal slow loris, N. bengalensis EN
- Suborder: Haplorhini
  - Infraorder: Simiiformes
    - Parvorder: Catarrhini
      - Superfamily: Cercopithecoidea
        - Family: Cercopithecidae (Old World monkeys)
          - Genus: Macaca
            - Assam macaque, M. assamensis NT
            - Rhesus macaque, M. mulatta LC
          - Subfamily: Colobinae
            - Genus: Semnopithecus
              - Nepal gray langur, S. schistaceus LC
            - Genus: Trachypithecus
              - Gee's golden langur, T. geei EN
              - Capped langur, T. pileatus EN

== Order: Proboscidea (elephants) ==
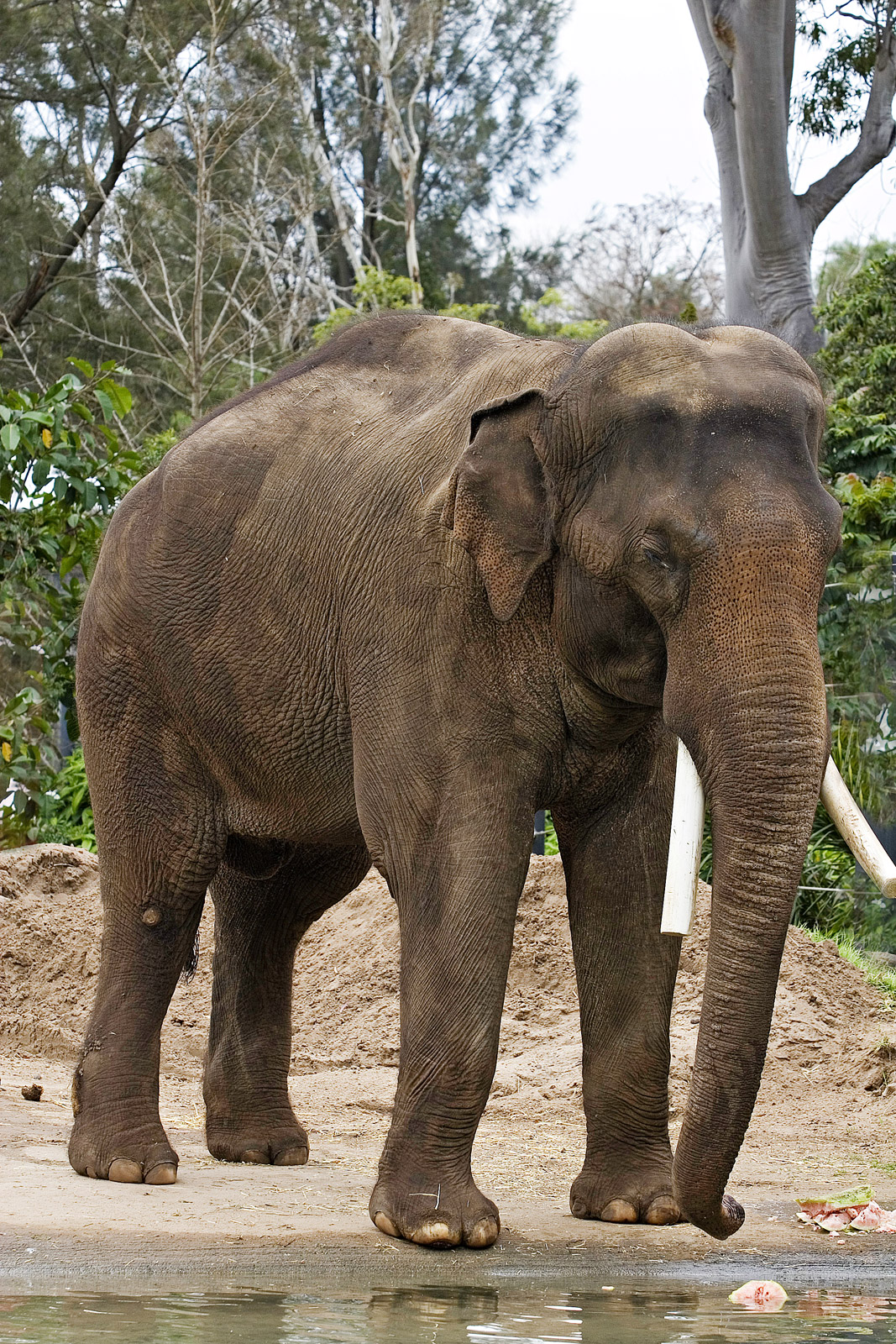
Asian elephant

The elephants comprise three living species and are the largest living land animals.

- Family: Elephantidae (elephants)
  - Genus: Elephas
    - Asian elephant, E. maximus EN

== Order: Rodentia (rodents) ==
Rodents make up the largest order of mammals, with over 40% of mammalian species. They have two incisors in the upper and lower jaw which grow continually and must be kept short by gnawing. Most rodents are small though the capybara can weigh up to 45 kg (99 lb).

- Suborder: Sciurognathi
  - Family: Sciuridae (squirrels)
    - Subfamily: Ratufinae
      - Genus: Ratufa
        - Black giant squirrel, Ratufa bicolor
    - Subfamily: Sciurinae
      - Tribe: Pteromyini
        - Genus: Belomys
          - Hairy-footed flying squirrel, Belomys pearsonii
        - Genus: Hylopetes
          - Particolored flying squirrel, Hylopetes alboniger EN
        - Genus: Petaurista
          - Bhutan giant flying squirrel, Petaurista nobilis
    - Subfamily: Callosciurinae
      - Genus: Callosciurus
        - Irrawaddy squirrel, Callosciurus pygerythrus LC
      - Genus: Tamiops
        - Himalayan striped squirrel, Tamiops macclellandi
  - Family: Spalacidae
    - Subfamily: Rhizomyinae
      - Genus: Cannomys
        - Lesser bamboo rat, Cannomys badius
  - Family: Cricetidae
    - Subfamily: Arvicolinae
      - Genus: Microtus
        - Sikkim mountain vole, Microtus sikimensis
  - Family: Muridae (mice, rats, voles, gerbils, hamsters)
    - Subfamily: Murinae
      - Genus: Mus
        - Gairdner's shrewmouse, Mus pahari LC
        - Earth-colored mouse, M. terricolor LC
      - Genus: Rattus
        - Himalayan field rat, Rattus nitidus
        - Sikkim rat, Rattus sikkimensis VU

== Order: Soricomorpha (shrews, moles, and solenodons) ==
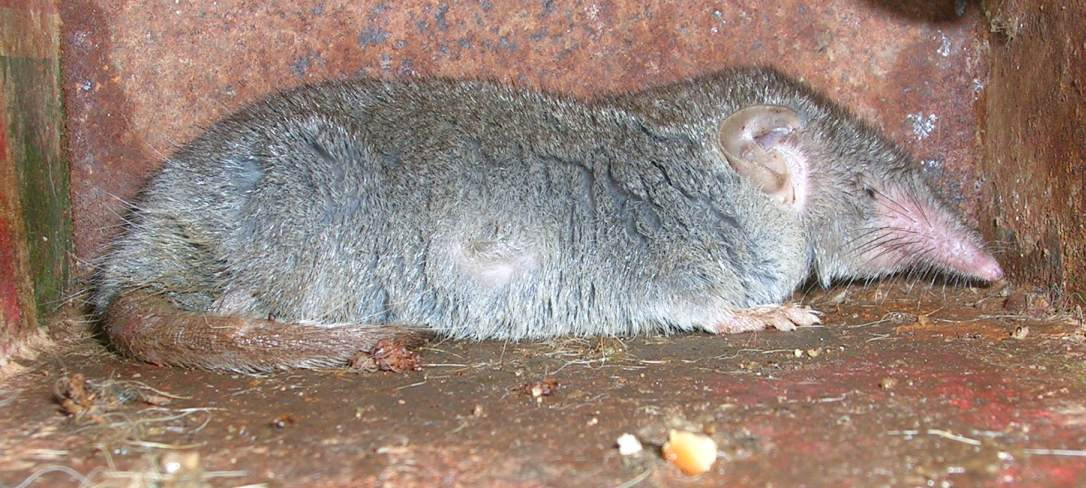
Asian house shrew

The "shrew-forms" are insectivorous mammals. The shrews and solenodons closely resemble mice while the moles are stout-bodied burrowers.

- Family: Soricidae (shrews)
  - Subfamily: Crocidurinae
    - Genus: Crocidura
      - Grey shrew, Crocidura attenuata
      - Southeast Asian shrew, Crocidura fuliginosa
      - Horsfield's shrew, Crocidura horsfieldi
    - Genus: Suncus
      - Etruscan shrew, S. etruscus LC
      - Asian house shrew, S. murinus LC
  - Subfamily: Soricinae
    - Tribe: Anourosoricini
      - Genus: Anourosorex
        - Mole shrew, Anourosorex squamipes
    - Tribe: Nectogalini
      - Genus: Chimarrogale
        - Himalayan water shrew, Chimarrogale himalayica
      - Genus: Nectogale
        - Elegant water shrew, Nectogale elegans
      - Genus: Sorex
        - Eurasian pygmy shrew, S. minutus LC
      - Genus: Soriculus
        - Bailey's shrew, Soriculus baileyi
        - Hodgson's brown-toothed shrew, Soriculus caudatus
        - Long-tailed brown-toothed shrew, Soriculus leucops
        - Long-tailed mountain shrew, Soriculus macrurus
        - Himalayan shrew, Soriculus nigrescens
- Family: Talpidae (moles)
  - Subfamily: Talpinae
    - Tribe: Talpini
      - Genus: Euroscaptor
        - Himalayan mole, Euroscaptor micrura

== Locally extinct ==
The following species are locally extinct in the country:

- Wild yak, Bos mutus

== See also ==
- List of chordate orders
- List of prehistoric mammals
- Lists of mammals by region
- Mammal classification
- Mammals discovered in the 2000s
