= Episoriculus =

Scientific classification
- Kingdom: Animalia
- Phylum: Chordata
- Class: Mammalia
- Order: Eulipotyphla
- Family: Soricidae
- Tribe: Nectogalini
- Genus: Episoriculus; Ellerman & Morrison-Scott, 1966

Type species
- Sorex caudatus

Species
- See text

Genus of mammals

Episoriculus is a genus of shrew in the red-toothed shrew subfamily. Its common name is brown-toothed shrew. It has been described as a subgenus to Soriculus in the past. The genus occurs at a number of locations in Asia, including Nepal and China.

== Species ==
Currently, the four identified species of the genus Episoriculus include:

- Hodgson's brown-toothed shrew (E. caudatus)
  - E. c. sacratus
  - E. c. umbrinus
- Taiwanese brown-toothed shrew (E. fumidus)
- Long-tailed brown-toothed shrew (E. leucops)
  - E. l. leucops
  - E. l. baileyi
- Long-tailed mountain shrew (E. macrurus)

The monophyly of the genus has been questioned, as E. fumidus has been found to be only distantly related to other species in the genus.

Phylogeny of Nectogalini based on DNA and morphological characters after Bover et al. (2018).

- Nectogalini
  - Episoriculus fumidus
  - - - - Chimarrogale himalayica (Himalayan water shrew)
        - Nectogale elegans (elegant water shrew)
      - Neomys
        - Neomys fodiens (water shrew)
        - †Neomys newtoni
    - - - Soriculus nigrescens (Himalayan shrew)
        - - †Nesiotites hidalgo
          - †Asoriculus gibberodon
      - - Episoriculus
          - - Episoriculus leucops
            - Episoriculus caudatus
          - Episoriculus macrurus
        - Chodsigoa
          - - Chodsigoa parca
            - Chodsigoa sodalis
          - Chodsigoa hypsibia
