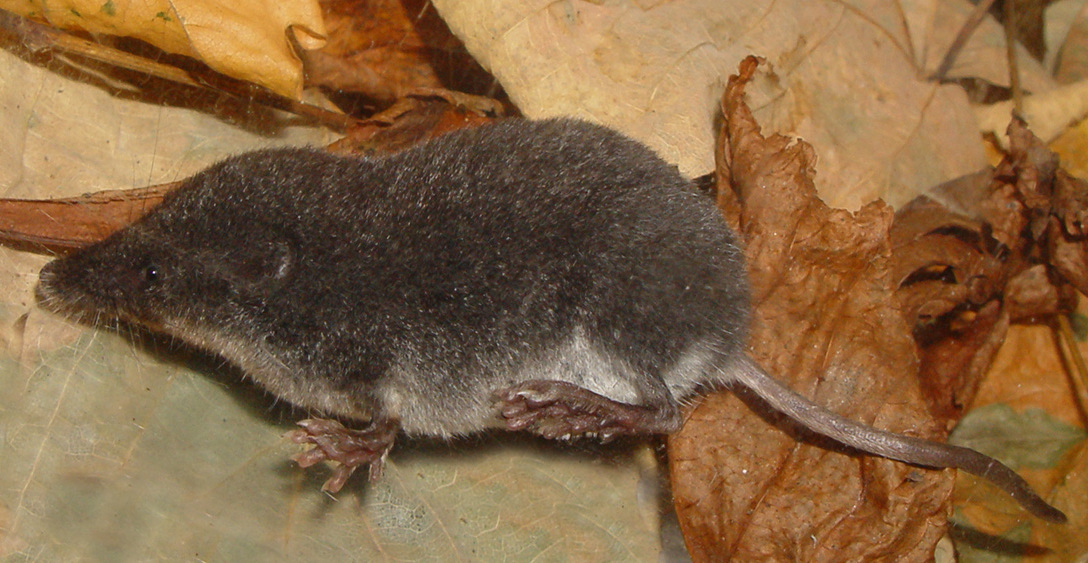
- Southern water shrew (Neomys anomalus)

Scientific classification
- Domain: Eukaryota
- Kingdom: Animalia
- Phylum: Chordata
- Class: Mammalia
- Order: Eulipotyphla
- Family: Soricidae
- Subfamily: Soricinae
- Tribe: Nectogalini; Andersson, 1879

Genera
- Chimarrogale; Chodsigoa; Episoriculus; Nectogale; Neomys; Soriculus; †Asoriculus; †Nesiotites

= Nectogalini =

Tribe of shrews

Nectogalini is a tribe of Old World shrews within the family Soricidae. As of late 2007, it consisted of six extant genera and 25 species, with some of the latter being further divided into subspecies. Some, but not all members of the tribe are semiaquatic.

== Adaptation to semiaquatic life ==
Members of this tribe that are associated with a semiaquatic mode of life (Chimarrogale, Nectogale, and Neomys) have developed several lifestyle adaptations. For example, some species have stiff hairs on the sides of their toes and feet, both on their fore and hind limbs. These increase the surface area of the feet, assisting in locomotion during swimming. In addition, species such as Neomys fodiens have developed elongated tails with the hairs forming a keel-like shape that is similar in function to a rudder when the animal is in the water.

== Genera ==
- Chimarrogale (6 species)
- Chodsigoa (10 species)
- Episoriculus (4 species)
- Nectogale (monotypic)
- Neomys (3 species)
- Soriculus (monotypic)
- †Asoriculus (6 species extinct: Holocene)
- †Nesiotites (4 species extinct: Holocene)

Phylogeny of Nectogalini based on DNA and morphological characters after Bover et al. (2018).

- Nectogalini
  - Episoriculus fumidus
  - - - - Chimarrogale himalayica (Himalayan water shrew)
        - Nectogale elegans (elegant water shrew)
      - Neomys
        - Neomys fodiens (water shrew)
        - †Neomys newtoni
    - - - Soriculus nigrescens (Himalayan shrew)
        - - †Nesiotites hidalgo
          - †Asoriculus gibberodon
      - - Episoriculus
          - - Episoriculus leucops
            - Episoriculus caudatus
          - Episoriculus macrurus
        - Chodsigoa
          - - Chodsigoa parca
            - Chodsigoa sodalis
          - Chodsigoa hypsibia
