= Unicuspid =

Tooth with a single cusp

A unicuspid is a tooth that has only one cusp.

== In shrews ==
The dental formulas of shrews are distinguished by the number of unicuspids. All shrews have (in one half of each jaw) one large incisor followed by a variable number of unicuspids, followed by a complex premolar, followed by three molars. All shrews except for those of the genus Myosorex have one lower unicuspid; Myosorex has two. The genera Blarina, Blarinella, and Sorex have five upper unicuspids. The genera Myosorex, Feroculus, Scutisorex, Suncus, Sylvisorex, Ruwenzorisorex, Cryptotis, Neomys, Soriculus, and Episoriculus have four upper unicuspids. The genera Congosorex, Surdisorex, Solisorex, Paracrocidura, Crocidura, Chimarrogale, Chodsigoa, Megasorex, Nectogale, and Notiosorex have three upper unicuspids. The genera Diplomesodon and Anourosorex have two upper unicuspids.
