= Blarinellini =

Scientific classification
- Domain: Eukaryota
- Kingdom: Animalia
- Phylum: Chordata
- Class: Mammalia
- Order: Eulipotyphla
- Family: Soricidae
- Subfamily: Soricinae
- Tribe: Blarinellini; Reumer, 1998

Genera
- Blarinella; Parablarinella

Tribe of shrews

Blarinellini is a tribe of mammals. Recent Cytochrome b analysis led to the genus Blarinella (the tribe's type genus) being split, with Blarinella quadraticauda and B. wardi remaining while B. griselda is moved to Parablarinella as Parablarinella griselda alongside the new species P. latimaxillata.
