= Vị Xuyên district =

Coordinates: 22.750°N 104.833°E

Vị Xuyên district Huyện Vị Xuyên
- District
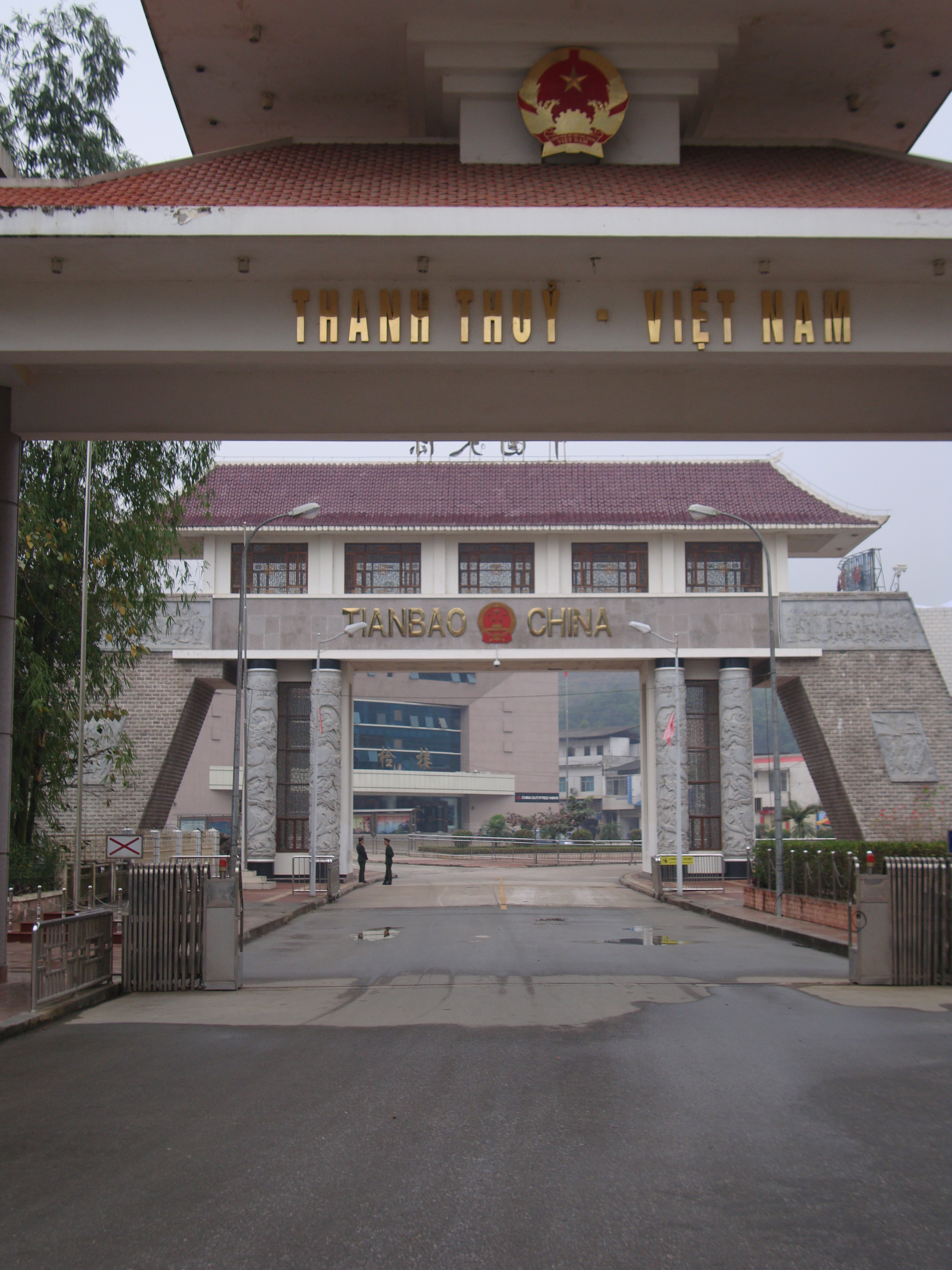
- Checkpoints between Thanh Thủy International Border Gate (Hà Giang, Vietnam) and Tienbao International Border Gate (Yunnan, China)
- Interactive map of Vị Xuyên district
- Country: Vietnam
- Region: Northeast
- Province: Hà Giang
- Capital: Vị Xuyên

Area
  - Total: 561 sq mi (1,452 km^{2})

Population (2019)
  - Total: 110,465
- Time zone: UTC+7 (Indochina Time)

Vị Xuyên is a former rural district of Hà Giang province in the Northeast region of Vietnam. As of 2019 the district had a population of 110,465. The district covers an area of 1,452 km^{2}. The district capital lies at Vị Xuyên.

A border crossing between Vietnam and China is located in the district at Thanh Thủy. The port of entry on the Chinese side of the border is Tianbao in Malipo county.

== History ==
Until the Nguyễn dynasty saw the growth of Hà Giang, Vị Xuyên was the largest settlement in the area. Battle of Laoshan is considered more fierce than the Chinese invasion into Vietnam in 1979. This battle lasted approximately four years - from late 1984 to 1989. China PLA was trying to take over Ha Giang's capital - Vi Xuyen, aiming to push into Vietnam's territory by 5 km. But, Vietnamese forces consisting of 9 divisions contained this ambition. The chains of attacks colloquially known as the Battle of Laoshan saw both sides suffering casualties in the thousands. Until now, many missing in action Vietnamese soldiers, both regulars and irregulars have yet to be recorded. Estimates state as many as 3,000 deceased Vietnamese soldiers have yet to be accounted for.

== Administrative divisions ==
Vị Xuyên District consists of two townships, Vị Xuyên (also the district capital) and Việt Lâm, and 24 communes: Bạch Ngọc, Cao Bồ, Đạo Đức, Kim Linh, Kim Thạch, Lao Chải, Linh Hồ, Minh Tân, Ngọc Linh, Ngọc Minh, Phong Quang, Phú Linh, Phương Tiến, Quảng Ngần, Thanh Đức, Thanh Thủy, Thuận Hòa, Thượng Sơn, Trung Thành, Tùng Bá, Việt Lâm and Xín Chải.

== Fauna ==
Small mammals found on Tây Côn Lĩnh II include Cynopterus sphinx, Rousettus leschenaulti, Sphaerias blanfordi, Scaptonyx fusicaudus, Chodsigoa parca, Chodsigoa caovansunga, Blarinella griselda, Crocidura attenuata, Crocidura fuliginosa, Crocidura wuchihensis, Belomys pearsonii, Callosciurus inornatus, Leopoldamys edwardsi, Niviventer fulvescens, Niviventer langbianis, Niviventer tenaster, Chiropodomys gliroides, Ratufa bicolor, and Tamiops sp.
