= Parablarinella =

Scientific classification
- Kingdom: Animalia
- Phylum: Chordata
- Class: Mammalia
- Order: Eulipotyphla
- Family: Soricidae
- Tribe: Blarinellini
- Genus: Parablarinella; Blannikova et al., 2019

Species
- Parablarinella griselda; Parablarinella latimaxillata

Genus of mammals

Parablarinella is a small genus of shrews in the subfamily Soricinae of the family Soricidae that was split off from Blarinella due to recent Cytochrome b analysis.
