= Pygmy brown-toothed shrew =

Conservation status
- Data Deficient (IUCN 3.1)

Scientific classification
- Kingdom: Animalia
- Phylum: Chordata
- Class: Mammalia
- Order: Eulipotyphla
- Family: Soricidae
- Genus: Chodsigoa
- Species: C. parva

Binomial name
- Chodsigoa parva G.M. Allen, 1923
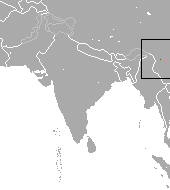
- Pygmy brown-toothed shrew range

Synonyms
- Soriculus parva (G.M. Allen, 1923)

Species of mammal

The pygmy brown-toothed shrew (Chodsigoa parva) is a species of shrew in the order Eulipotyphla. It is distributed in China. C. parva was initially thought to be the same as Chodsigoa lamula, but it was found to be a separate species.
