= Salenski's shrew =

Conservation status
- Data Deficient (IUCN 3.1)

Scientific classification
- Kingdom: Animalia
- Phylum: Chordata
- Class: Mammalia
- Order: Eulipotyphla
- Family: Soricidae
- Genus: Chodsigoa
- Species: C. salenskii

Binomial name
- Chodsigoa salenskii (Kastschenko, 1907)
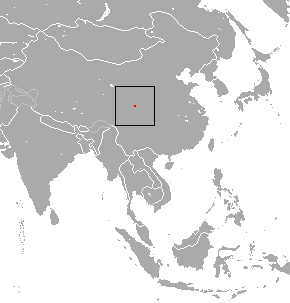
- Salenski's shrew range

Species of mammal

Salenski's shrew (Chodsigoa salenskii) is a red-toothed shrew found only in northern Sichuan, China, where it is known from Wolong National Nature Reserve.
