= Lamulate shrew =

Conservation status
- Least Concern (IUCN 3.1)

Scientific classification
- Kingdom: Animalia
- Phylum: Chordata
- Class: Mammalia
- Order: Eulipotyphla
- Family: Soricidae
- Genus: Chodsigoa
- Species: C. lamula

Binomial name
- Chodsigoa lamula (Thomas, 1912)
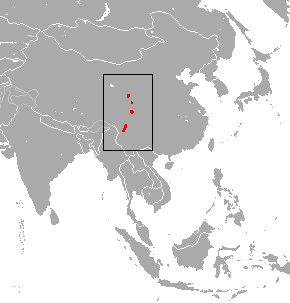
- Lamulate shrew range

Species of mammal

The lamulate shrew (Chodsigoa lamula) is a species of mammal in the family Soricidae. It is endemic to China.

== Taxonomy ==
Chodsigoa lamula was first described by Oldfield Thomas in 1912, based on a specimen collected the year before by G. Fenwick Owen. The type locality was "40 miles south-east of Tao-chou" in Gansu, China, at an altitude of 9,500 feet (2,900 m). Later analysis by Allen (1938) considered it a subspecies of Chodsigoa hypsibia. It remained that way until Hoffman (1985) reclassified it yet again as a full species based on its smaller size and overlapping distribution with C. hypsibia. In the same work, he reanalyzed C. parva as a subspecies of C. lamula, though some later authors disagreed with this. A 2017 genetic analysis, which looked at one specimen of C. lamula, found that C. lamula was genetically similar to C. hypsibia, and concluded that they may be the same species.

== Description ==
The lamulate shrew is very similar to Chodsigoa hypsibia, but is distinguished by its smaller size and flatter cranium. The fur is short and soft, with the back hairs about 3.5 millimetres (0.14 in) in length. It is mouse-grey and slightly paler on the bottom than top, with white hands and feed. The tail is greyish above and glossy whiteish below.

The type specimen measured 67 millimetres (2.6 in) in head and body length, with a 54 millimetres (2.1 in) tail and 13 millimetres (0.51 in) hind feet. The tail is shorter than other species in the genus.

== Distribution, ecology, and conservation status ==
The lamulate shrew is found in central southern China and inhabits high elevation montane forests, at approximately 3,000 metres (9,800 ft). A 2023 field survey in the forests of Mt. Liangshan, Sinchuan Province, recorded lamulate shrews only in secondary forests.

It is listed as a species of Least Concern by the IUCN due to its presumed wide range and large population, though little is known for certain about the population and distribution.
