= Large false serotine =

Conservation status
- Vulnerable (IUCN 3.1)

Scientific classification
- Kingdom: Animalia
- Phylum: Chordata
- Class: Mammalia
- Order: Chiroptera
- Family: Vespertilionidae
- Genus: Hesperoptenus
- Species: H. tomesi

Binomial name
- Hesperoptenus tomesi Thomas, 1905
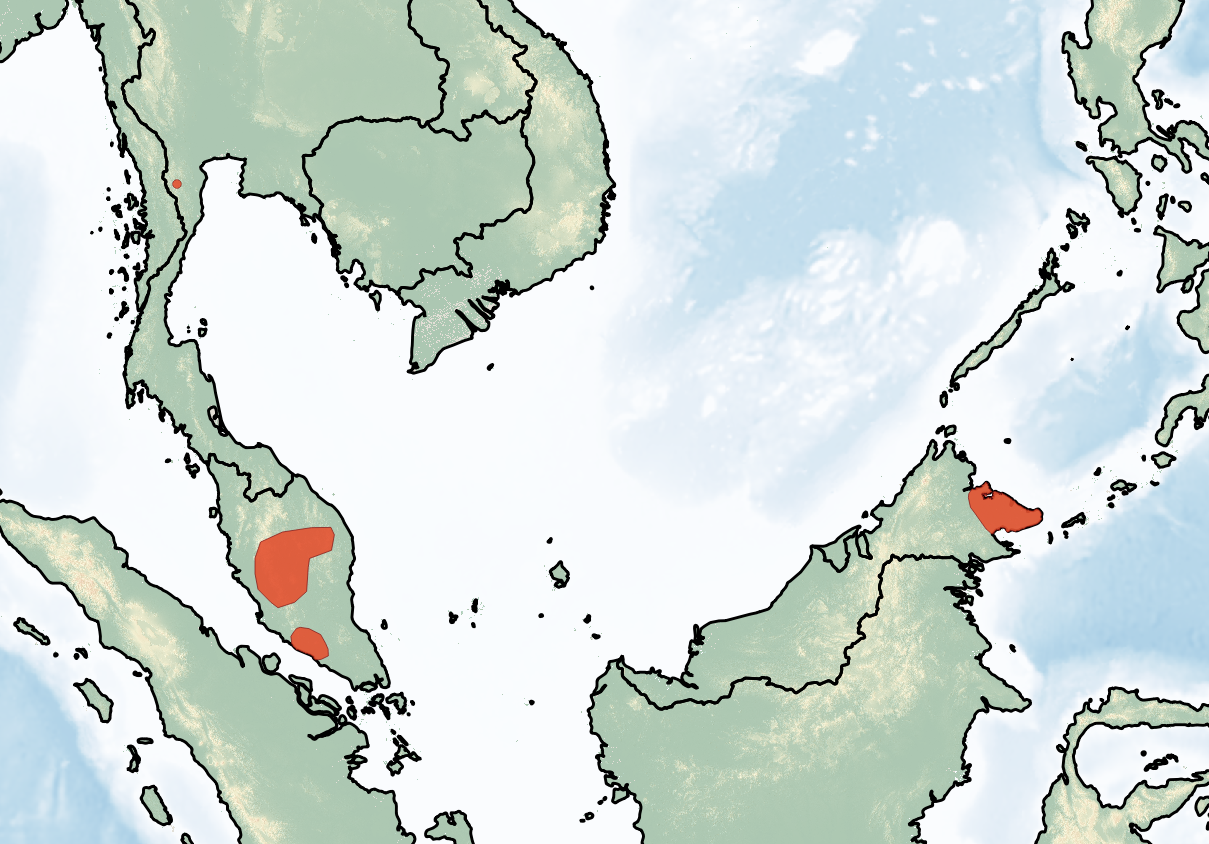

Species of bat

The large false serotine (Hesperoptenus tomesi) is a species of vesper bat. It is found only in Malaysia.
