= Smith's shrew =

Conservation status
- Near Threatened (IUCN 3.1)

Scientific classification
- Kingdom: Animalia
- Phylum: Chordata
- Class: Mammalia
- Order: Eulipotyphla
- Family: Soricidae
- Genus: Chodsigoa
- Species: C. smithii

Binomial name
- Chodsigoa smithii (Thomas, 1911)
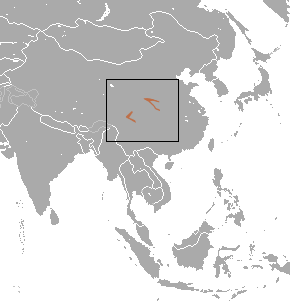
- Smith's shrew range

Species of mammal

The Smith's shrew (Chodsigoa smithii) is a species of mammal in the family Soricidae. It is endemic to southwest China, living primarily in mountainous broad-leaved forests at elevations of 900–3000 meters.
