= Van Sung's shrew =

Scientific classification
- Kingdom: Animalia
- Phylum: Chordata
- Class: Mammalia
- Order: Eulipotyphla
- Family: Soricidae
- Genus: Chodsigoa
- Species: C. caovansunga

Binomial name
- Chodsigoa caovansunga (Lunde, Musser and Son, 2003)
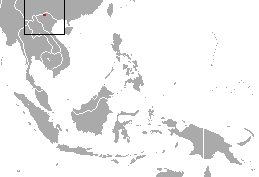
- Van Sung's shrew range

Synonyms
- Soriculus caovansunga (Lunde, Musser & Son, 2003)

Species of mammal

Van Sung's shrew (Chodsigoa caovansunga), also known as Cao Van Sung mountain shrew is a species of shrew in the Soricomorpha order. Specimens of Chodsigoa caovansunga have been found in Vietnam.

Chodsigoa caovansunga was named after Cao Van Sung, a small-mammal specialist at the Institute of Ecology and Biological Resources in Hanoi. The type locality is situated at 1,500 m (4,900 ft) altitude (22° 45'27 "N 104° 49'49" W) on Mount Tay Con Linh II in the town of Cao Bo, district Vi Xuyen, in the province of Ha Giang. C. caovansunga a small species with a relatively short tail without brush of long hair on its end. The hands and feet are brownish in color.
