= Gaskell's false serotine =

Conservation status
- Data Deficient (IUCN 3.1)

Scientific classification
- Kingdom: Animalia
- Phylum: Chordata
- Class: Mammalia
- Order: Chiroptera
- Family: Vespertilionidae
- Genus: Hesperoptenus
- Species: H. gaskelli

Binomial name
- Hesperoptenus gaskelli Hill, 1983
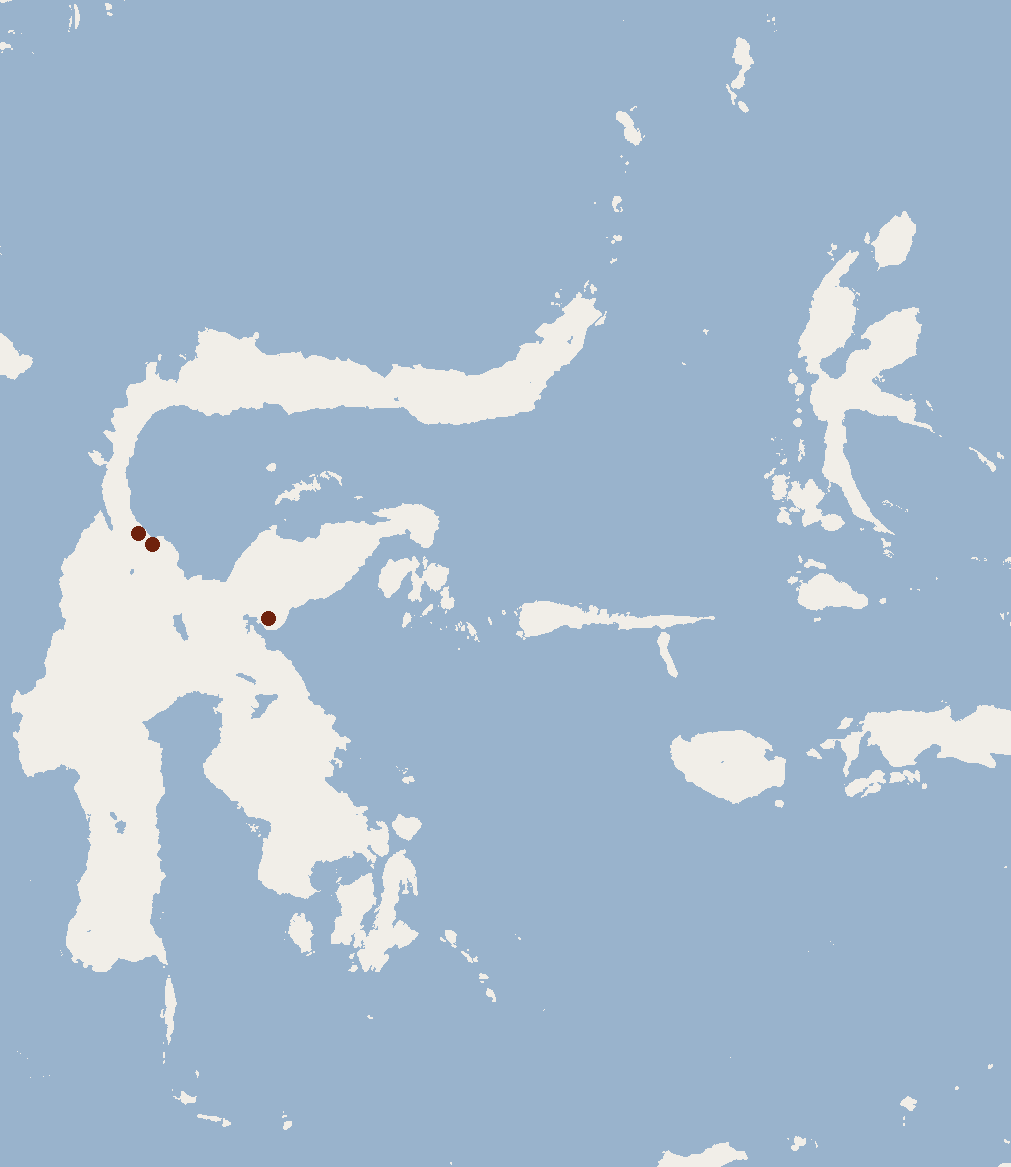

Species of bat

Gaskell's false serotine (Hesperoptenus gaskelli) is a species of vesper bat. It is found only in Indonesia.
