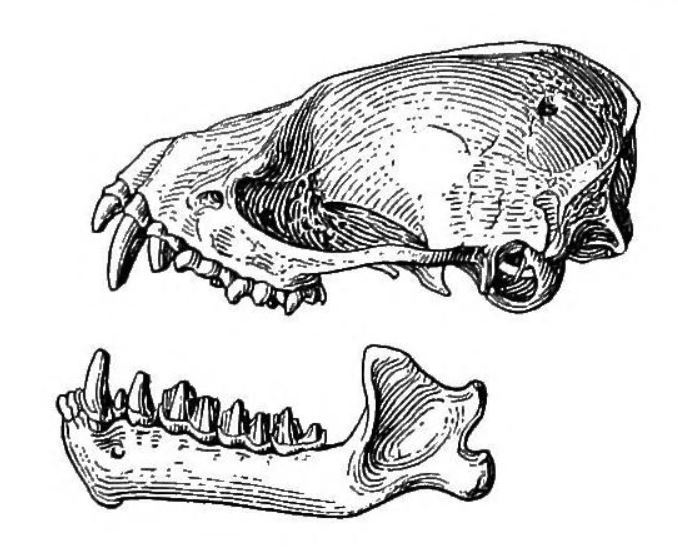

Scientific classification
- Domain: Eukaryota
- Kingdom: Animalia
- Phylum: Chordata
- Class: Mammalia
- Order: Chiroptera
- Family: Vespertilionidae
- Tribe: Eptesicini
- Genus: Hesperoptenus; Peters, 1868

Type species
- Vesperus (Hesperoptenus) doriae Peters, 1868

= Hesperoptenus =

Genus of bats

Hesperoptenus is a genus of bats within the Vespertilionidae or vesper bat family.

The species within this genus are:

- Blanford's bat (Hesperoptenus blanfordi)
- False serotine bat (Hesperoptenus doriae)
- Gaskell's false serotine (Hesperoptenus gaskelli)
- Tickell's bat (Hesperoptenus tickelli)
- Large false serotine (Hesperoptenus tomesi)
