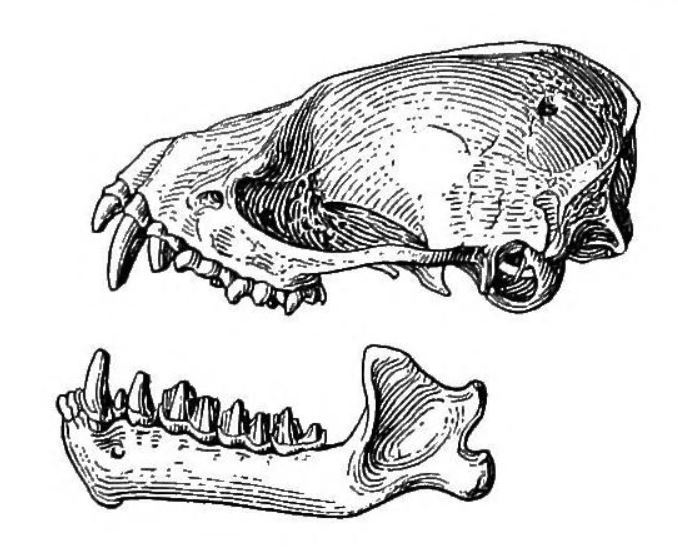

Conservation status
- Least Concern (IUCN 3.1)

Scientific classification
- Kingdom: Animalia
- Phylum: Chordata
- Class: Mammalia
- Order: Chiroptera
- Family: Vespertilionidae
- Genus: Hesperoptenus
- Species: H. tickelli

Binomial name
- Hesperoptenus tickelli Blyth, 1851
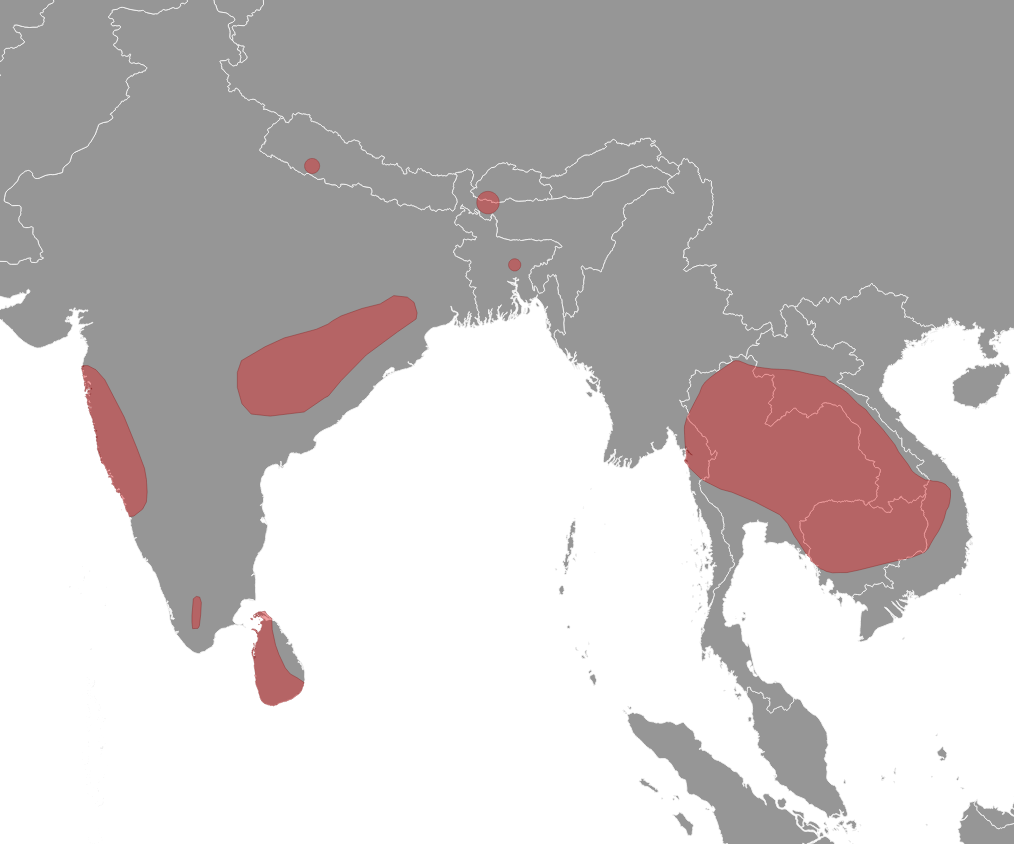

= Tickell's bat =

Species of bat

Tickell's bat (Hesperoptenus tickelli) is a species of vesper bat. It can be found in Bangladesh Bhutan, Cambodia, possibly China, India, Myanmar, Nepal, Sri Lanka and Thailand.

== Description ==
Head and body length is 7 cm (2.8 in). Forearm is between 5 and 6 cm (2.0 and 2.4 in) long.

Females are larger than males. Generally color varies from grayish yellow to bright golden brown. Underside grayer and lighter. Fur is soft and dense. Digits of hands and feet are pinkish and the membrane between them is blackish. Inter-femoral membrane is pinkish tending to become black towards the outer margin. Muzzle is broad and swollen. Claws black. Wings are moderately broad, span between 38 and 41 cm (15 and 16 in), and measure about 7 centimetres (2.8 inches) wide. Tail is enclosed in a membrane the tip.
