= Indochinese short-tailed shrew =

Conservation status
- Least Concern (IUCN 3.1)

Scientific classification
- Kingdom: Animalia
- Phylum: Chordata
- Class: Mammalia
- Order: Eulipotyphla
- Family: Soricidae
- Genus: Parablarinella
- Species: P. griselda

Binomial name
- Parablarinella griselda Thomas, 1912
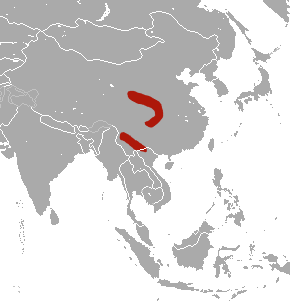
- Indochinese short-tailed shrew range

Species of mammal

The Indochinese short-tailed shrew (Parablarinella griselda) is a species of mammal of the family Soricidae found in China and Vietnam. The species is a semifossorial red-toothed shrew with a stout body and short, slender tail. Although this species was originally classified under Blarinella, recent Cytochrome b analysis suggests this species should be classified under a new genus, placing it in Parablarinella alongside one other species.
