= Anhui short-tailed shrew =

Scientific classification
- Kingdom: Animalia
- Phylum: Chordata
- Class: Mammalia
- Order: Eulipotyphla
- Family: Soricidae
- Genus: Parablarinella
- Species: P. latimaxillata

Binomial name
- Parablarinella latimaxillata Chen & Jiang, 2023

Species of mammal

The Anhui short-tailed shrew (Parablarinella latimaxillata) is a species of shrew described in 2023. It is endemic to the Dabie Mountains, China, and only known from its type locality, Yaoluoping Nature Reserve in Anhui where it occurs in broad-leaf deciduous forests at elevations of 1,100–1,700 m (3,600–5,600 ft) above sea level.

== See also ==
- List of living mammal species described in the 2020s
