= Asiatic short-tailed shrew =

Conservation status
- Near Threatened (IUCN 3.1)

Scientific classification
- Kingdom: Animalia
- Phylum: Chordata
- Class: Mammalia
- Order: Eulipotyphla
- Family: Soricidae
- Genus: Blarinella
- Species: B. quadraticauda

Binomial name
- Blarinella quadraticauda Milne-Edwards, 1872
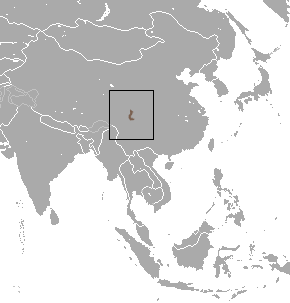
- Asiatic short-tailed shrew range

Species of mammal

The Asiatic short-tailed shrew (Blarinella quadraticauda) is one of three species of shrew in the genus Blarinella. It is in the family Soricidae and is endemic to China.
