= Lao Chải, Tuyên Quang =

Lao Chải
- Rural commune
- Location in Vietnam
- Coordinates: 22.82944°N 104.77306°E
- Country: Vietnam
- Province: Tuyên Quang
- Time zone: UTC+07:00 (Indochina Time)
- Climate: Aw

Lao Chải is a rural commune (xã) of Tuyên Quang Province, Vietnam.

The entire natural area and population of Xín Chải Commune, Thanh Đức Commune, and Lao Chải Commune are rearranged to form a new commune named Lao Chải Commune.
