= Burmese short-tailed shrew =

Conservation status
- Least Concern (IUCN 3.1)

Scientific classification
- Kingdom: Animalia
- Phylum: Chordata
- Class: Mammalia
- Order: Eulipotyphla
- Family: Soricidae
- Genus: Blarinella
- Species: B. wardi

Binomial name
- Blarinella wardi Thomas, 1915
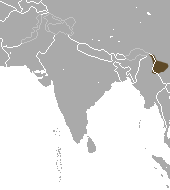
- Burmese short-tailed shrew range

Species of mammal

The Burmese short-tailed shrew (Blarinella wardi) is one of three species of shrew in the genus Blarinella. It is in the family Soricidae and is found in China and Myanmar. Its natural habitat is subtropical or tropical dry forests.
