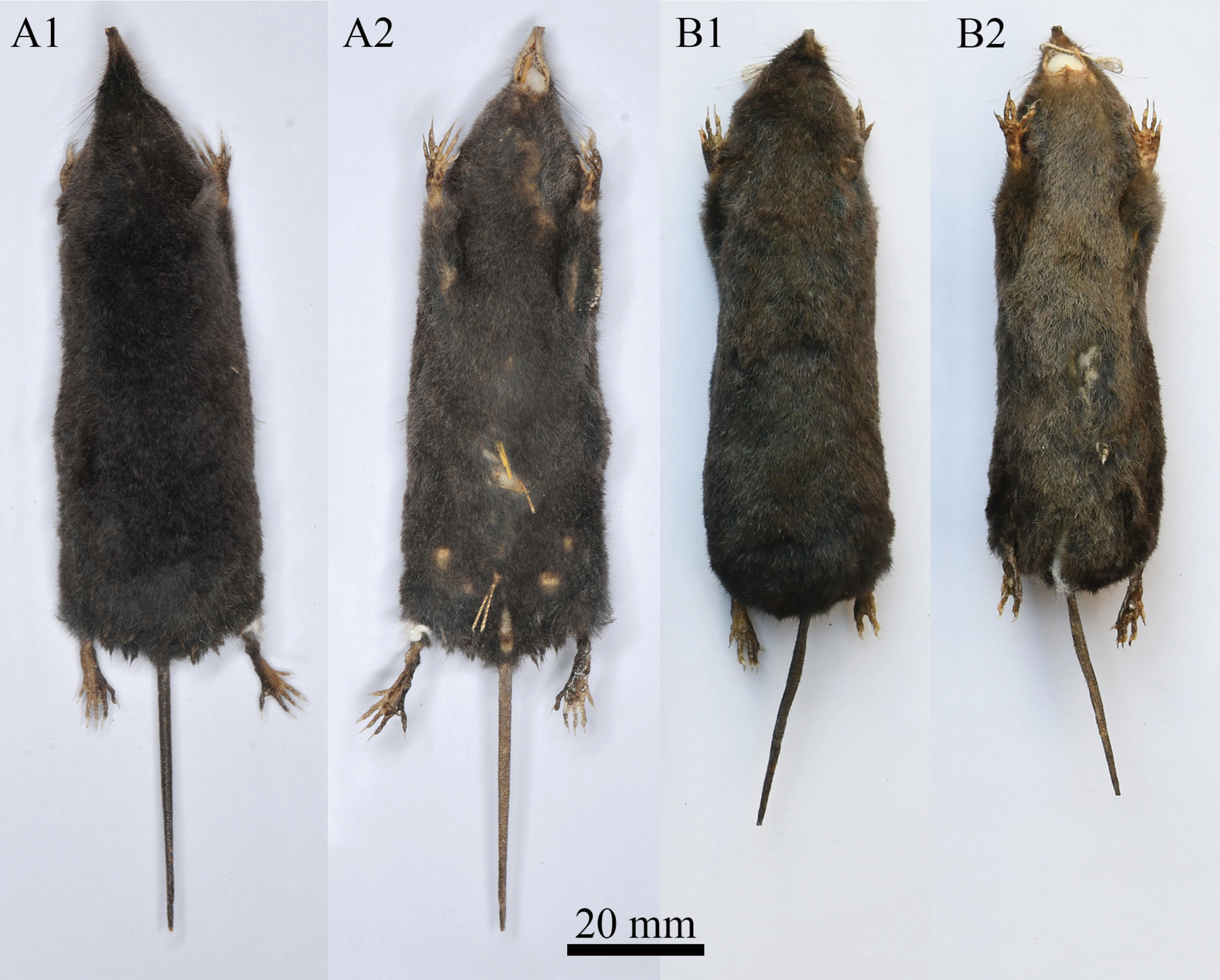
- Skins of Soriculus beibengensis (left) and Soriculus minor (right)

Scientific classification
- Kingdom: Animalia
- Phylum: Chordata
- Class: Mammalia
- Order: Eulipotyphla
- Family: Soricidae
- Tribe: Nectogalini
- Genus: Soriculus; Blyth, 1854

Species
- Soriculus nigrescens; †Soriculus kashmiriensis?; †Soriculus kubinyi?; For others, see text

= Soriculus =

Genus of shrew

Soriculus is a genus of shrew native to the Himalayas, the adjacent Hengduan Mountains and surrounding areas. There was historically only one recognised species, Soriculus nigrescens (as other extant species previously assigned to the genus had been transferred to other genera), though from 2023 onwards additional living species of the genus were proposed.

== Taxonomy ==
The genus Soriculus is placed within the tribe Nectogalini. Several former species of the genus has been moved to other genera such as Chodsigoa and Episoriculus. Species from the extinct European genus Asoriculus were also included here at one point. Currently the genus contains the extinct species Soriculus kashmiriensis and Soriculus kubinyi, although in its description S. kashmiriensis was noted for being most closely related to species now placed in the genus Chodsigoa. DNA research has confirmed the close relationship of Soriculus with the recently extinct Asoriculus and Nesiotites shrews from Europe.

Until 2023, only a single species Soriculus nigrescens, was generally considered valid. In 2023 two additional living species belonging to the genus, Soriculus nivatus and Soriculus medogensis were proposed, with S. minor, previously regarded as a subspecies of Soriculus nigrescens, being proposed as a distinct valid species. In 2024 the species Soriculus beibengensis was also proposed.

=== Species ===
- Soriculus nigrescens (Gray, 1842) native to the southern Himalayas, from Nepal to northern Myanmar from an altitude of 700 m to 4500 m

==== Proposed species (Note: Not yet recognised by the IUCN, but recognised by the American Society of Mammalogists) ====
- Soriculus minor Dobson, 1890 native to the eastern Himalayas, from Bhutan to northern Myanmar as well as southwest China (northwest Yunnan) at an elevation of 1400 m to 2630 m
- Soriculus nivatus Chen & Jiang, 2023, native to the eastern Himalayas in Tibet, at an altitude of 2560 m to 4200 m
- Soriculus medogensis Chen & Jiang, 2023, only known from southeastern Tibet, at an altitude of 2100 m to 2830 m
- Soriculus beibengensis Pei et al, 2024. only known from southeastern Tibet at an altitude of 1500 m to 2125 m
- Soriculus dexingensis Zhang et al. 2025 Mêdog County, Tibet

== Ecology ==
Species of Soriculus inhabit montane forests. Soriculus nigrescens has been suggested to be fossorial.
