= Blarinella =

Scientific classification
- Domain: Eukaryota
- Kingdom: Animalia
- Phylum: Chordata
- Class: Mammalia
- Order: Eulipotyphla
- Family: Soricidae
- Tribe: Blarinellini
- Genus: Blarinella; Thomas, 1911

Type species
- Sorex quadraticauda

Genus of mammals

Blarinella is a small genus of shrews in the subfamily Soricinae of the family Soricidae. It contains the following two species:

- Asiatic short-tailed shrew (Blarinella quadraticauda)
- Burmese short-tailed shrew (Blarinella wardi)
