= Lesser Taiwanese shrew =

Scientific classification
- Kingdom: Animalia
- Phylum: Chordata
- Class: Mammalia
- Order: Eulipotyphla
- Family: Soricidae
- Genus: Chodsigoa
- Species: C. sodalis

Binomial name
- Chodsigoa sodalis (Thomas, 1913)
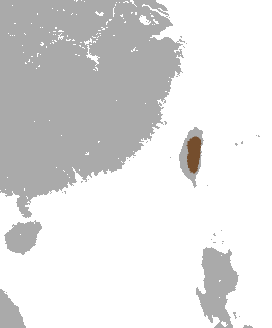
- Lesser Taiwanese shrew range

Synonyms
- Soriculus sodalis; formerly a synonym for Episoriculus fumidus

Species of mammal

The lesser Taiwanese shrew (Chodsigoa sodalis) is a rare species of shrew in the Soricomorpha order.
