= Taiwanese brown-toothed shrew =

Conservation status
- Least Concern (IUCN 3.1)

Scientific classification
- Kingdom: Animalia
- Phylum: Chordata
- Class: Mammalia
- Order: Eulipotyphla
- Family: Soricidae
- Genus: Episoriculus
- Species: E. fumidus

Binomial name
- Episoriculus fumidus (Thomas, 1913)
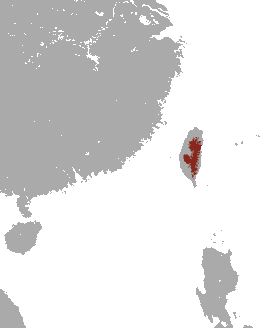
- Taiwanese brown-toothed shrew range

Synonyms
- Soriculus fumidus

Species of mammal

The Taiwanese brown-toothed shrew (Episoriculus fumidus) is a species of shrew in the tribe Nectogalini. It is found only in Taiwan. It prefers dense ground cover in forests and subalpine shrublands in high mountains of central Taiwan. Its placement in Episoriculus has been questioned, with genetic analysis finding that it is more basal within Nectogalini than other members of Episoriculus.

== See also ==
- List of protected species in Taiwan
- List of endemic species of Taiwan
