= Long-tailed mountain shrew =

Conservation status
- Least Concern (IUCN 3.1)

Scientific classification
- Kingdom: Animalia
- Phylum: Chordata
- Class: Mammalia
- Order: Eulipotyphla
- Family: Soricidae
- Genus: Episoriculus
- Species: E. macrurus

Binomial name
- Episoriculus macrurus Blanford, 1888
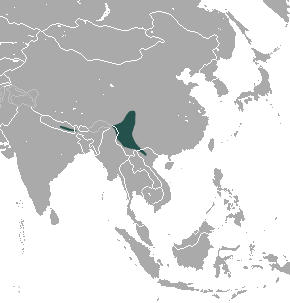
- Long-tailed mountain shrew range

Species of mammal

The long-tailed mountain shrew (Episoriculus macrurus) is a species of mammal in the family Soricidae. It is found in China, Myanmar, Nepal, and Vietnam.
