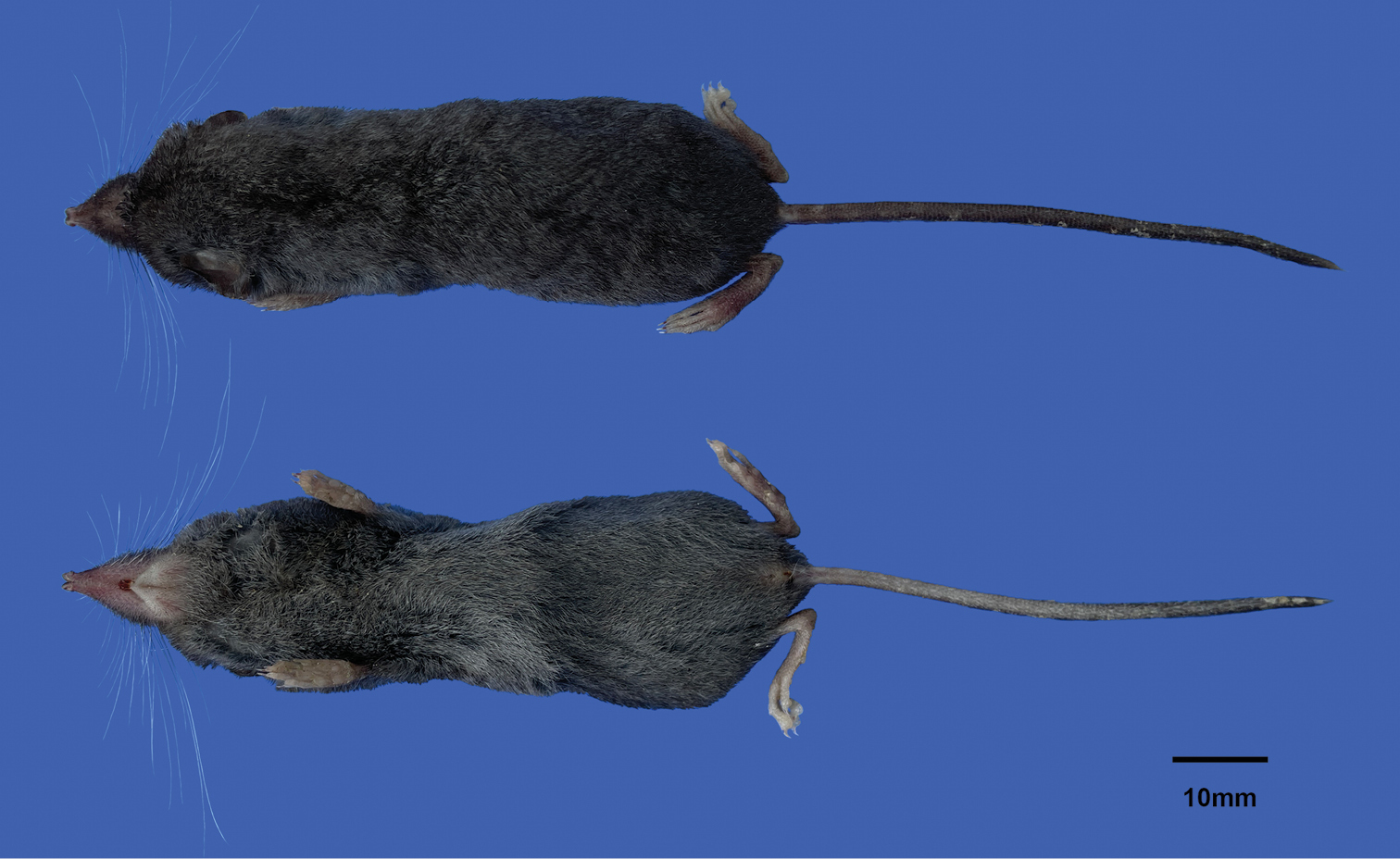

Scientific classification
- Kingdom: Animalia
- Phylum: Chordata
- Class: Mammalia
- Order: Eulipotyphla
- Family: Soricidae
- Tribe: Nectogalini
- Genus: Chodsigoa; Kastchenko, 1907

Type species
- Soriculus salenskii

Species
- See text

= Chodsigoa =

Genus of mammals

Chodsigoa is a genus of shrews in the tribe Nectogalini.

== Species ==
There are currently ten species classified under the genus Chodsigoa:

- Van Sung's shrew (Chodsigoa caovansunga) (Lunde, Musser and Son, 2003)
- ?Chodsigoa hoffmanni sp. nov. (Zhong-Zheng Chen et al., 2017)
- De Winton's shrew (Chodsigoa hypsibia) (de Winton, 1899)
  - Chodsigoa hypsibia parva
- Lamulate shrew (Chodsigoa lamula) (Thomas, 1912)
- Lowe's shrew (Chodsigoa parca) (G. M. Allen, 1923)
  - Chodsigoa parca lowei
  - Chodsigoa parca parca
  - Chodsigoa parca furva (Anthony, 1941)
- Pygmy brown-toothed shrew (Chodsigoa parva) (G. M. Allen, 1923)
- Salenski's shrew (Chodsigoa salenskii) (Kastschenko, 1907)
- Smith's shrew (Chodsigoa smithii) (Thomas, 1911)
- Lesser Taiwanese shrew (Chodsigoa sodalis) (Thomas, 1913)

The name Chodsigoa has also been classified as a subgenus for the genus Soriculus in the same family.
