= Hodgson's brown-toothed shrew =

Conservation status
- Least Concern (IUCN 3.1)

Scientific classification
- Kingdom: Animalia
- Phylum: Chordata
- Class: Mammalia
- Order: Eulipotyphla
- Family: Soricidae
- Genus: Episoriculus
- Species: E. caudatus

Binomial name
- Episoriculus caudatus (Horsfield, 1851)
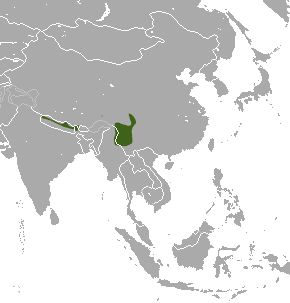
- Hodgsons's brown-toothed shrew range

Species of mammal

Hodgson's brown-toothed shrew (Episoriculus caudatus) is a species of mammal in the family Soricidae. It is found in China, India, and Myanmar.
