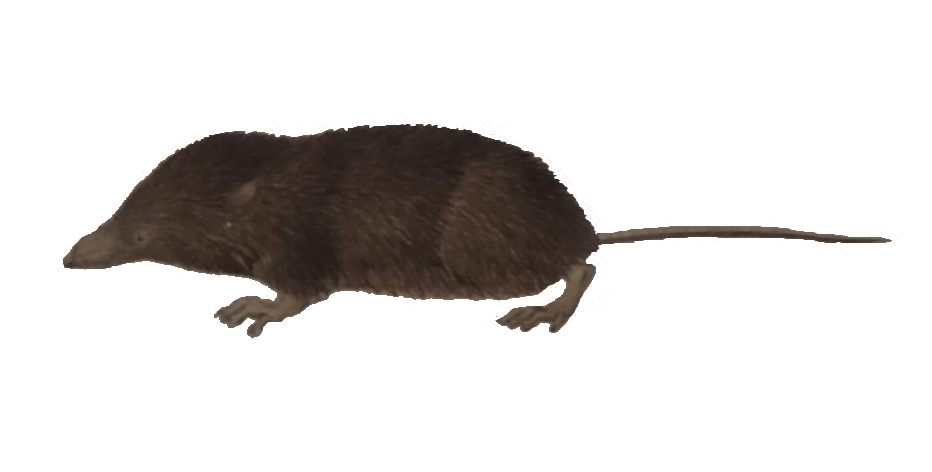

Conservation status
- Least Concern (IUCN 3.1)

Scientific classification
- Kingdom: Animalia
- Phylum: Chordata
- Class: Mammalia
- Order: Eulipotyphla
- Family: Soricidae
- Genus: Soriculus
- Species: S. nigrescens

Binomial name
- Soriculus nigrescens (Gray, 1842)
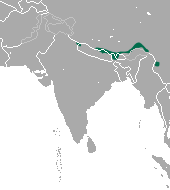
- Himalayan shrew range

= Himalayan shrew =

Species of mammal

The Himalayan shrew (Soriculus nigrescens) is a species of shrew in the subfamily Soricinae (red-toothed shrews) and tribe Nectogalini. It is native to montane forest habitats in the southern Himalayas in Bhutan, China, India, Myanmar, and Nepal, ranging in altitude from 700 metres (2,300 ft) to 4,500 metres (14,800 ft). It is generally considered to be the only species in the genus Soriculus (though other potentially valid species in the genus were described in 2023 and 2024). The body size is relatively, large, the largest in Soriculus, at approximately 17.6 grams (0.62 oz). The fur colour varies from brown to black. The tail is relatively short, about half the length of the combined head and body. The forelimbs and their claws are relatively enlarged, suggesting fossorial (digging) habits for the species.

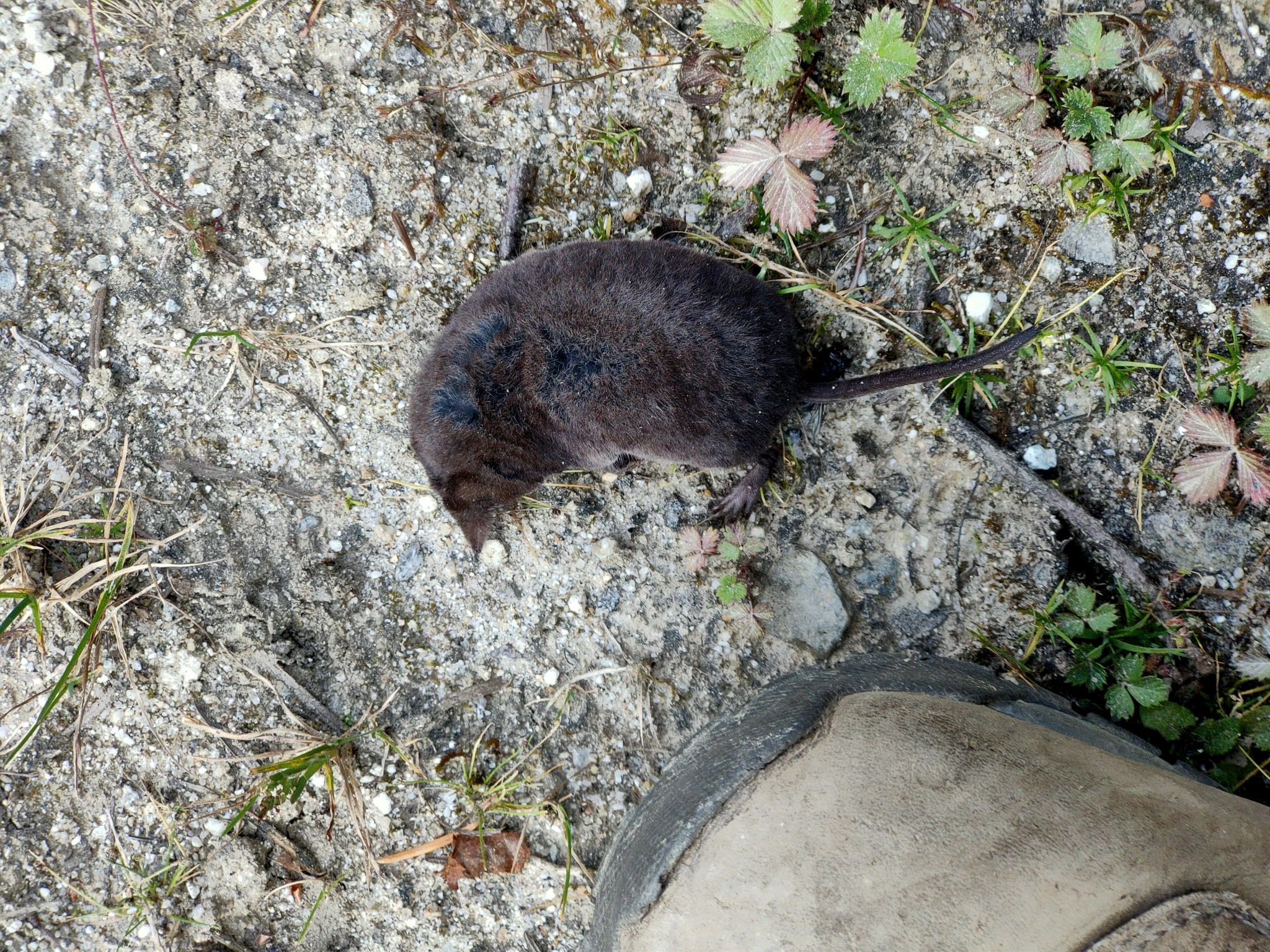
Himalayan shrew (Soriculus nigrescens)

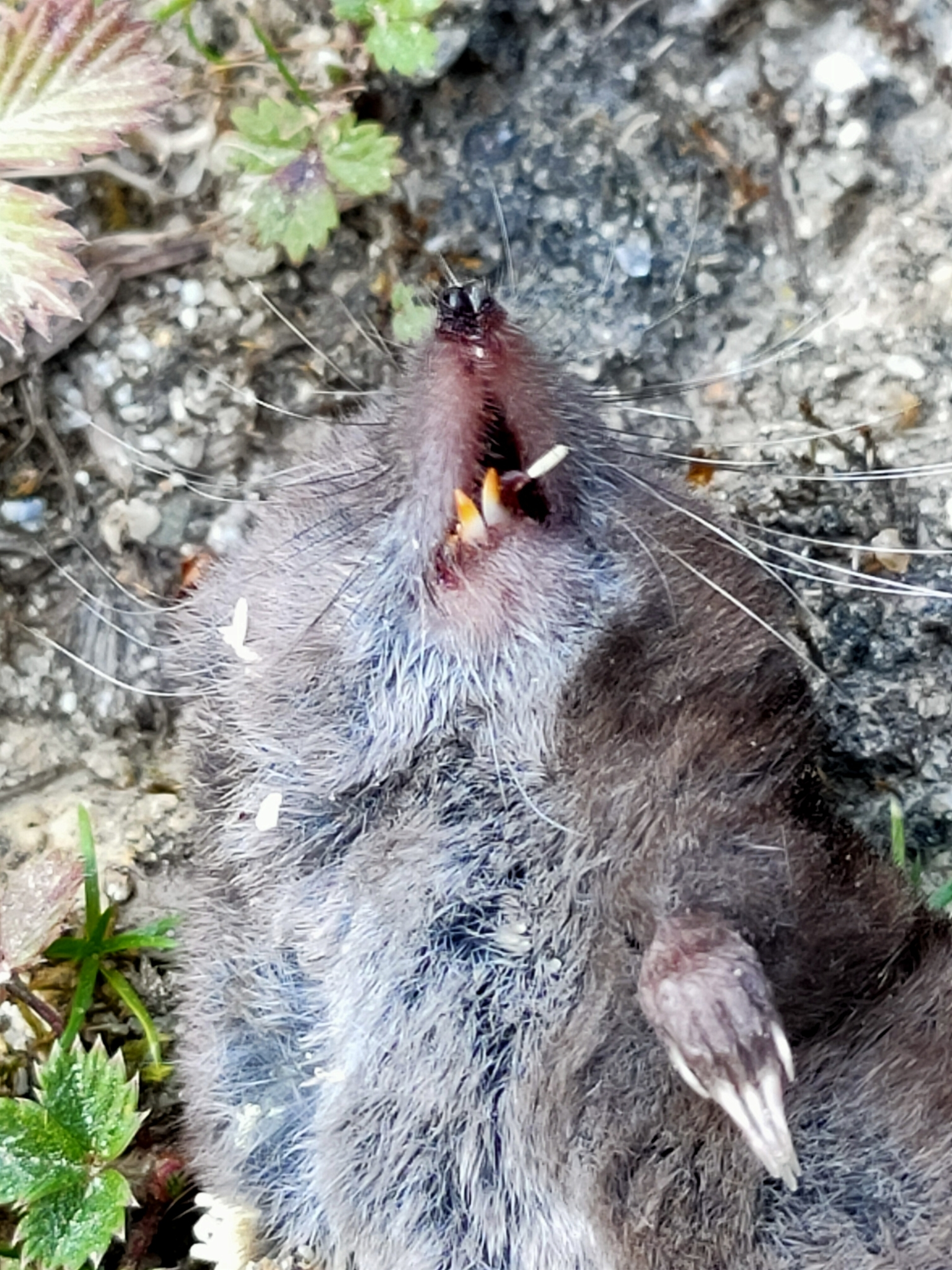
Himalayan shrew(Soriculus nigrescens)
