= Long-tailed brown-toothed shrew =

Conservation status
- Least Concern (IUCN 3.1)

Scientific classification
- Kingdom: Animalia
- Phylum: Chordata
- Class: Mammalia
- Order: Eulipotyphla
- Family: Soricidae
- Genus: Episoriculus
- Species: E. leucops

Binomial name
- Episoriculus leucops (Horsfield, 1855)
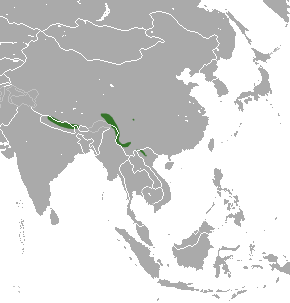
- Long-tailed brown-toothed shrew range

Species of mammal

The long-tailed brown-toothed shrew (Episoriculus leucops) is a species of mammal in the family Soricidae. It is found in China, India, Myanmar, Nepal, and Vietnam.
