= Elegant water shrew =

Conservation status
- Least Concern (IUCN 3.1)

Scientific classification
- Kingdom: Animalia
- Phylum: Chordata
- Class: Mammalia
- Order: Eulipotyphla
- Family: Soricidae
- Tribe: Nectogalini
- Genus: Nectogale; Milne-Edwards, 1870
- Species: N. elegans

Binomial name
- Nectogale elegans Milne-Edwards, 1870
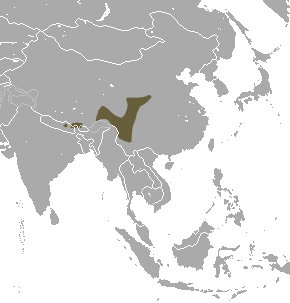
- Elegant water shrew range

Species of mammal

The elegant water shrew (Nectogale elegans) is a species of mammal in the subfamily Soricinae of the family Soricidae. It is the only species within the genus Nectogale. It lives in Sikkim and China.
