= Lowe's shrew =

Conservation status
- Least Concern (IUCN 3.1)

Scientific classification
- Kingdom: Animalia
- Phylum: Chordata
- Class: Mammalia
- Order: Eulipotyphla
- Family: Soricidae
- Genus: Chodsigoa
- Species: C. parca

Binomial name
- Chodsigoa parca (G. M. Allen, 1923)
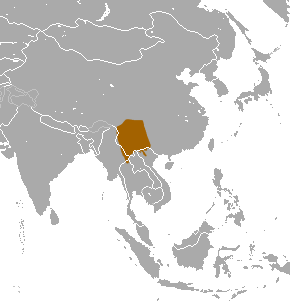
- Lowe's shrew range

Species of mammal

The Lowe's shrew (Chodsigoa parca) is a species of mammal in the family Soricidae. It is found in China, Myanmar, Thailand, and Vietnam.
