= De Winton's shrew =

Conservation status
- Least Concern (IUCN 3.1)

Scientific classification
- Kingdom: Animalia
- Phylum: Chordata
- Class: Mammalia
- Order: Eulipotyphla
- Family: Soricidae
- Genus: Chodsigoa
- Species: C. hypsibius

Binomial name
- Chodsigoa hypsibius de Winton, 1899
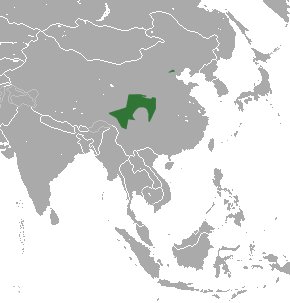
- De Winton's shrew range

Species of mammal

The De Winton's shrew (Chodsigoa hypsibius) is a species of mammal in the family Soricidae. It is endemic to central China, where it occurs primarily in the Hengduan Shan mountains at altitudes between 1,200 metres (3,900 ft) and 3,500 metres (11,500 ft). There are several other populations in East Xizang, the Qinling Shan mountains, and the Eastern Tombs in Hebei. The latter one is found a lower altitude than the others, at around 300 metres (980 ft).

Chodsigoa hypsibius was described by William Edward de Winton in 1899. It has two subspecies, Chodsigoa hypsibius hypsibia and C. h. larvarum.
