= Himalayan water shrew =

Conservation status
- Least Concern (IUCN 3.1)

Scientific classification
- Kingdom: Animalia
- Phylum: Chordata
- Class: Mammalia
- Order: Eulipotyphla
- Family: Soricidae
- Genus: Chimarrogale
- Species: C. himalayica

Binomial name
- Chimarrogale himalayica (Gray, 1842)
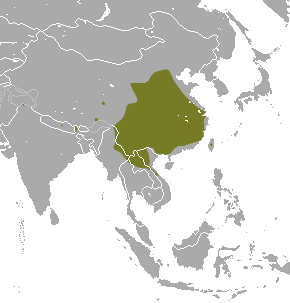
- Himalayan water shrew range

Species of mammal

The Himalayan water shrew (Chimarrogale himalayica) is a species of mammal in the family Soricidae. It is found in China, India, Japan, Laos, Myanmar, Taiwan, and Vietnam.
