= List of mammals of Nepal =

This list of mammals of Nepal presents mammal species recorded in Nepal, of which one is critically endangered, eleven are endangered, twenty are vulnerable, and four are near threatened. The following tags are used to highlight each species' conservation status as assessed on the IUCN Red List:

EX	Extinct	No reasonable doubt that the last individual has died.
EW	Extinct in the wild	Known only to survive in captivity or as a naturalized populations well outside its previous range.
CR	Critically endangered	The species is in imminent risk of extinction in the wild.
EN	Endangered	The species is facing an extremely high risk of extinction in the wild.
VU	Vulnerable	The species is facing a high risk of extinction in the wild.
NT	Near threatened	The species does not meet any of the criteria that would categorise it as risking extinction but it is likely to do so in the future.
LC	Least concern	There are no current identifiable risks to the species.
DD	Data deficient	There is inadequate information to make an assessment of the risks to this species.

== Order: Artiodactyla (even-toed ungulates) ==
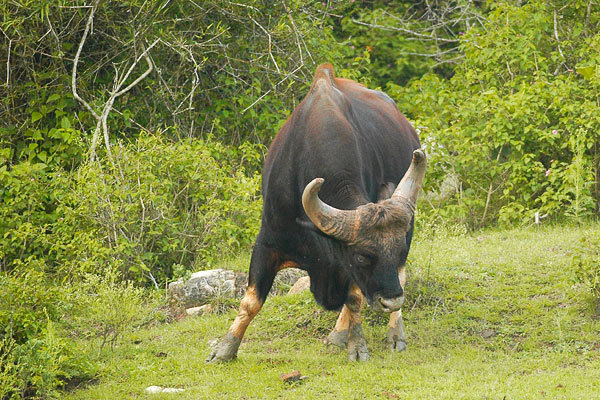
Gaur

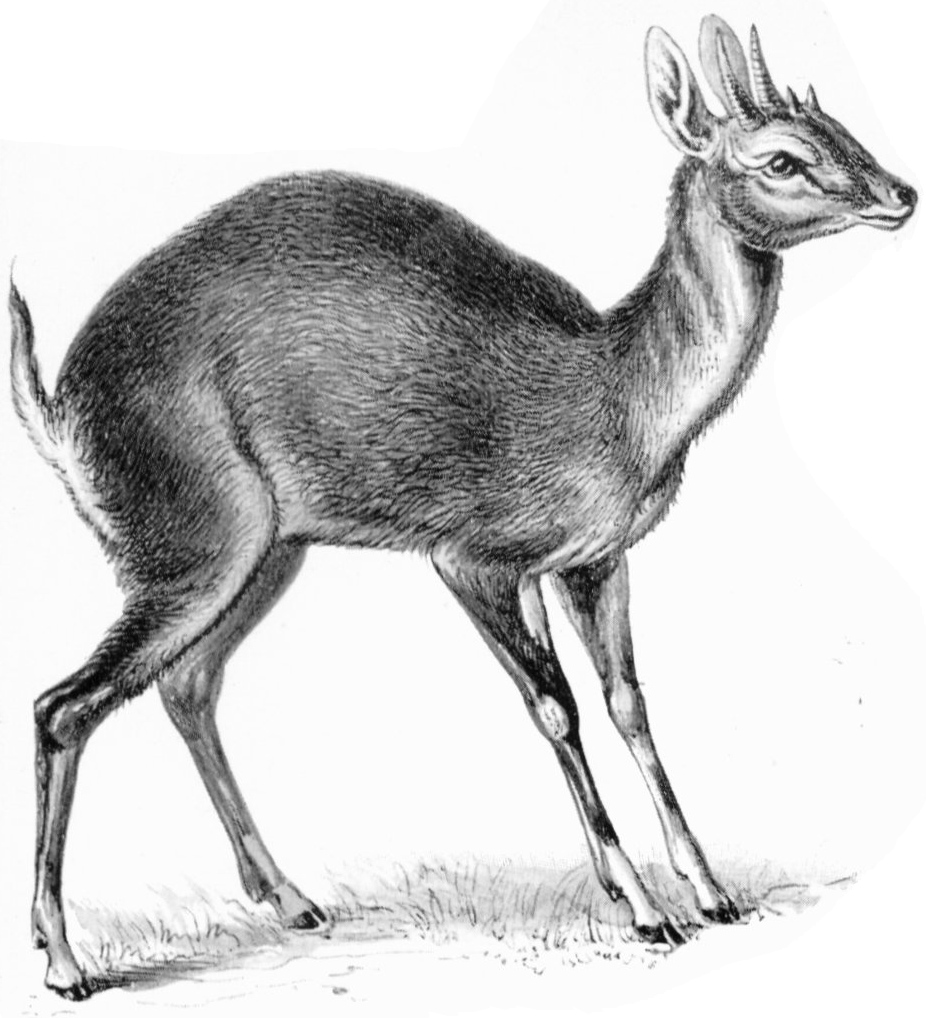
Four-horned antelope

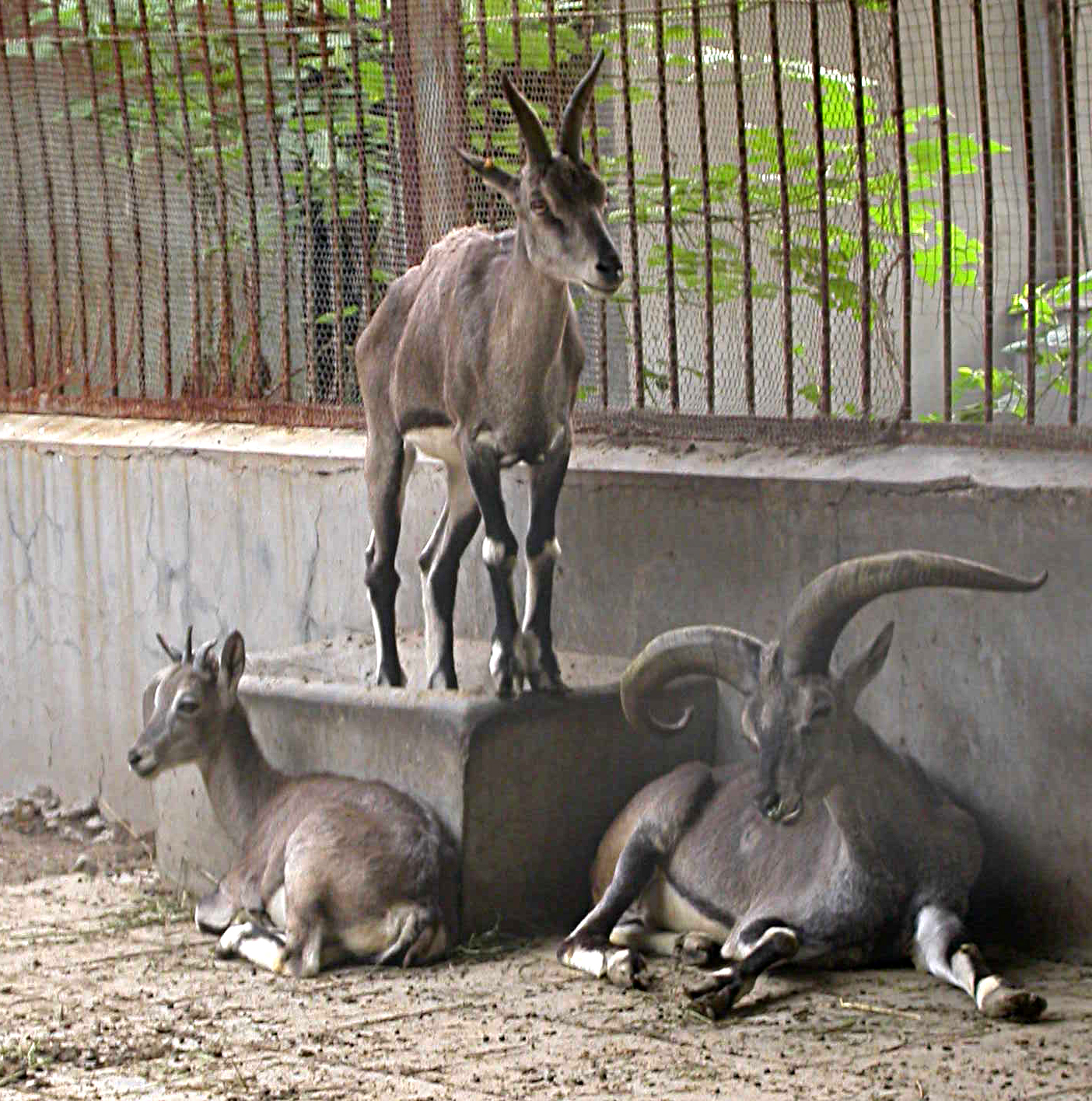
Bharal

The even-toed ungulates are ungulates whose weight is borne about equally by the third and fourth toes, rather than mostly or entirely by the third as in perissodactyls. There are about 220 artiodactyl species, including many that are of great economic importance to humans.

- Family: Bovidae (cattle, antelope, sheep, goats)
  - Genus: Antilope
    - Blackbuck, A. cervicapra LC
  - Genus: Bos
    - Gaur, B. gaurus VU
    - Wild yak, B. mutus VU
  - Genus Boselaphus
    - Nilgai, B. tragocamelus LC
  - Genus: Bubalus
    - Wild water buffalo, B. arnee EN
  - Genus: Capricornis
    - Mainland serow, C. sumatraensis VU
      - Himalayan serow, C. s. thar
  - Genus: Hemitragus
    - Himalayan tahr, H. jemlahicus NT
  - Genus: Naemorhedus
    - Himalayan goral N. goral NT
  - Genus: Ovis
    - Argali, O. ammon NT
  - Genus: Pseudois
    - Bharal, P. nayaur LC
  - Genus: Tetracerus
    - Four-horned antelope, T. quadricornis VU
- Family: Cervidae (deer)
  - Genus: Axis
    - Chital, A. axis LC
    - Indian hog deer, A. porcinus EN
  - Genus: Muntiacus
    - Indian muntjac, M. muntjak LC
  - Genus: Rucervus
    - Barasingha, R. duvaucelii VU
  - Genus: Rusa
    - Sambar deer, R. unicolor VU
- Family: Moschidae
  - Genus: Moschus
    - Alpine musk deer, M. chrysogaster EN
    - Black musk deer, M. fuscus EN
    - White-bellied musk deer, M. leucogaster EN
- Family: Suidae (pigs)
  - Genus: Sus
    - Wild boar, S. scrofa LC
- Family: Tragulidae
  - Genus: Moschiola
    - Indian spotted chevrotain, M. indica LC

== Order: Carnivora (carnivorans) ==
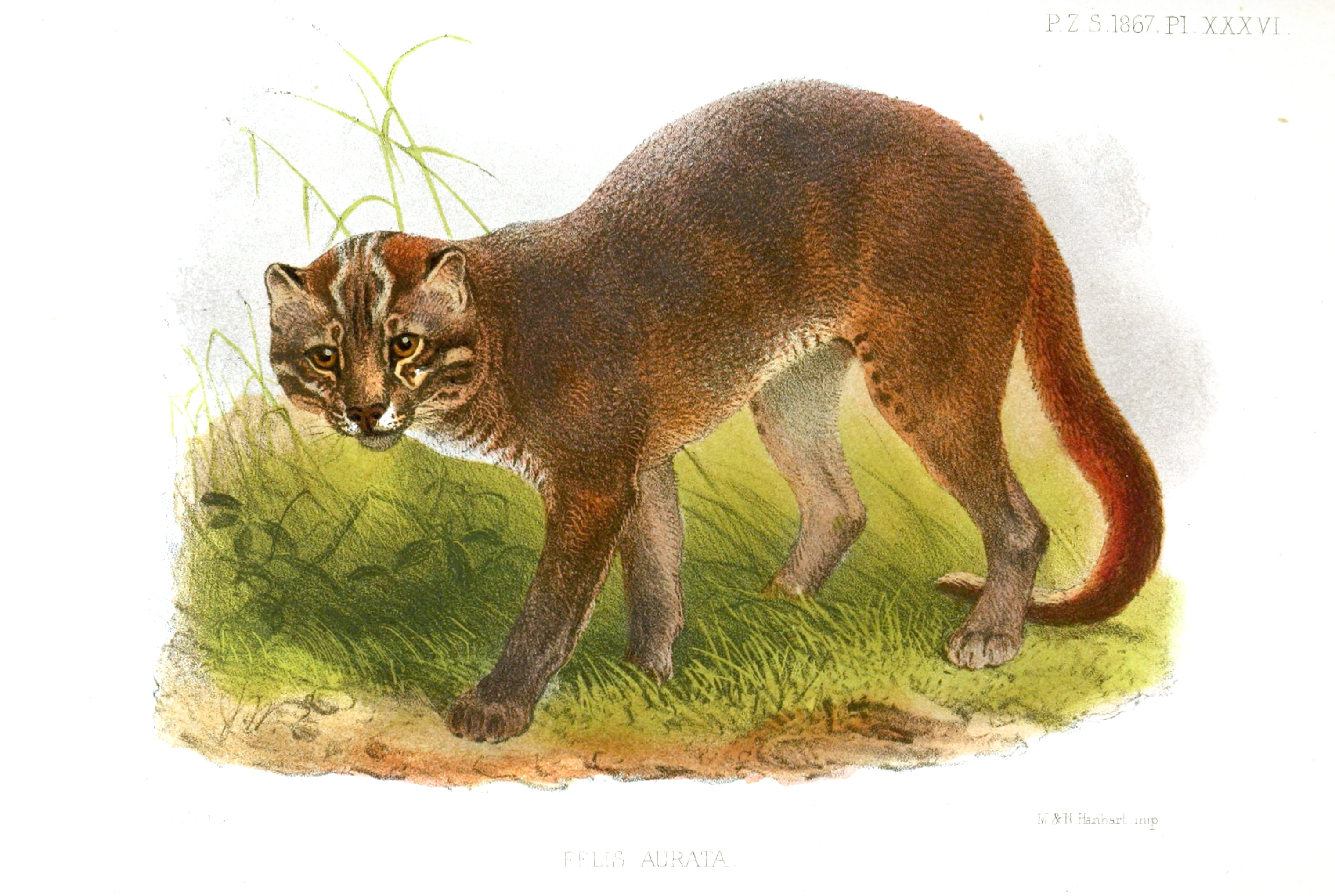
Asian golden cat

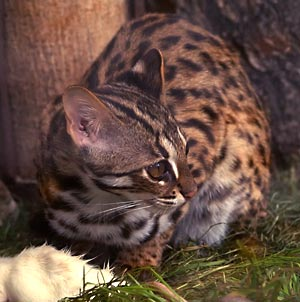
Leopard cat

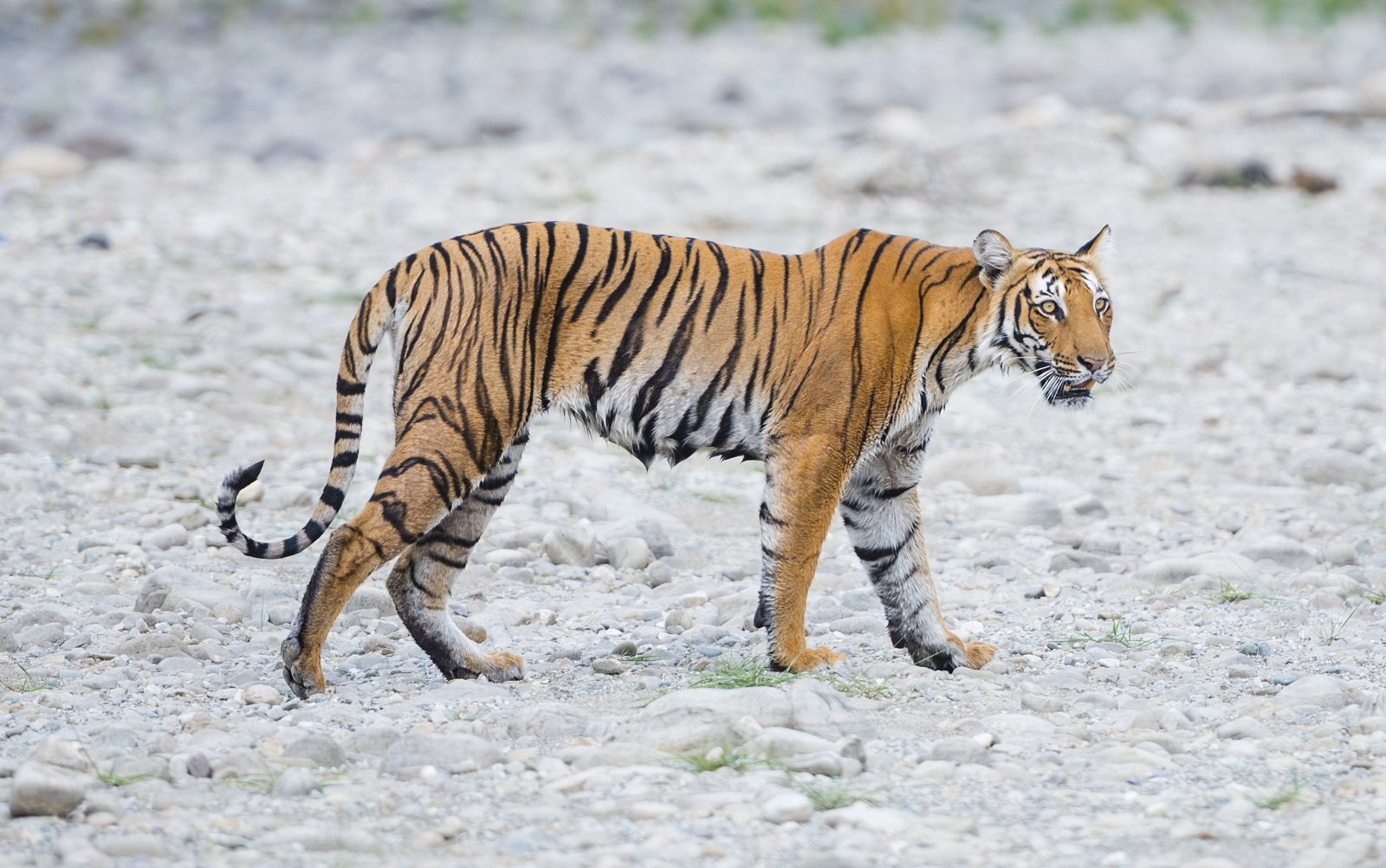
Tiger

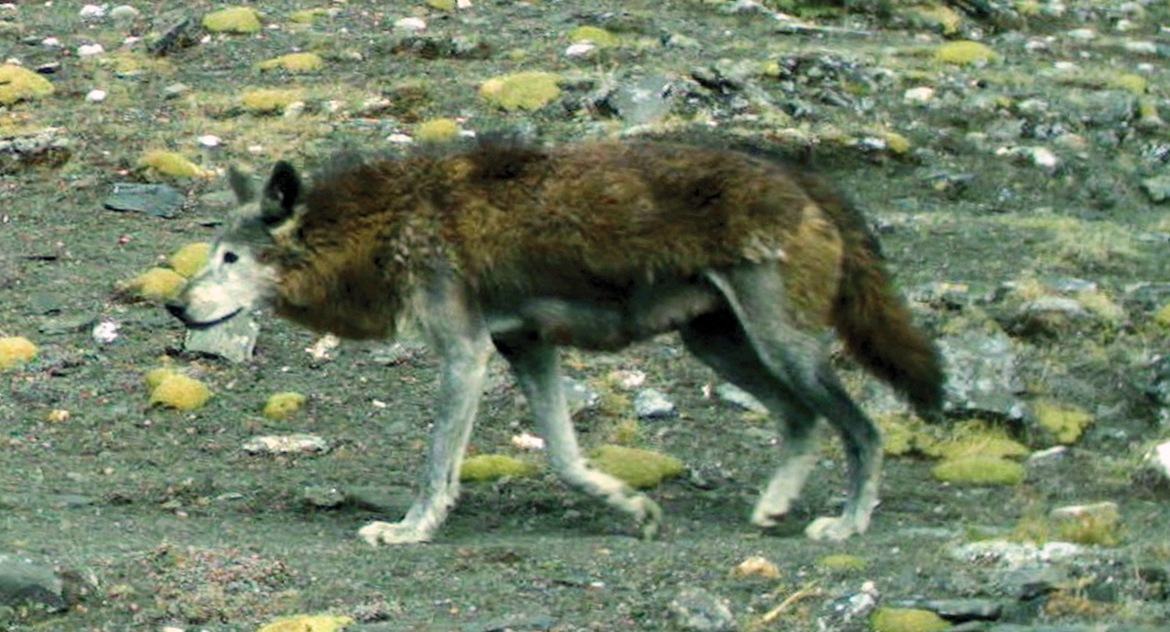
Himalayan wolf in Annapurna Conservation Area

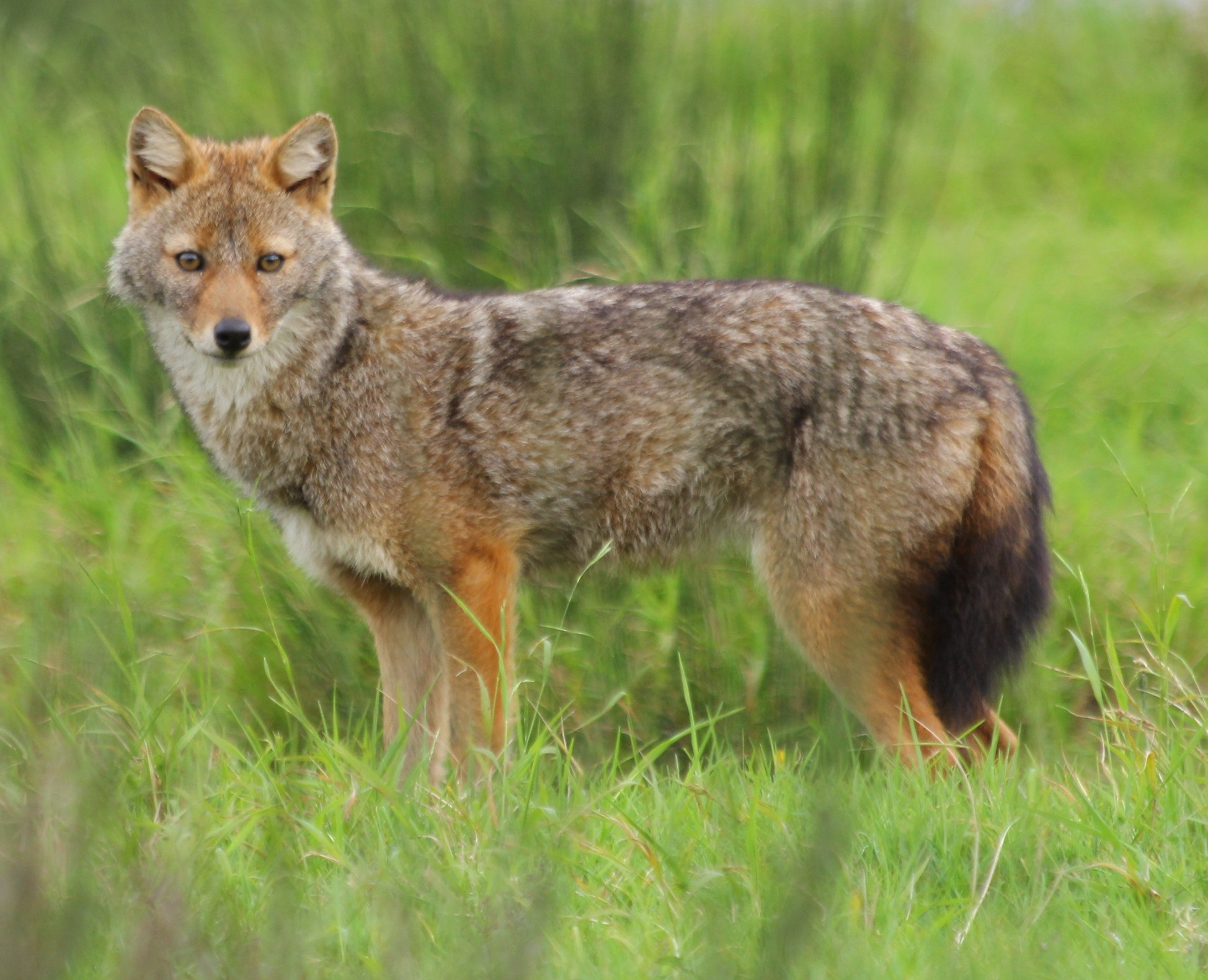
Golden jackal

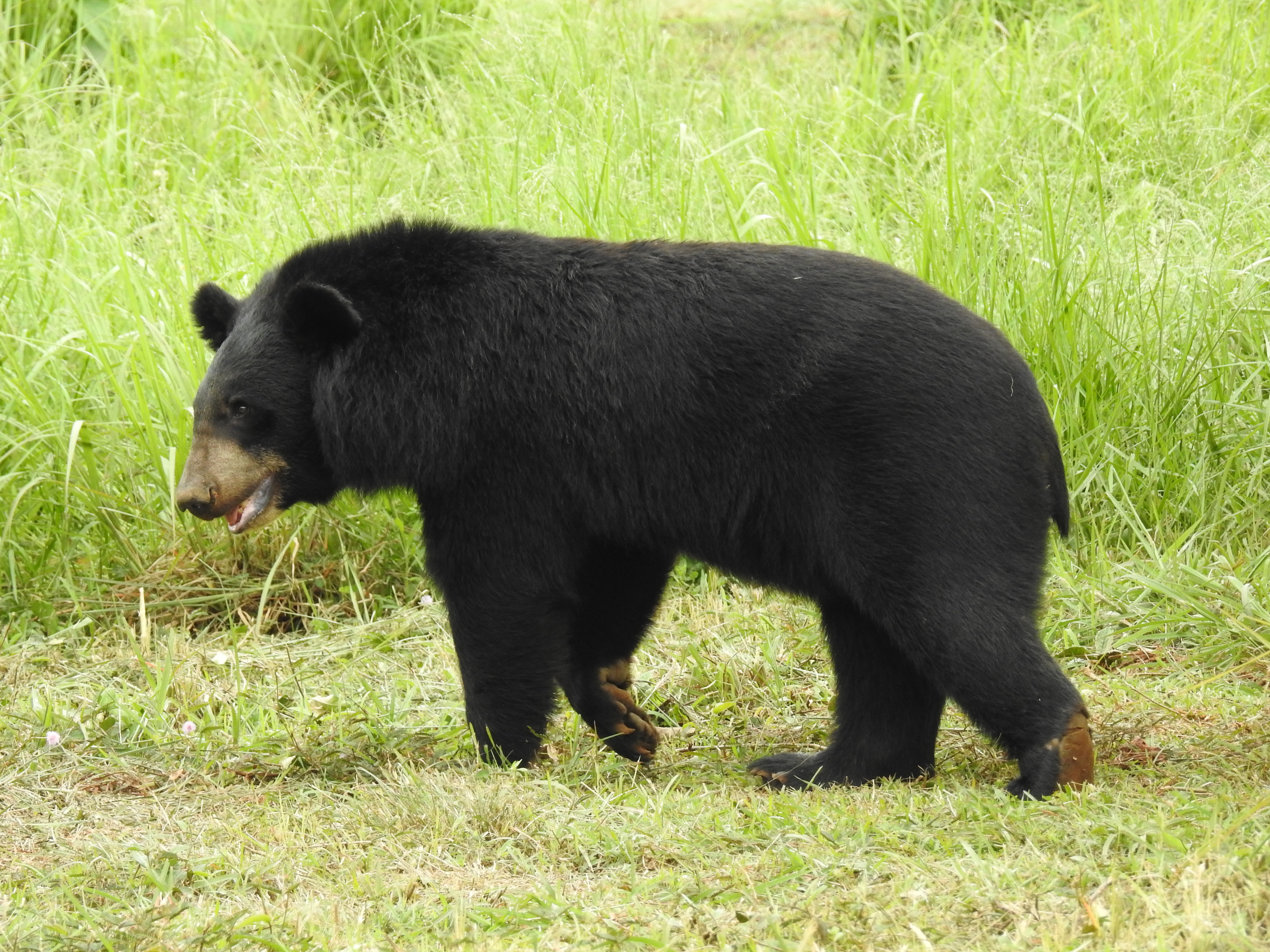
Asian black bear

There are over 260 species of carnivorans; the majority primarily eat meat. They have a characteristic skull shape and dentition.

- Suborder: Feliformia
  - Family: Felidae (cats)
    - Subfamily: Felinae
      - Genus: Catopuma
        - Asian golden cat, C. temminckii NT
      - Genus: Felis
        - Jungle cat, F. chaus LC
      - Genus: Lynx
        - Eurasian lynx, L. lynx LC
      - Genus: Otocolobus
        - Pallas's cat, O. manul LC
      - Genus: Prionailurus
        - Leopard cat, P. bengalensis LC
        - Rusty-spotted cat, P. rubiginosus NT
        - Fishing cat, P. viverrinus VU
    - Subfamily: Pantherinae
      - Genus: Neofelis
        - Clouded leopard, N. nebulosa VU
      - Genus: Panthera
        - Leopard, P. pardus VU
          - Indian leopard, P. p. fusca
        - Tiger, P. tigris EN
          - Bengal tiger, P. t. tigris
        - Snow leopard, P. uncia VU
  - Family: Viverridae
    - Subfamily: Paradoxurinae
      - Genus: Arctictis
        - Binturong, A. binturong VU
      - Genus: Paradoxurus
        - Asian palm civet, P. hermaphroditus LC
      - Genus: Paguma
        - Masked palm civet, P. larvata LC
    - Subfamily: Viverrinae
      - Genus: Viverra
        - Large Indian civet, V. zibetha LC
      - Genus: Viverricula
        - Small Indian civet, V. indica LC
    - Subfamily: Prionodontinae
      - Genus: Prionodon
        - Spotted linsang, P. pardicolor LC
  - Family: Herpestidae (mongooses)
    - Genus: Urva
      - Small Indian mongoose, U. auropunctatus LC
      - Indian grey mongoose, U. edwardsii LC
      - Ruddy mongoose, U. smithii LC
      - Crab-eating mongoose, U. urva LC
  - Family: Hyaenidae (hyaenas)
    - Genus: Hyaena
      - Striped hyena, H. hyaena LC
- Suborder: Caniformia
  - Family: Ailuridae (lesser panda)
    - Genus: Ailurus
      - Red panda, A. fulgens EN
  - Family: Canidae (dogs, foxes)
    - Genus: Canis
      - Golden jackal, C. aureus LC
      - Gray wolf, C. lupus LC
        - Himalayan wolf, C. l. chanco
    - Genus: Cuon
      - Dhole, C. alpinus EN
    - Genus: Vulpes
      - Bengal fox, V. bengalensis LC
      - Tibetan fox, V. ferrilata LC
      - Red fox, V. vulpes LC
  - Family: Ursidae (bears)
    - Genus: Melursus
      - Sloth bear, M. ursinus VU
    - Genus: Ursus
      - Brown bear, U. arctos LC
        - Himalayan brown bear, U. a. isabellinus
      - Asiatic black bear, U. thibetanus VU
        - Himalayan black bear, U. t. laniger
  - Family: Mustelidae (mustelids)
    - Genus: Aonyx
      - Asian small-clawed otter, A. cinereus VU
    - Genus: Lutrogale
      - Smooth-coated otter, L. perspicillata VU
    - Genus: Martes
      - Yellow-throated marten, M. flavigula LC
    - Genus: Mellivora
      - Honey badger, M. capensis LC
    - Genus: Mustela
      - Mountain weasel, M. altaica NT
      - Yellow-bellied weasel, M. kathiah LC
      - Siberian weasel, M. sibirica LC

== Order: Cetacea (whales) ==
The order Cetacea includes whales, dolphins and porpoises. They are the mammals most fully adapted to aquatic life with a spindle-shaped nearly hairless body, protected by a thick layer of blubber, and forelimbs and tail modified to provide propulsion underwater.

- Suborder: Odontoceti
  - Superfamily: Platanistoidea
    - Family: Platanistidae
      - Genus: Platanista
        - Ganges river dolphin, P. gangetica EN

== Order: Chiroptera (bats) ==
The bats' most distinguishing feature is that their forelimbs are developed as wings, making them the only mammals capable of flight. Bat species account for about 20% of all mammals.

- Family: Pteropodidae (flying foxes, Old World fruit bats)
  - Subfamily: Pteropodinae
    - Genus: Cynopterus
      - Lesser short-nosed fruit bat, C. brachyotis LC
      - Greater short-nosed fruit bat, C. sphinx LC
    - Genus: Macroglossus
      - Long-tongued fruit bat, M. sobrinus LC
    - Genus: Pteropus
      - Indian flying fox, P. giganteus LC
    - Genus: Rousettus
      - Leschenault's rousette, R. leschenaulti LC
    - Genus: Sphaerias
      - Blanford's fruit bat, S. blanfordi LC
- Family: Hipposideridae (leaf nosed bats)
  - Genus: Coelops
    - East Asian tailless leaf-nosed bat, Coelops frithii NT
  - Genus: Hipposideros
    - Ashy roundleaf bat, H. cineraceus LC
    - Fulvus roundleaf bat, Hipposideros fulvus LC
    - Indian roundleaf bat, Hipposideros lankadiva LC
    - Intermediate roundleaf bat, Hipposideros larvatus LC
    - Pomona roundleaf bat, Hipposideros pomona EN
- Family: Megadermatidae
  - Genus: Megaderma (false vampire bats)
    - Greater false vampire bat, Megaderma lyra LC
- Family: Vespertilionidae
  - Subfamily: Kerivoulinae
    - Genus: Kerivoula
      - Painted bat, Kerivoula picta LC
  - Subfamily: Myotinae
    - Genus: Myotis
      - Csorba's mouse-eared bat, Myotis csorbai DD
      - Daubenton's bat, M. daubentonii LC
      - Hodgson's bat, M. formosus LC
      - Kashmir cave bat, Myotis longipes VU
      - Whiskered myotis, Myotis muricola LC
      - Mandelli's mouse-eared bat, Myotis sicarius VU
      - Himalayan whiskered bat, Myotis siligorensis LC
  - Subfamily: Vespertilioninae
    - Genus: Arielulus
      - Black-gilded pipistrelle, A- circumdatus LC
    - Genus: Barbastella
      - Eastern barbastelle, Barbastella leucomelas LC
    - Genus: Eptesicus
      - Sombre bat, Eptesicus tatei DD
    - Genus: Falsistrellus
      - Chocolate pipistrelle, Falsistrellus affinis LC
    - Genus: Hesperoptenus
      - Tickell's bat, Hesperoptenus tickelli LC
    - Genus: Ia
      - Great evening bat, I. io NT
    - Genus: Nyctalus
      - Mountain noctule, Nyctalus montanus LC
    - Genus: Philetor
      - Rohu's bat, Philetor brachypterus LC
    - Genus: Pipistrellus
      - Indian pipistrelle, Pipistrellus coromandra LC
      - Java pipistrelle, Pipistrellus javanicus LC
      - Chocolate pipistrelle, Falsistrellus affinis LC
    - Genus: Scotomanes
      - Harlequin bat, Scotomanes ornatus LC
      - Lesser Asiatic yellow bat, Scotophilus kuhlii LC
      - Greater Asiatic yellow bat, Scotophilus heathii LC
  - Subfamily: Murininae
    - Genus: Murina
      - Hutton's tube-nosed bat, Murina huttoni LC
      - Greater tube-nosed bat, Murina leucogaster LC
  - Subfamily: Miniopterinae
    - Genus: Miniopterus
      - Small bent-winged bat, Miniopterus pusillus LC
      - Common bent-wing bat, M. schreibersii VU
- Family: Molossidae
  - Genus: Chaerephon
    - Wrinkle-lipped free-tailed bat, Chaerephon plicata LC
- Family: Rhinolophidae
  - Subfamily: Rhinolophinae
    - Genus: Rhinolophus
      - Intermediate horseshoe bat, Rhinolophus affinis LC
      - Greater horseshoe bat, R. ferrumequinum LC
      - Blyth's horseshoe bat, R. lepidus LC"
      - Woolly horseshoe bat, R. luctus LC
      - Big-eared horseshoe bat, R. macrotis LC
      - Pearson's horseshoe bat, Rhinolophus pearsoni LC
      - Least horseshoe bat, Rhinolophus pusillus LC
      - Rufous horseshoe bat, Rhinolophus rouxi LC
      - Chinese rufous horseshoe bat, Rhinolophus sinicus LC
      - Little Nepalese horseshoe bat, Rhinolophus subbadius DD
      - Trefoil horseshoe bat, Rhinolophus trifoliatus LC
  - Subfamily: Hipposiderinae
    - Genus: Hipposideros
      - Great roundleaf bat, Hipposideros armiger LC
      - Pomona roundleaf bat, Hipposideros pomona LC

== Order: Lagomorpha (lagomorphs) ==
The lagomorphs comprise two families, Leporidae (hares and rabbits), and Ochotonidae (pikas). Though they can resemble rodents, and were classified as a superfamily in that order until the early 20th century, they have since been considered a separate order. They differ from rodents in a number of physical characteristics, such as having four incisors in the upper jaw rather than two.

- Family: Ochotonidae (pikas)
  - Genus: Ochotona
    - Black-lipped pika, O. curzoniae LC
    - Himalayan pika, O. himalayana LC
    - Large-eared pika, O. macrotis LC
    - Nubra pika, O. nubrica LC
    - Royle's pika, O. roylei LC
- Family: Leporidae (rabbits, hares)
  - Genus: Caprolagus
    - Hispid hare, C. hispidus EN
  - Genus: Lepus
    - Indian hare, L. nigricollis LC
    - Woolly hare, L. oiostolus LC

== Order: Perissodactyla (odd-toed ungulates) ==
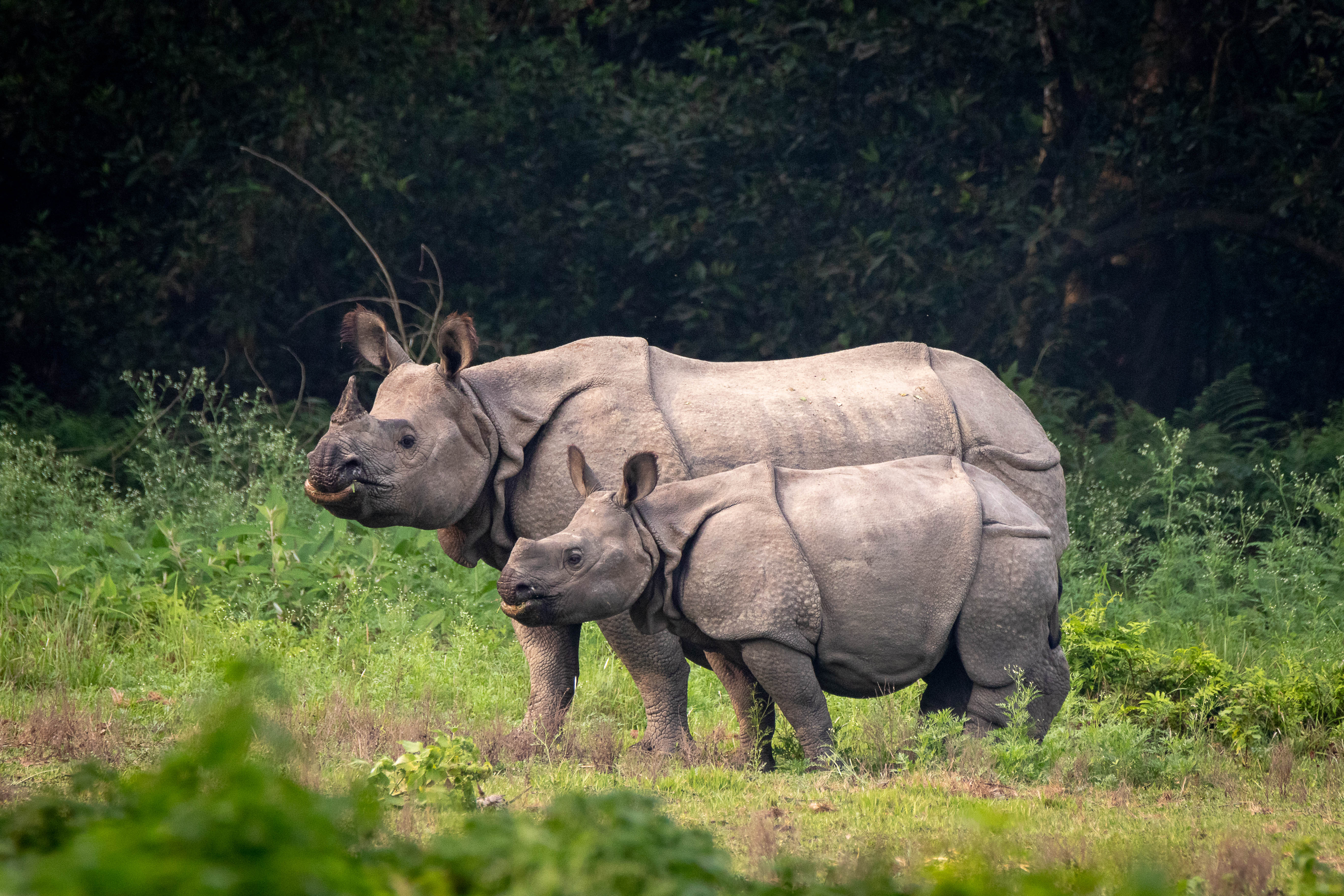
Indian rhinoceros

The odd-toed ungulates are browsing and grazing mammals. They are usually large to very large, and have relatively simple stomachs and a large middle toe.

- Family: Equidae
  - Genus: Equus
    - Kiang, E. kiang LC
- Family: Rhinocerotidae
  - Genus: Rhinoceros
    - Indian rhinoceros, R. unicornis VU

== Order: Primates ==
The order Primates contains humans and their closest relatives: lemurs, lorisoids, monkeys, and apes.

- Suborder: Haplorhini
  - Infraorder: Simiiformes
    - Parvorder: Catarrhini
      - Superfamily: Cercopithecoidea
        - Family: Cercopithecidae (Old World monkeys)
          - Genus: Macaca
            - Assam macaque, M. assamensis NT
            - Rhesus macaque, M. mulatta LC
          - Subfamily: Colobinae
            - Genus: Semnopithecus
              - Tarai gray langur, S. hector NT
              - Nepal gray langur, S. schistaceus LC

== Order: Proboscidea (elephants) ==
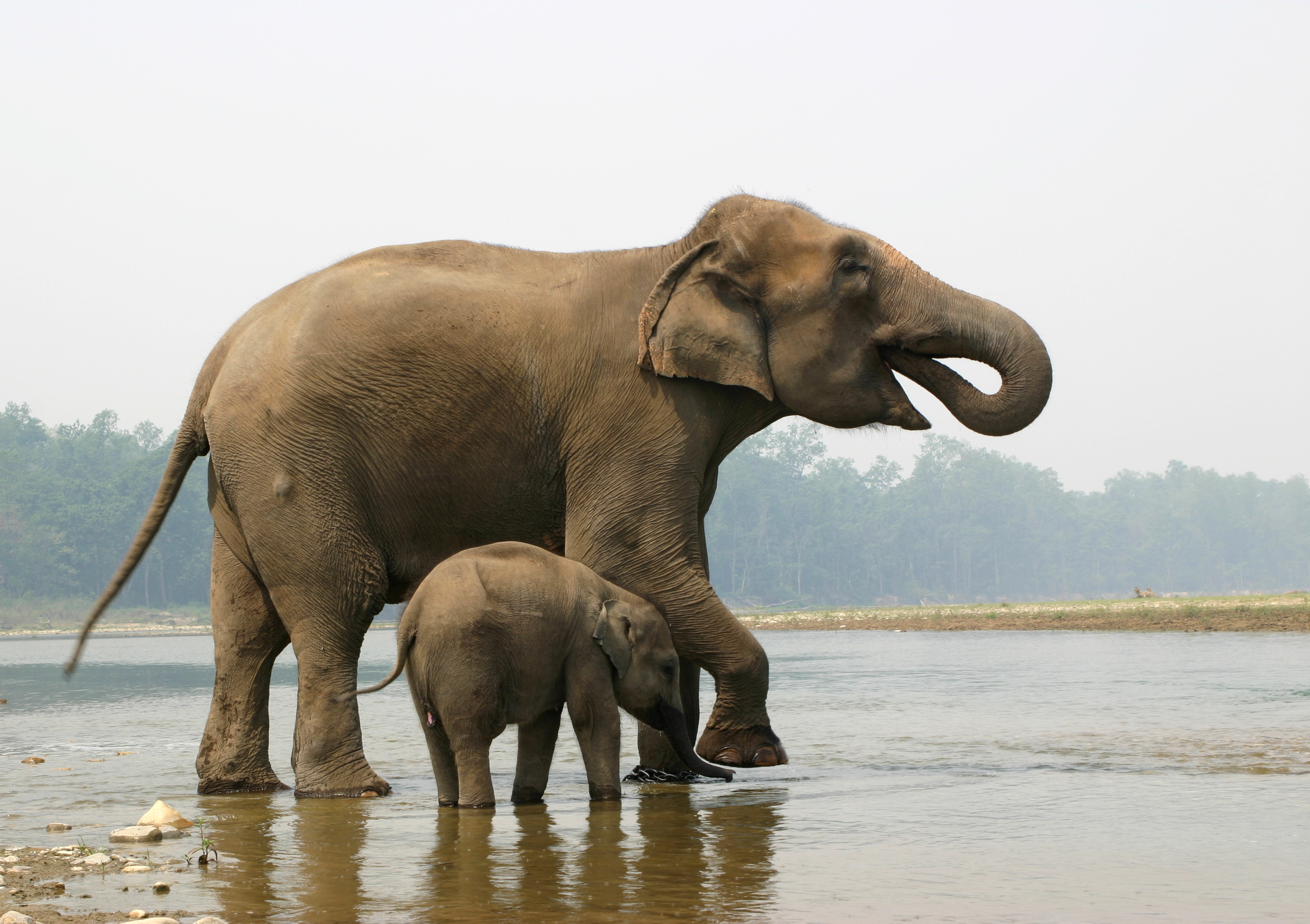
Asian elephant

The elephants comprise three living species and are the largest living land animals.

- Family: Elephantidae (elephants)
  - Genus: Elephas
    - Asian elephant, E. maximus EN

== Order: Rodentia (rodents) ==
Rodents make up the largest order of mammals, with over 40% of mammalian species. They have two incisors in the upper and lower jaw which grow continually and must be kept short by gnawing. Most rodents are small though the capybara can weigh up to 45 kg (99 lb).

- Suborder: Hystricognathi
  - Family: Hystricidae (Old World porcupines)
    - Genus: Hystrix
      - Malayan porcupine, H. brachyura LC
      - Indian crested porcupine, H. indica LC
- Suborder: Sciurognathi
  - Family: Sciuridae (squirrels)
    - Subfamily: Ratufinae
      - Genus: Ratufa
        - Black giant squirrel, Ratufa bicolor NT
    - Subfamily: Sciurinae
      - Tribe: Pteromyini
        - Genus: Belomys
          - Hairy-footed flying squirrel, Belomys pearsonii DD
        - Genus: Hylopetes
          - Particolored flying squirrel, Hylopetes alboniger EN
        - Genus: Petaurista
          - Spotted giant flying squirrel, Petaurista elegans LC
          - Hodgson's giant flying squirrel, Petaurista magnificus LC
          - Bhutan giant flying squirrel, Petaurista nobilis NT
          - Red giant flying squirrel, Petaurista petaurista LC
    - Subfamily: Callosciurinae
      - Genus: Callosciurus
        - Irrawaddy squirrel, C. pygerythrus LC
      - Genus: Dremomys
        - Orange-bellied Himalayan squirrel, Dremomys lokriah LC
      - Genus: Funambulus
        - Northern palm squirrel, Funambulus pennantii LC
      - Genus: Tamiops
        - Himalayan striped squirrel, Tamiops macclellandi LC
    - Subfamily: Xerinae
      - Genus: Marmota
        - Himalayan marmot, M. himalayana LC
  - Family: Spalacidae
    - Subfamily: Rhizomyinae
      - Genus: Cannomys
        - Lesser bamboo rat, Cannomys badius LC
  - Family: Cricetidae
    - Subfamily: Cricetinae
      - Genus: Urocricetus
        - Tibetan dwarf hamster, Urocricetus alticola LC
    - Subfamily: Arvicolinae
      - Genus: Alticola
        - Stoliczka's mountain vole, Alticola stoliczkanus LC
        - Strachey's mountain vole, Alticola stracheyi LC
      - Genus: Microtus
        - Sikkim vole, Microtus sikimensis LC
  - Family: Muridae (mice, rats, voles, gerbils, hamsters, etc.)
    - Subfamily: Gerbillinae
      - Genus: Tatera
        - Indian gerbil, Tatera indica LC
    - Subfamily: Murinae
      - Genus: Apodemus
        - Himalayan field mouse, Apodemus gurkha LC
        - Kashmir field mouse, Apodemus rusiges LC
        - Ward's field mouse, Apodemus wardi LC
      - Genus: Bandicota
        - Greater bandicoot rat, Bandicota indica LC
      - Genus: Dacnomys
        - Millard's rat, Dacnomys millardi LC
      - Genus: Diomys
        - Crump's mouse, Diomys crumpi DD
      - Genus: Millardia
        - Soft-furred rat, Millardia meltada LC
      - Genus: Mus
        - Little Indian field mouse, Mus booduga LC
        - Fawn-colored mouse, Mus cervicolor LC
        - Cook's mouse, Mus cookii LC
        - Rock-loving mouse, Mus saxicola LC
        - Earth-colored mouse, Mus terricolor LC
      - Genus: Niviventer
        - Smoke-bellied rat, Niviventer eha LC
        - Chestnut white-bellied rat, Niviventer fulvescens LC
        - White-bellied rat, Niviventer niviventer LC
      - Genus: Rattus
        - Himalayan field rat, Rattus nitidus LC
        - Sikkim rat, Rattus sikkimensis VU
        - Tanezumi rat, Rattus tanezumi LC
        - Turkestan rat, R. pyctorius LC
      - Genus: Vandeleuria
        - Asiatic long-tailed climbing mouse, Vandeleuria oleracea LC

== Order: Soricomorpha (shrews, moles, and solenodons) ==
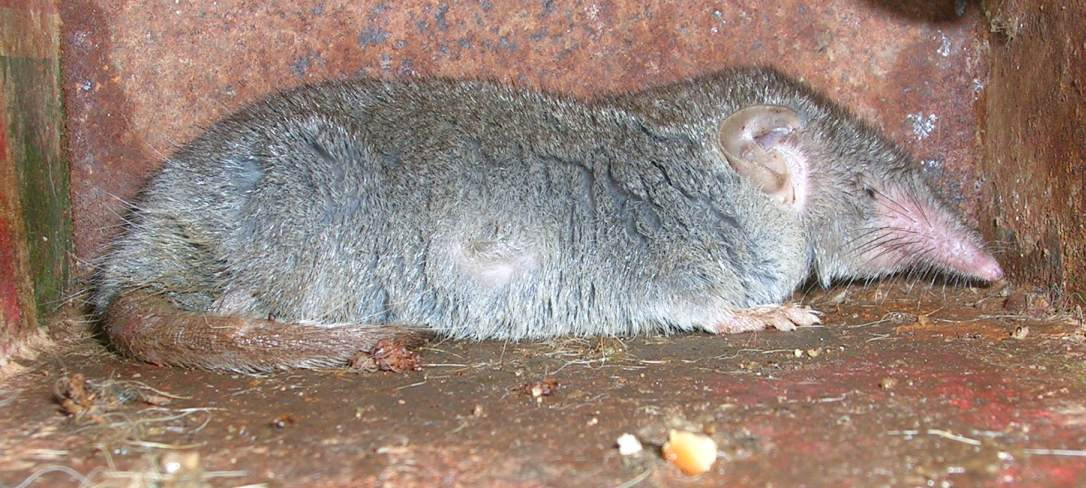
Asian house shrew

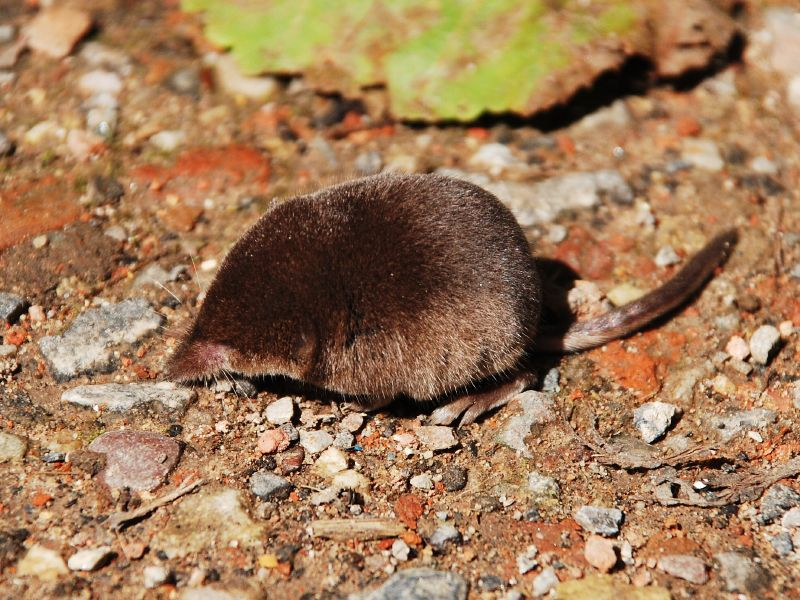
Eurasian pygmy shrew

The Soricomorpha are insectivorous mammals. The shrews and solenodons resemble mice while the moles are stout-bodied burrowers.

- Family: Soricidae (shrews)
  - Subfamily: Crocidurinae
    - Genus: Crocidura
      - Grey shrew, C. attenuata LC
      - Horsefield's shrew, C. horsfieldii LC
    - Genus: Suncus
      - Etruscan shrew, S. etruscus LC
      - Asian house shrew, S. murinus LC
      - Anderson's shrew, Suncus stoliczkanus LC
      - Genus: Soriculus
        - Long-tailed brown-toothed shrew, Soriculus leucops LC
        - Long-tailed mountain shrew, Soriculus macrurus LC
        - Himalayan shrew, Soriculus nigrescens LC
    - Tribe: Soricini
      - Genus: Sorex
        - Eurasian pygmy shrew, Sorex minutus LC
- Family: Talpidae (moles)
  - Subfamily: Talpinae
    - Tribe: Talpini
      - Genus: Euroscaptor
        - Himalayan mole, Euroscaptor micrura LC

== Order: Pholidota (pangolins) ==
The order Pholidota comprises the eight species of pangolin. Pangolins are anteaters and have the powerful claws, elongated snout and long tongue seen in the other unrelated anteater species.

- Family: Manidae
  - Genus: Manis
    - Indian pangolin, M. crassicaudata EN
    - Chinese pangolin, M. pentadactyla CR

== Locally extinct ==
The following species are locally extinct in the country:

- Tibetan antelope, Pantholops hodgsonii
- Pygmy hog, Porcula salvanius

== See also ==
- List of chordate orders
- Lists of mammals by region
- List of prehistoric mammals
- Mammal classification
- List of mammals described in the 2000s
