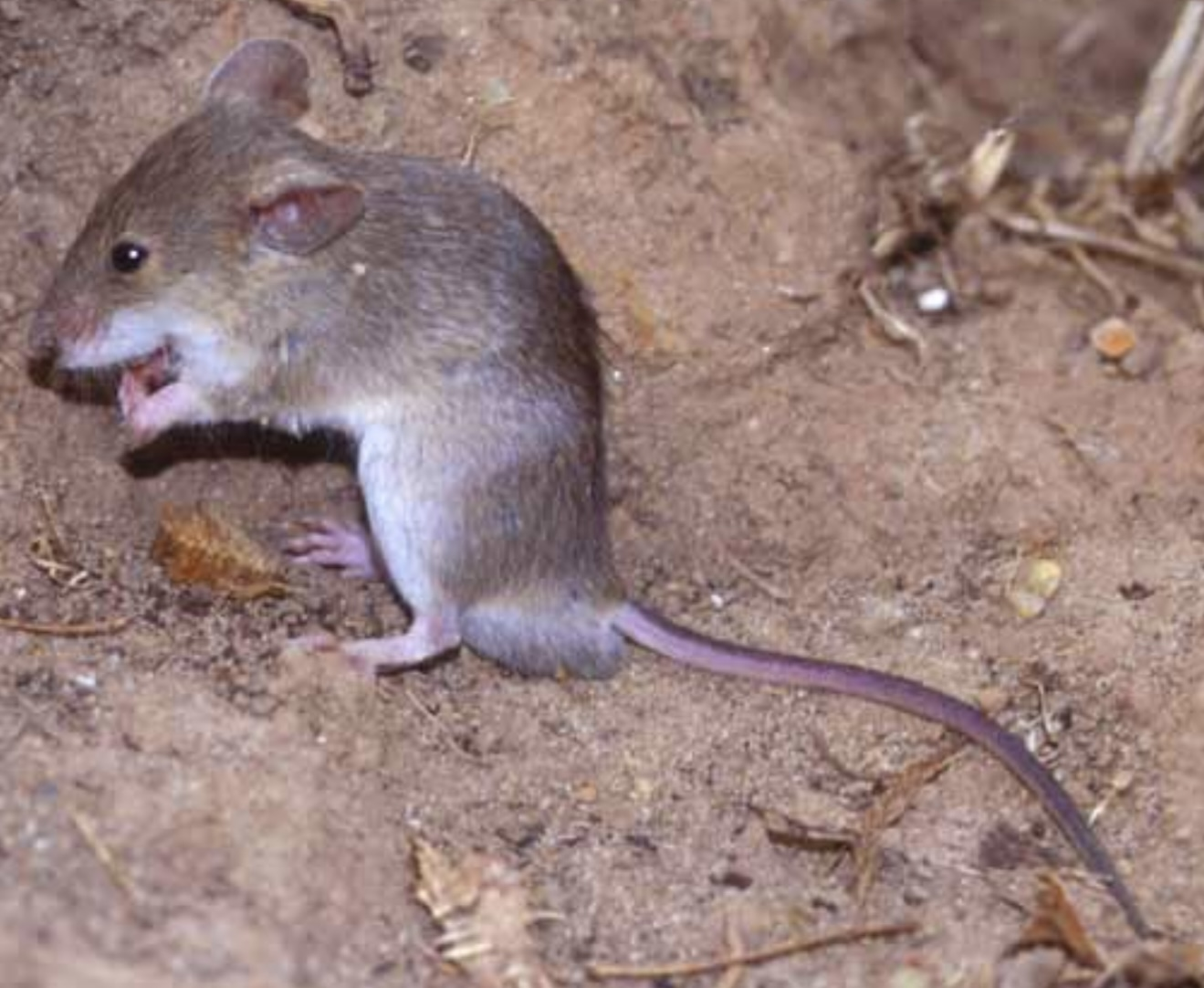

Scientific classification
- Kingdom: Animalia
- Phylum: Chordata
- Class: Mammalia
- Infraclass: Placentalia
- Order: Rodentia
- Family: Muridae
- Genus: Mus
- Subgenus: Mus
- Species: M. nitidulus

Binomial name
- Mus nitidulus Blyth, 1859

= Mus nitidulus =

Species of rodent

Mus nitidulus is a medium-sized rodent of the genus Mus that appears in central Myanmar.

== Origins ==
The name of the species dates back to 1859, but this is an uncertain figure because of the uncertainty that Mus nitidulus was indeed a separate species from Mus cervicolor. In 2007, mainly because of ongoing genetic research into new specimens, M. nitidulus was recognized as a separate species. They are actually more closely related to M. booduga than M. cervicolor. Based on these genetic data, the origin of M. nitidulus is estimated to have occurred 1.3 million years ago. The spread of the species includes the area around the lower reaches of the Irrawaddy.

== Description ==
Mus nitidulus is a medium-sized mouse with a soft, fine, flexible, transparent whiskers. They look similar to M. cervicolor and M. fragilicauda. The underside of the body is light gray, and the sides of the cheeks and nose are white. The animal has large, hairy ears. The feet are white, but sometimes with black hair. It has a fairly hairy coat which is hard to give a clear color (darker at the top, lighter at the bottom). From each tail scale, of which 20 to 26 per cm occur, come about three hairs, which are two or three scales long. The skull ranges from 73 to 93 mm, the tail length 55 to 69 mm, the ear length is 12 to 13 mm, and the weight varies from 16.2 to 18 g. They have 1 + 2 + 2 = 10 mammae.

- This text incorporates translated material from Dutch Wikipedia, which is licensed under the GFDL.
