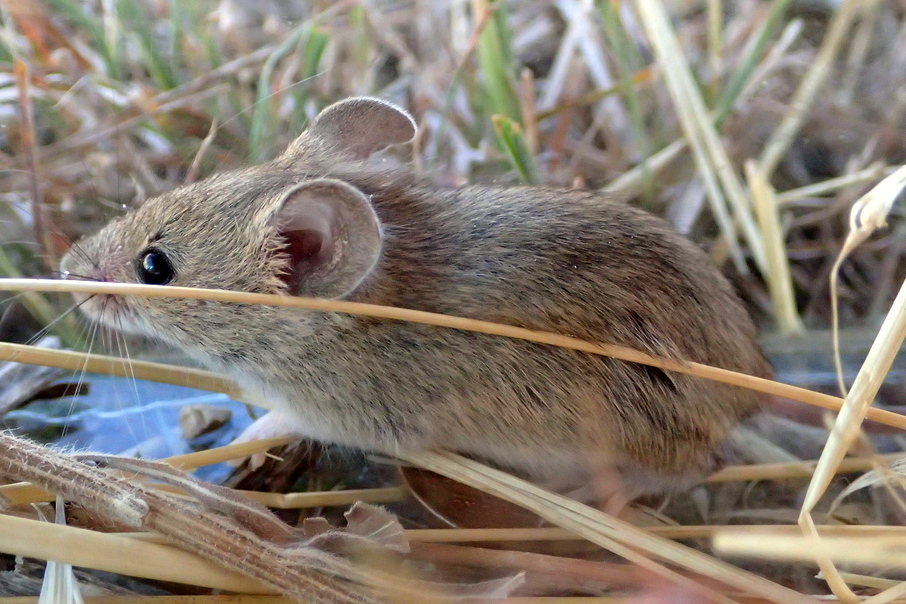

Conservation status
- Least Concern (IUCN 3.1)

Scientific classification
- Kingdom: Animalia
- Phylum: Chordata
- Class: Mammalia
- Order: Rodentia
- Family: Muridae
- Genus: Mus
- Subgenus: Mus
- Species: M. spretus

Binomial name
- Mus spretus Lataste, 1883

Subspecies
- Mus spretus spretus; Mus spretus parvus
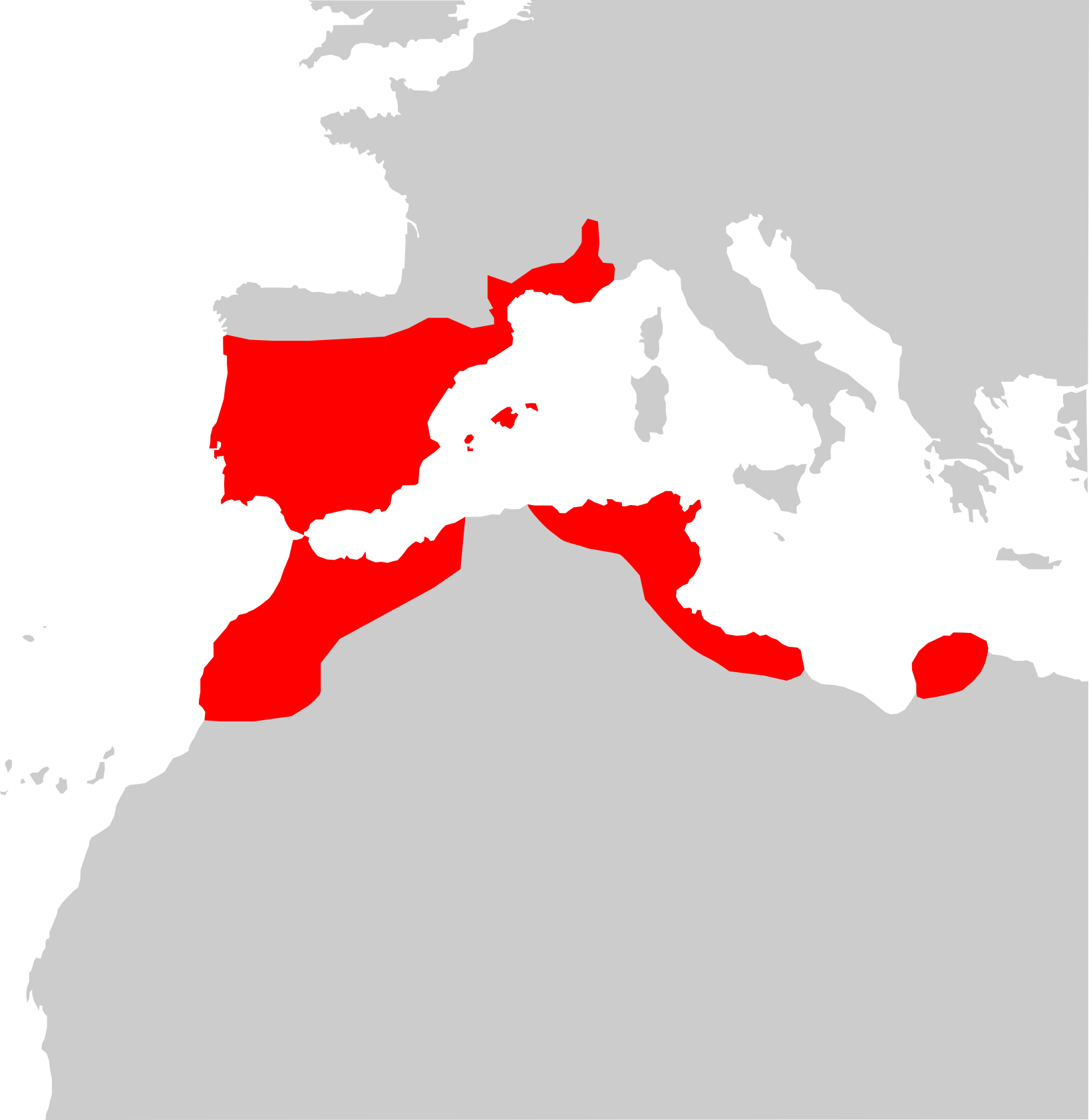
- Distribution range map of Mus spetrus

Synonyms
- Mus spicilegus spretus

= Algerian mouse =

Species of rodent

The Algerian mouse (Mus spretus), also known as the western Mediterranean mouse, is a wild species of mouse closely related to the house mouse, native to open habitats around the western Mediterranean.

== Description ==
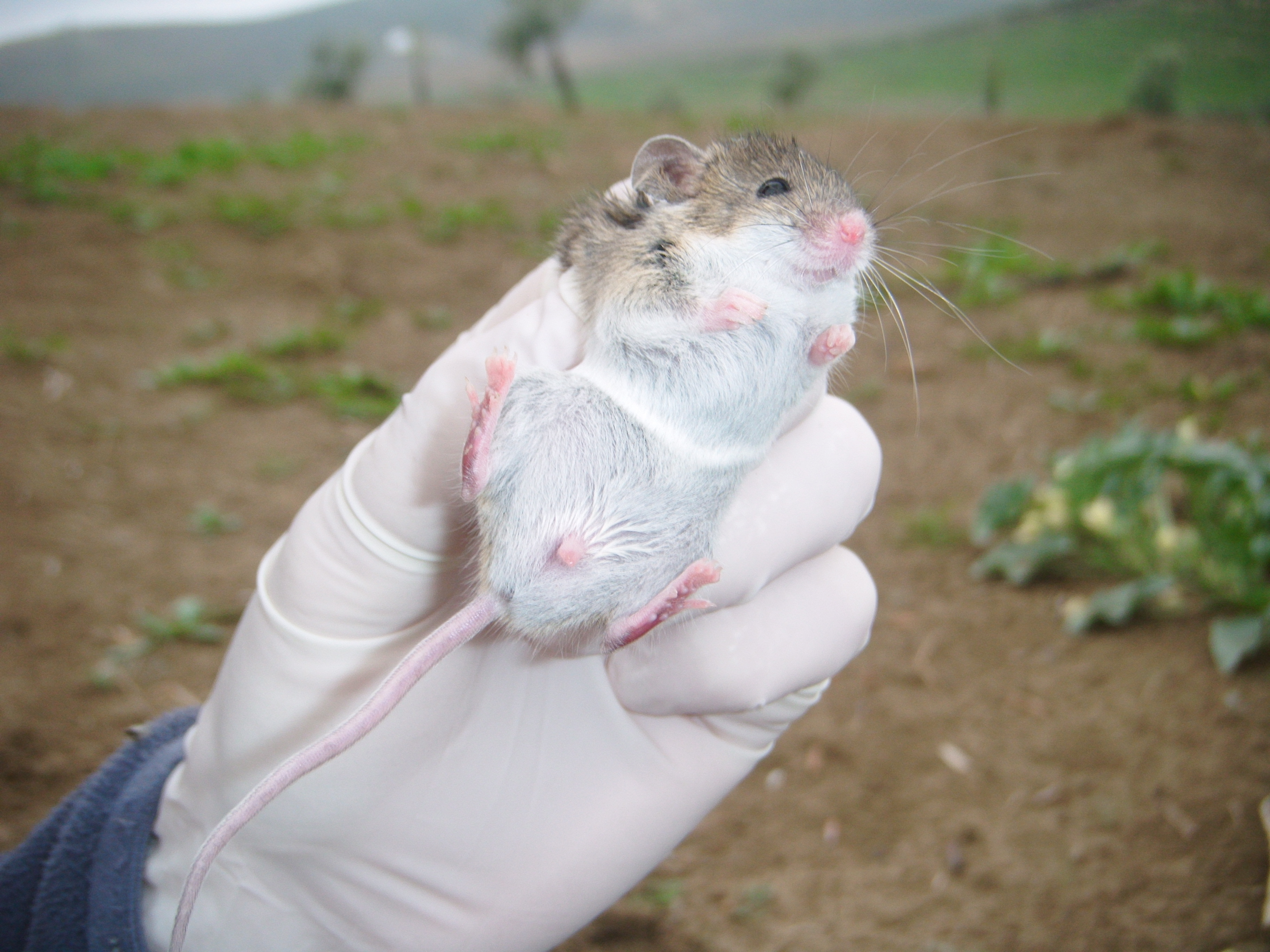
Algerian mouse, showing the paler underparts

The Algerian mouse closely resembles the house mouse in appearance, and can be most easily distinguished from that species by its shorter tail. It has brownish fur over most of the body, with distinct white or buff underparts. It ranges from 7.9 to 9.3 cm (3.1 to 3.7 in) in head-body length with a 5.9 to 7.3 cm (2.3 to 2.9 in) tail and a body weight of 15 to 19 g (0.53 to 0.67 oz).

== Distribution and habitat ==
The Algerian mouse inhabits south-western Europe and the western Mediterranean coast of Africa. It is found throughout mainland Portugal, and in all but the most northerly parts of Spain. Its range extends east of the Pyrenees into southern France, where it is found in south-eastern regions around Toulouse and up the Rhone valley to Valence. It is also found throughout the Balearic Islands. In Africa, it is found in the Maghreb regions of Morocco, Algeria, Tunisia, and western Libya, north of the Sahara desert. Also, a small population occurs on the coast of eastern Libya.

It prefers open terrain, avoiding dense forests, and is most commonly found in temperate grassland, arable land, and rural gardens. It can typically be found in areas of grassland or open scrub, where shrubs and tall grasses can help obscure it from predators, but where plenty of open ground is available. Although it is considered a fully wild species, avoiding humans, it may occasionally be found in abandoned buildings.

== Behaviour and ecology ==
=== Habits, diet, predators ===
The Algerian mouse is primarily nocturnal. It is an opportunistic omnivore, primarily feeding on grass seeds, fruit, and insects. It has been reported to require only two-thirds the volume of drinking water required by the house mouse. As a relatively unspecialized small mammal, it is preyed on by a number of predators, including owls, mammalian carnivores, and snakes.

=== Territorial organization and social behavior ===
Male and female adults are frequently captured in the same location, implying a close relationship with their environment. The sedentary nature of older males at the beginning of reproduction suggests territorial organization, although it does not fiercely try to exclude others from its territory. Adult males range across a territory of around 340 m^{2} (3,700 sq ft), which overlaps with the ranges of neighboring females, but not with those of other males. Although they defend at least the core areas of their ranges from other mice, they are less aggressive than the house mouse, establishing dominance through ritual behavior rather than overt violence. Lactating females are more aggressive than other females. Each male territory overlaps with the territory of at least two females. Daily displacements vary depending on the habitat, sex, age, and season. The average ranges from 27.8 to 112 m (91 to 367 ft). Algerian mouse is sympatric with house mouse but usually does not share habitats. Competition between the two species depends on habitat quality, and the Algerian mouse dominates in the driest habitats. The mouse has been reported to clear away their own faeces from areas they regularly inhabit or use, either by picking up the droppings in their mouths or pushing them along the ground with their snouts. This hygienic behaviour is notably different from that of the closely related house mouse.

== Reproduction ==
Algerian mice breed for nine months of the year, but are sexually inactive from November to January. Although they can breed during any other month, they have two breeding seasons during which they are particularly active. In April and May, adults surviving from the previous year produce a new generation of mice, then both they and their new offspring breed during the second peak in August to September. Gestation lasts 19 to 20 days, and results in the birth of two to ten blind and hairless pups, with about five being average.

The young begin to develop fur at two to four days, their ears open at three to five days, and their eyes open at 12 to 14. The young begin to eat solid food as soon as they can see, but are not fully weaned for about three or four weeks, leaving the nest shortly thereafter. They reach the full adult size at eight to nine weeks, by which time they are already sexually mature. They have been reported to live up to 15 months.

Male mice exhibit strong affiliative behavior towards their usual mate, regardless of their reproductive state. There is a socio-spatial link between a single male and a single female, which could imply a social monogamous mating system. Additionally, male and female mice form stable pair bonds that persist throughout the breeding season. These pairs exhibit coordinated behaviors such as nest building and territory defense, indicating a high level of social and behavioral compatibility. The reproductive state of female mice (virgin or paired) seemed unaffected by encounters with male mice.

Algerian mice exhibit a high degree of sexual dimorphism, with males being larger and more aggressive than females. Sexual maturity is reached earlier in females than in males, with females being able to conceive and bear young from the sixth or seventh week of life, while males cannot fertilize a female before the eighth week. The beginning of sexual maturity appears to depend on unique characteristics such as environmental and populational factors. Social interactions between male mice can alter their attraction to the odors of their competitors. Specifically, male mice that had social interactions with an unfamiliar male showed reduced attraction to the odor of the competitor compared to mice that had no social interaction. The change in attraction is due to changes in the receiver's perception of the odor. This perception of competitor's odors in mice could have important implications for mate choice and other social behaviors in this species. For example, the male mouse could have less attraction to a female mouse when she has the odor of a competitor on her.

The Algerian mouse is the only known small mammal species not to show an inverted breeding pattern in European southern populations compared with northern ones. Researchers have explored the mechanism of inverted breeding patterns by testing for differences in spermatogenetic activity between Algerian mice and closely related species. For example, wood mice (Apodemus sylvaticus) breed during Spring/ Autumn when they are in Northern Europe. But in Southern Europe, they breed the whole year, except in the summer. Algerian mice do not show this inversion. The length of the spermatogenic cycle in Algerian mice is currently unknown. Male mice captured during the non-breeding season show normal spermatogenesis and spermiogenesis even though they undergo a reduction in testicular mass and seminiferous tubule diameter. Also, their epididymides contain mature spermatozoa, which indicates they are fully fertile. However, they are likely sexually inactive due to the low levels of serum testosterone and the lack of sexual receptivity of the females. Sexually inactive male Algerian mice maintain almost normal spermatogenic activity and an intact blood-testis barrier despite a significant reduction of androgenic function.

In laboratory conditions, male mice show care for their offspring, including gathering and protecting their young and sharing nests. In field conditions, male mice not only provide care for their offspring but also participate in territorial defense and food provisioning.

== Hybridization ==
Biologist Michael Kohn of Rice University in Houston, Texas and his associate believed that they "caught evolution in the act" while studying mice resistant to warfarin in a German bakery. Genetic study revealed that the supposed house mice, Mus musculus, carried a significant amount of Algerian mouse DNA in their chromosomes and a gene (VKOR, which has been thought to appear first in Mus spretus and perpetuate because it has helped the mice to survive while eating vitamin K-deficient diets) that confers resistance to warfarin. The discovery was believed to have evolutionary importance because this was the first time hybridization had been shown to result in a positive consequence.

== Taxonomy and evolution ==
Five recognised species of the genus Mus are native to Europe. M. musculus is the house mouse, which primarily inhabits human dwellings and other structures, although it may occasionally return to the wild as feral populations. The Algerian mouse is one of the four remaining wild species; although its exact relationship to the house mouse is unclear, it may represent the earliest evolutionary divergence within the group. The remaining European species are the Macedonian mouse, the steppe mouse and the Cypriot mouse.

In any event, it is sufficiently closely related that male house mice can breed with female Algerian to produce viable offspring, although this has only been observed in captivity, and does not appear to occur in the wild, perhaps because the two species inhabit different habitats. Male hybrids of these unions are sterile, but female hybrids are not. In contrast, male Algerian mice do not breed with female house mice, violently driving them away.

The oldest fossils of the species date back 40,000 years, and were found in Morocco. Along with evidence based on modern genetic diversity, this suggests that the species first arose in Africa, and only later migrated north to Europe, perhaps with the expansion of agricultural land into the continent during the Neolithic.

== See also ==
- Interbreeding between archaic and modern humans
