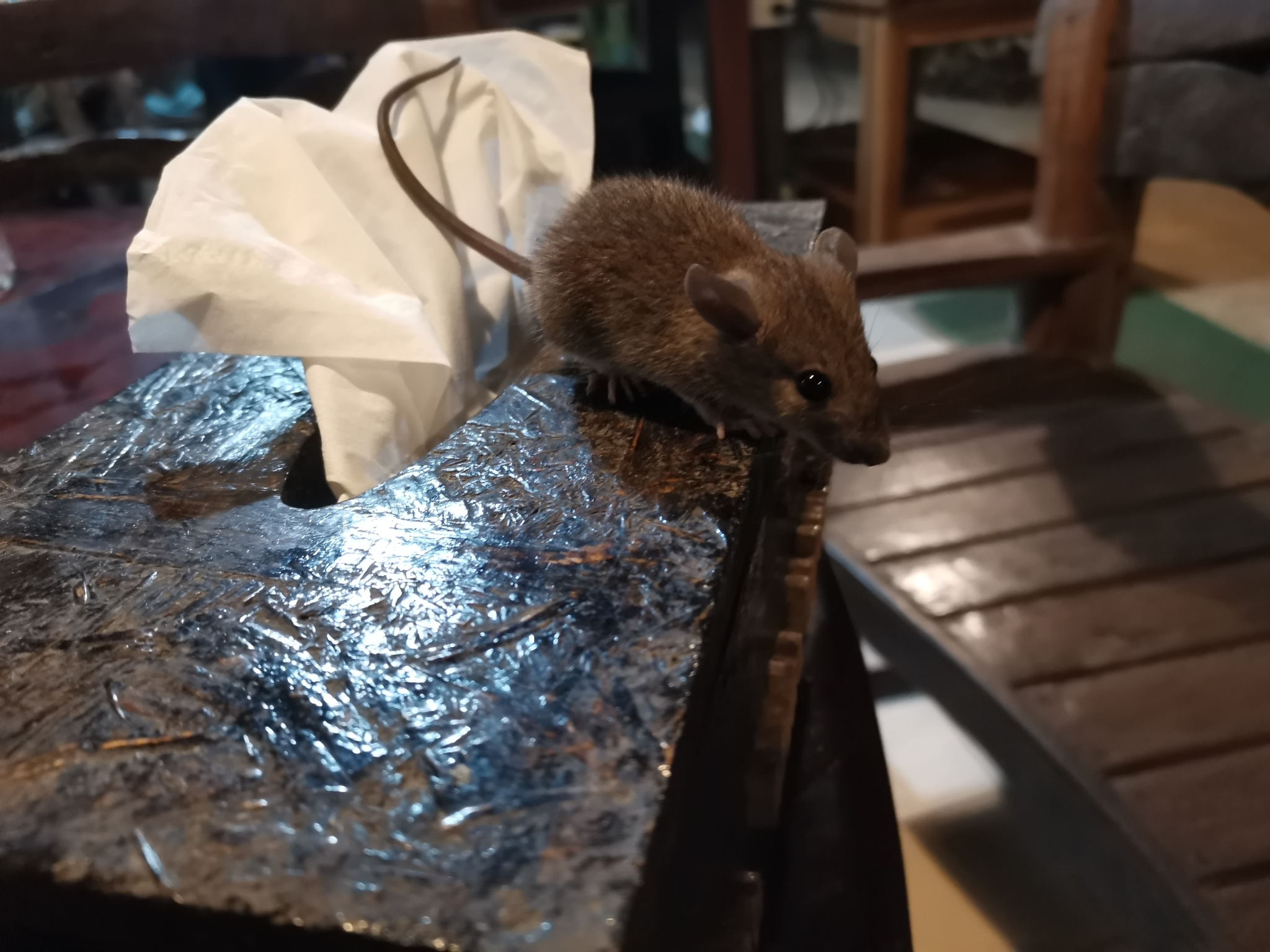

Conservation status
- Least Concern (IUCN 3.1)

Scientific classification
- Kingdom: Animalia
- Phylum: Chordata
- Class: Mammalia
- Infraclass: Placentalia
- Order: Rodentia
- Family: Muridae
- Genus: Mus
- Subgenus: Mus
- Species: M. caroli

Binomial name
- Mus caroli Bonhote, 1902
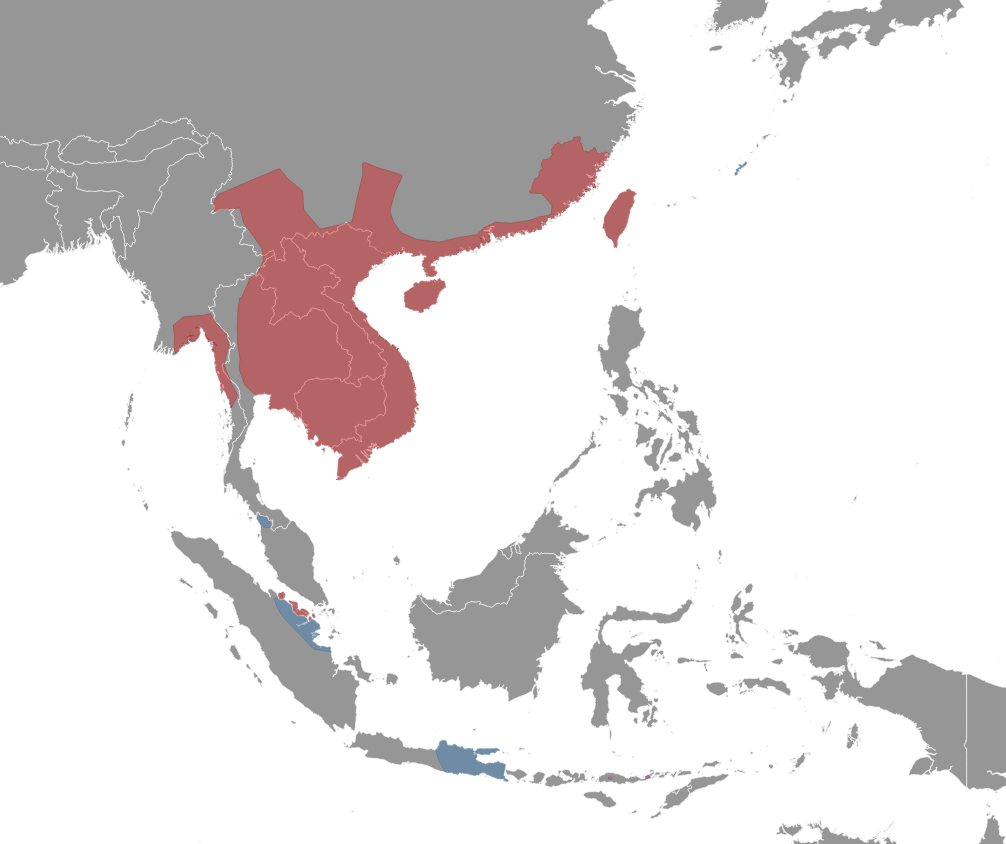

= Ryukyu mouse =

Species of rodent

The Ryukyu mouse (Mus caroli) is a species of rodent in the family Muridae. It is found in Cambodia, China, Indonesia, Japan, Laos, Malaysia, Taiwan, Thailand, and Vietnam.
