= Earth-colored mouse =

Conservation status
- Least Concern (IUCN 3.1)

Scientific classification
- Kingdom: Animalia
- Phylum: Chordata
- Class: Mammalia
- Infraclass: Placentalia
- Order: Rodentia
- Family: Muridae
- Genus: Mus
- Subgenus: Mus
- Species: M. terricolor

Binomial name
- Mus terricolor Blyth, 1851

Synonyms
- Mus dunni

Species of rodent

The earth-colored mouse (Mus terricolor) is a species of rodent in the family Muridae. It is found in India, possibly Indonesia, Nepal, and Pakistan. The earth-colored mouse lives in cultivated fields in raised moist mounds of Earth, where they burrow and locate their nest about 20 cm or 8 inches deep. Living in a raised mound of soil offers them more oxygen flow from air coming through the surrounding sides as well as from above. In contrast, their co-existing sibling species Mus booduga burrow in the flat parts of the field, which allows for niche differentiation.
