= Sheath-tailed mouse =

Conservation status
- Least Concern (IUCN 3.1)

Scientific classification
- Kingdom: Animalia
- Phylum: Chordata
- Class: Mammalia
- Infraclass: Placentalia
- Order: Rodentia
- Family: Muridae
- Genus: Mus
- Subgenus: Mus
- Species: M. fragilicauda

Binomial name
- Mus fragilicauda Auffray et al. 2003
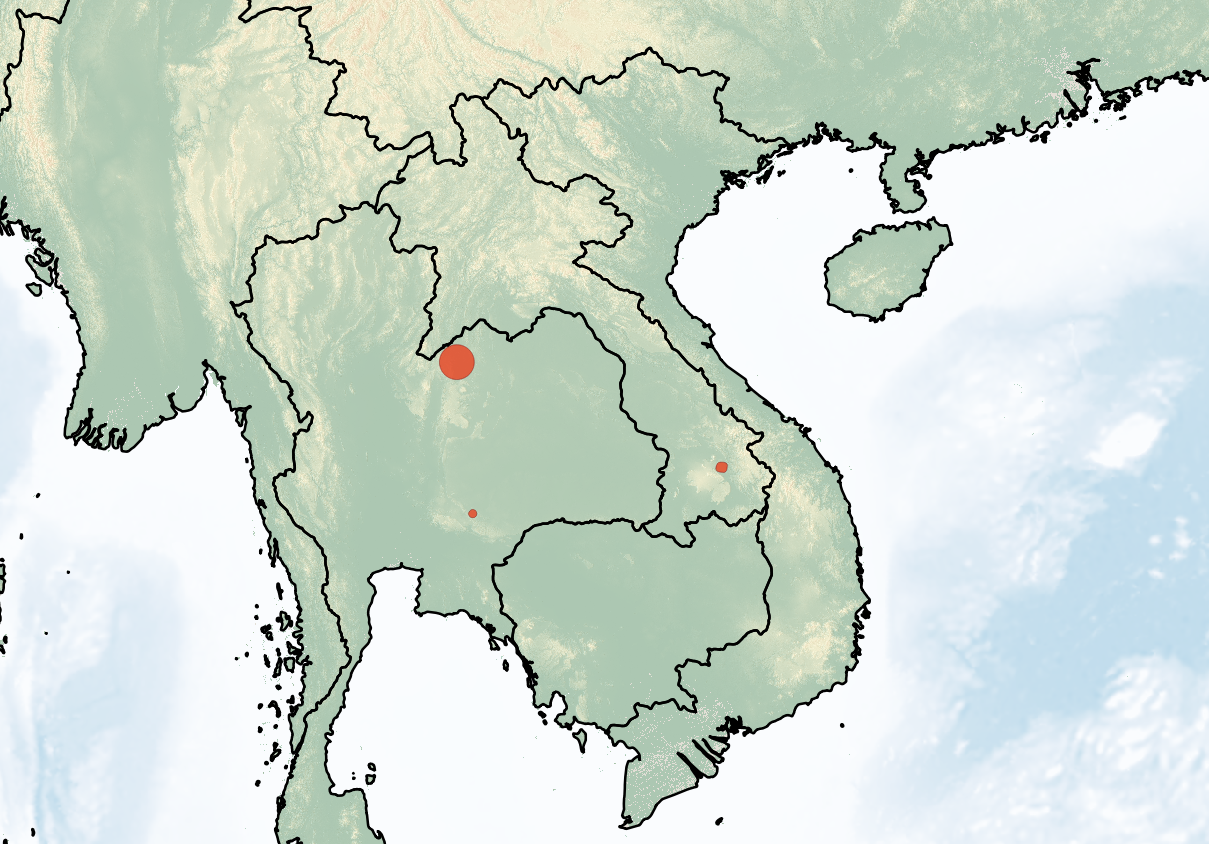

Species of rodent

The sheath-tailed mouse (Mus fragilicauda) is a mouse found in two locations in central Thailand and in Laos. They were discovered and documented in 2002. It is the only known Mus species to lose its tail integument when handled. It is sometimes found with the fawn-colored mouse.

== Range ==
In Nakhon Ratchasima Province, Thailand, Mus fragilicauda has been recorded in Ban Nong Sanga and Tumbon. It has also been recorded in Loei, Thailand and in Lamam, Sekong Province, Laos.
