= Servant mouse =

Conservation status
- Endangered (IUCN 3.1)

Scientific classification
- Kingdom: Animalia
- Phylum: Chordata
- Class: Mammalia
- Infraclass: Placentalia
- Order: Rodentia
- Family: Muridae
- Genus: Mus
- Subgenus: Mus
- Species: M. famulus

Binomial name
- Mus famulus Bonhote, 1898

Species of rodent

The servant mouse (Mus famulus) or Bonhote's mouse, is a species of rodent in the family Muridae. It is found only in the Western Ghats of South India, where it is restricted to Eravikulam National Park, Avalanche, Kalapatti, and Coonoor.

== Habitat and ecology ==
The servant mouse is a nocturnal terrestrial rodent. Its natural habitats are subtropical or tropical dry forests and subtropical or tropical dry lowland grassland. It is typically observed in the area having elevation in the range of 1,540–2,400 m (5,050–7,870 ft).

== Conservation status ==
The servant mouse has been classified as on the IUCN Red List as Endangered since 1996 primarily because of wide spread habitat destruction. The current habitable area is estimated to be less than 500 km^{2} (190 sq mi), which is thought to be declining in extent and quality. It has been listed in the schedule V of the Indian Wildlife Protection Act. 1972 amended in 2002.
