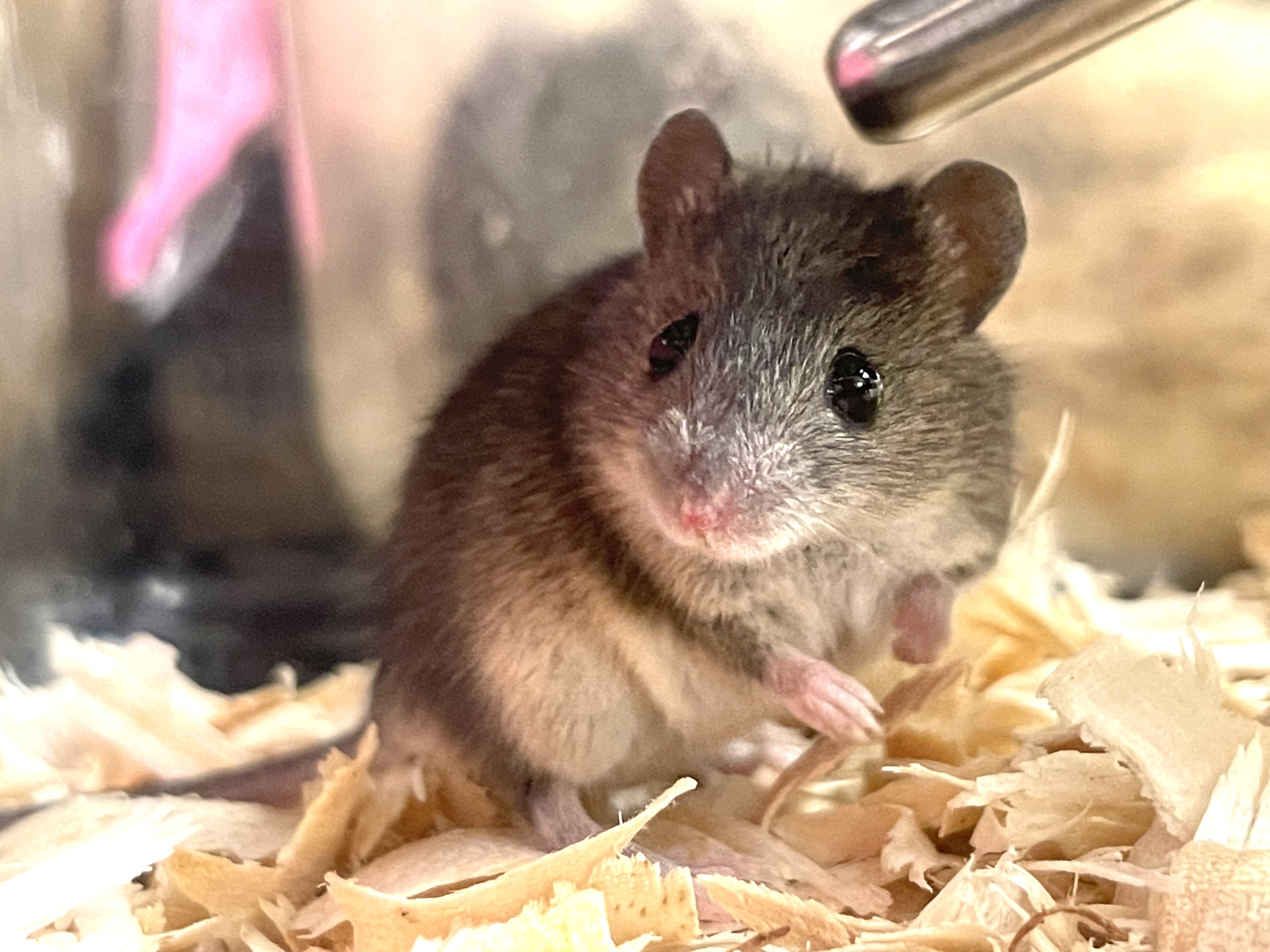

Conservation status
- Least Concern (IUCN 3.1)

Scientific classification
- Kingdom: Animalia
- Phylum: Chordata
- Class: Mammalia
- Infraclass: Placentalia
- Order: Rodentia
- Family: Muridae
- Genus: Mus
- Subgenus: Mus
- Species: M. spicilegus

Binomial name
- Mus spicilegus Petényi, 1882
- Range of M. spicilegus Extant, resident

= Steppe mouse =

Species of rodent

The steppe mouse or mound-building mouse (Mus spicilegus) is a species of rodent in the family Muridae. It is found in grassland and other open areas in Austria, Bosnia and Herzegovina, Albania, Bulgaria, Croatia, Greece, Hungary, Moldova, Romania, Russia, Serbia, Montenegro, North Macedonia, Slovakia, and Ukraine.

== Taxonomy ==
Mus spicilegus ranges from Austria to Southern Ukraine and Greece. Two subspecies are recognised, M. s. spicilegus, the nominate subspecies occupying most of the range, and M. s. adriaticus, an isolated sub-population on the Adriatic coast. It is one of four species of mice in the Mus subgenus with a western Palearctic distribution, the others being the Macedonian mouse (Mus macedonicus) (Balkans to Israel/Palestine and Iran), the Algerian mouse (Mus spretus) (Southern France, Iberian Peninsula, Balearic Islands, Morocco to Tunisia) and the Cypriot mouse (Mus cypriacus). Based on the molecular clock hypothesis, M. spicilegus and M. macedonicus seem to have diverged quite recently, between 0.29 and 0.17 mya, whereas the lineages giving rise to these and M. spretus diverged around 1 mya.

== Description ==
The head-and-body length is between 70 and 80 mm (2.76 and 3.15 in) and the tail is between 55 and 65 mm (2.17 and 2.56 in) long. The colour is mostly a uniform grey with no hint of redness, but some populations are bicoloured and have paler underparts. The tail is more slender than that of other related species. This mouse is very similar in appearance to the common house mouse (Mus musculus), and the two are often confused. The most significant difference is the mound-building proclivities of Mus spicilegus, but these are only apparent at certain times of year.

== Ecology ==
This species is found in grassland, steppe, cultivated land, orchards, clearings and woodland borders. It is unique among mice in its habit of building mounds in the autumn. These are constructed by a number of mice and can be up to 4 m (13 ft) in diameter, although a more normal size is 1 to 2 m (3 to 7 ft). Some four to fourteen mice cooperate to build the mounds, and these have been shown to be closely related, probably through the mother's line. The mound is built over storage chambers which can hold up to 10 kg (22 lb) of seeds and grains, underneath which is a nesting chamber. Up to twenty mounds per hectare (eight per acre) is typical but there can be many more than this under particularly favourable conditions.

Breeding is seasonal in this mouse, taking place between about March and October. Young females, six to eight months old which have spent the winter in the mound, breed in the spring and may have four or five litters of young during the year; in central Ukraine, the litter size averages 6.7 young. During the summer, most animals live in simple burrows, but some continue to inhabit the mound, and if it survives intact, it may be reused in the autumn for winter quarters. New mounds are constructed between about mid-August and mid-November, when cereal crops are maturing and other plants producing seeds. The construction is done by juveniles, three to four weeks old, and the mound is their winter home, with adults occasionally cohabiting. The mounds usually take two or three weeks to construct, and their size is dependent on the number of animals involved and the abundance of the food supply. The seeds of 84 species of plants have been found stored in the mound.

== Status ==
The steppe mouse is a common species with a wide range, and the International Union for Conservation of Nature has rated its conservation status as being of "least concern" while noting that the intensification of agriculture and destruction of grassy steppe may be a future threat.
