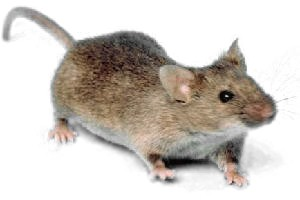
- House mouse (Mus musculus)

Scientific classification
- Kingdom: Animalia
- Phylum: Chordata
- Class: Mammalia
- Order: Rodentia
- Family: Muridae
- Genus: Mus
- Subgenus: Mus; Linnaeus, 1758

Type species
- Mus musculus Linnaeus, 1758

= Mus (Mus) =

Subgenus of rodents

Mus is a subgenus of the rodent genus Mus.

== Species ==
- Little Indian field mouse, Mus booduga (Pakistan, India, Sri Lanka, Bangladesh, southern Nepal, central Myanmar)
- Ryukyu mouse, Mus caroli (Ryukyu islands, Taiwan and southern China to Thailand; introduced in Malaysia and western Indonesia)
- Fawn-colored mouse, Mus cervicolor (Northern India to Vietnam; introduced to Sumatra and Java)
- Cook's mouse, Mus cookii (Southern and northeastern India and Nepal to Vietnam)
- Cypriot mouse, Mus cypriacus (Cyprus)
- Servant mouse, Mus famulus (Southwestern India)
- Sheath-tailed mouse, Mus fragilicauda (Thailand and Laos)
- Macedonian mouse, Mus macedonicus (Balkans to Israel and Iran)
- House mouse, Mus musculus (introduced worldwide)
- Mus nitidulus (Central Myanmar)
- Steppe mouse, Mus spicilegus (Austria to southern Ukraine and Greece)
- Algerian mouse, Mus spretus (Southern France, Iberian Peninsula, Balearic Islands, Morocco to Tunisia)
- Earth-colored mouse, Mus terricolor (India, Nepal, Bangladesh, Pakistan; introduced to Sumatra)

== Phylogeny ==
The following phylogeny of Mus is from Barbara Lundrigan and colleagues' 2002 paper in Systematic Biology.

- Mus
  - Coelomys
  - - Nannomys
    - - Pyromys
      - Mus (subgenus)
        - - Mus caroli
          - - Mus cookii
            - Mus cervicolor
        - - Mus spretus
          - - - Mus spicilegus
              - Mus macedonicus
            - Mus musculus
              - Mus musculus domesticus
              - - Mus musculus castaneus
                - - Mus musculus molossinus
                  - Mus musculus musculus
