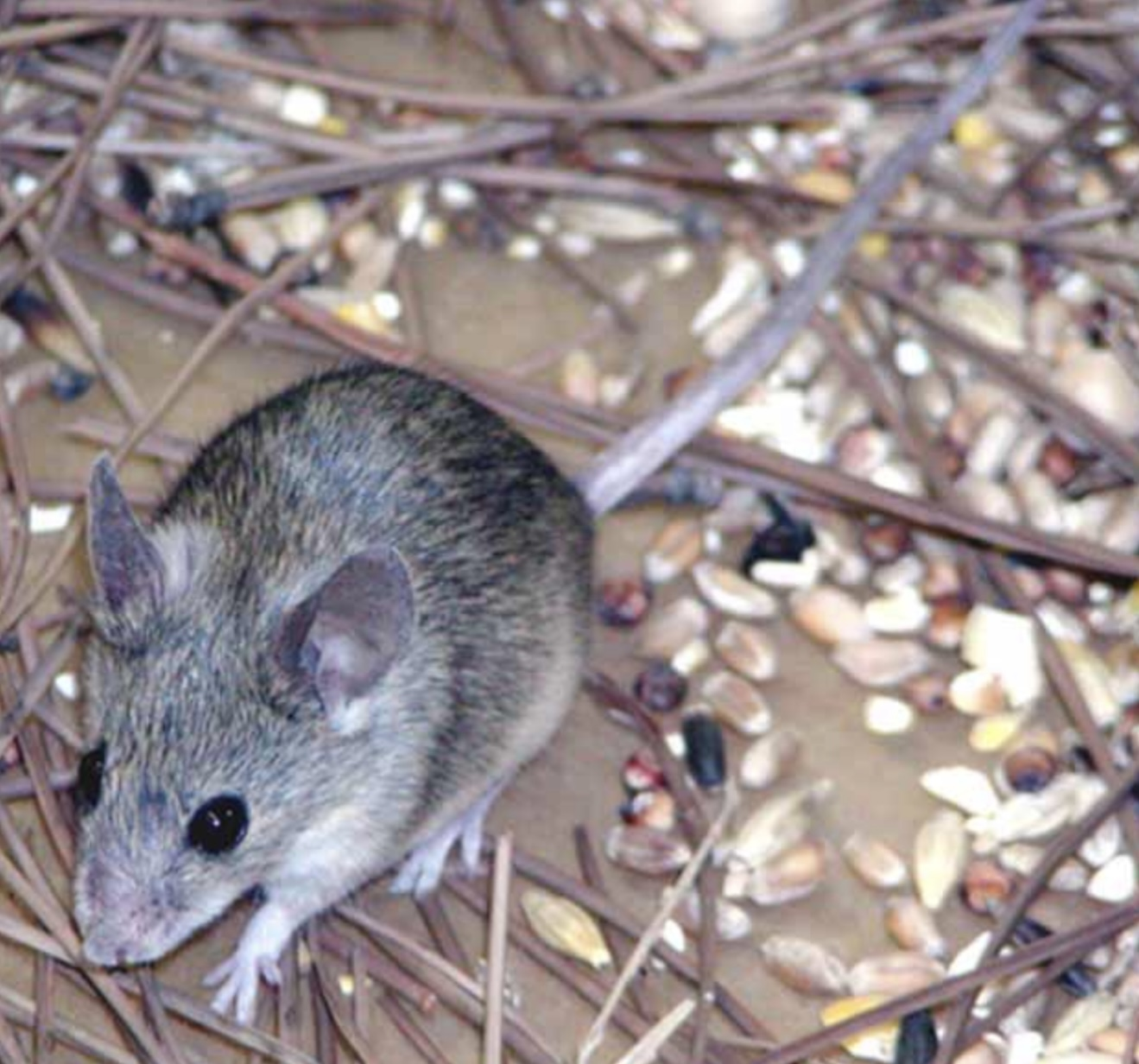

Conservation status
- Least Concern (IUCN 3.1)

Scientific classification
- Kingdom: Animalia
- Phylum: Chordata
- Class: Mammalia
- Order: Rodentia
- Family: Muridae
- Genus: Mus
- Subgenus: Mus
- Species: M. cypriacus

Binomial name
- Mus cypriacus Cucchi et al., 2006

= Cypriot mouse =

Species of rodent

The Cypriot mouse (Mus cypriacus) is a species of mouse that is endemic to Cyprus. Its primary habitat seems to be the vineyards and fields of the Troödos Mountains region.

== Taxonomy ==
The mouse was recognized as a new species in 2004 by Thomas Cucchi, a research fellow at the Durham University. It was formally described in 2006, in the journal Zootaxa.

The Cypriot mouse has characteristics that distinguish it from other European mice: bigger ears, eyes and teeth; DNA tests confirmed that it was a distinct species. Its closest relative is Mus macedonicus, native to southeastern Europe through the Levant.

"All other endemic mammals of Mediterranean islands died out following the arrival of man, with the exception of two species of shrew. The new mouse of Cyprus is the only endemic rodent still alive, and as such can be considered as a living fossil," said Cucchi. It is the only endemic species of terrestrial mammal that was present on Cyprus during the Pleistocene to remain extant, with the three other species, the Cyprus dwarf hippopotamus, the Cyprus dwarf elephant, and the Cyprus genet becoming extinct at the end of the Pleistocene around 12-11,000 years ago, following the arrival of humans to the islands.

== Population genetics ==
Genetic analyses of Mus cypriacus, using mitochondrial DNA (mtDNA) and microsatellite markers, revealed no significant population structure across Cyprus, indicating the species maintains high genetic diversity throughout its range. A study conducted in 2024 found that the species demonstrates high haplotype diversity (0.98), comparable to its closely related continental counterparts, Mus macedonicus and Mus spicilegus. This high diversity is somewhat unexpected for an island species, as isolated populations typically have reduced genetic variability. The substantial size of Cyprus (approximately 9,251 km^{2}) likely supports a large population, facilitating the maintenance of this genetic diversity.

Analyses of microsatellite loci also indicated no evidence of recent genetic bottlenecks, reinforcing the impression of a stable population. Bayesian analyses of mitochondrial sequences estimated the divergence between M. cypriacus and M. macedonicus to be around 630,000 years ago, aligning with historical periods when Cyprus was more accessible due to lowered sea levels. This allowed ancestral mice to colonize the island and eventually evolve into the endemic species.

Habitat analyses suggest that M. cypriacus occupies diverse environments across more than 80% of Cyprus, predominantly in agricultural landscapes, semi-natural forests, and areas with some anthropogenic influence. Although currently assessed as Least Concern by the IUCN, ongoing habitat destruction due to urban development and competition with introduced species such as domestic house mice remain potential threats to this genetically diverse rodent.
