= J. Lewis Bonhote =

British ornithologist (1875–1922)

John Lewis James Bonhote
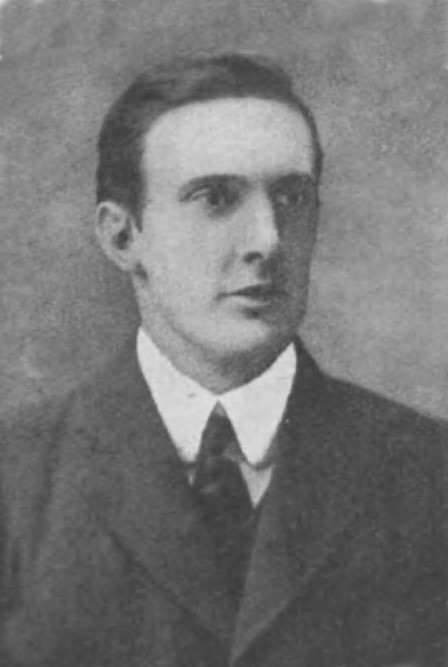
- Born: June 13, 1875
- Died: October 22, 1922
- Other name: J. Lewis Bonhote
- Occupations: zoologist, ornithologist and writer
- Notable work: Birds of Britain (1907)

John Lewis James Bonhote M.A., F.L.S., F.Z.S., M.B.O.U. (13 June 1875 – 10 October 1922) was an English zoologist, ornithologist and writer.

His name is usually stylized as J. Lewis Bonhote (see his list of publications below).

Bonhote was born in London and was educated at Harrow School and Trinity College, Cambridge. He was appointed private secretary to the Governor of the Bahamas in 1897, and was sub-director of the Zoological Gardens at Giza from 1913 to 1919. Bonhote was joint secretary (with Ernst Hartert) of the 4th International Ornithological Congress in London in 1905, secretary and treasurer of the Avicultural Society, secretary of the British Ornithologists' Union (1907–1913) and secretary-treasurer of the British Ornithologists' Club (1920–1922).

Bonhote died in 1922, and was buried on Kensal Green Cemetery.

One species of mammal was named by Bonhote: Bonhote's mouse, also Servant mouse Mus famulus.

One species is named after him (by Oldfield Thomas): Bonhote's gerbil Gerbillus bonhotei, nowadays Anderson's gerbil Gerbillus andersoni.

== Bibliography ==
Among the written publications of Bonhote are:

- Bonhote, J. Lewis (4 December 1900). "On the mammals collected during the 'Skeat expedition' to the Malay peninsula, 1899–1900". Proceedings of the Zoological Society of London. 1900: 869–883. OCLC 665032628 (all editions).
- —— (1906). "On a collection of mammals brought home by the Tibet Frontier Commission". Proceedings of the Zoological Society of London. 1906 (2): 302–308. OCLC 80483266.
- —— (1907). Birds of Britain. illustrated by H.E. Dresser. London: Adam and Charles Black. OCLC 1451688 (all editions).
- —— (1909). "On a Small Collection of Mammals from Egypt". Proceedings of the Zoological Society of London. 79 (4): 788–802. doi:10.1111/j.1469-7998.1910.tb06973.x. OCLC 4644111304.
- —— (1915). Vigour and Heredity. London: West, Newman & Co. OCLC 6383468 (all editions).
- —— (August 1920). "Buff-backed Herons". The Avicultural Magazine. 11 (8): 138–140.
