= Cook's mouse =

Conservation status
- Least Concern (IUCN 3.1)

Scientific classification
- Kingdom: Animalia
- Phylum: Chordata
- Class: Mammalia
- Infraclass: Placentalia
- Order: Rodentia
- Family: Muridae
- Genus: Mus
- Subgenus: Mus
- Species: M. cookii

Binomial name
- Mus cookii Ryley, 1914
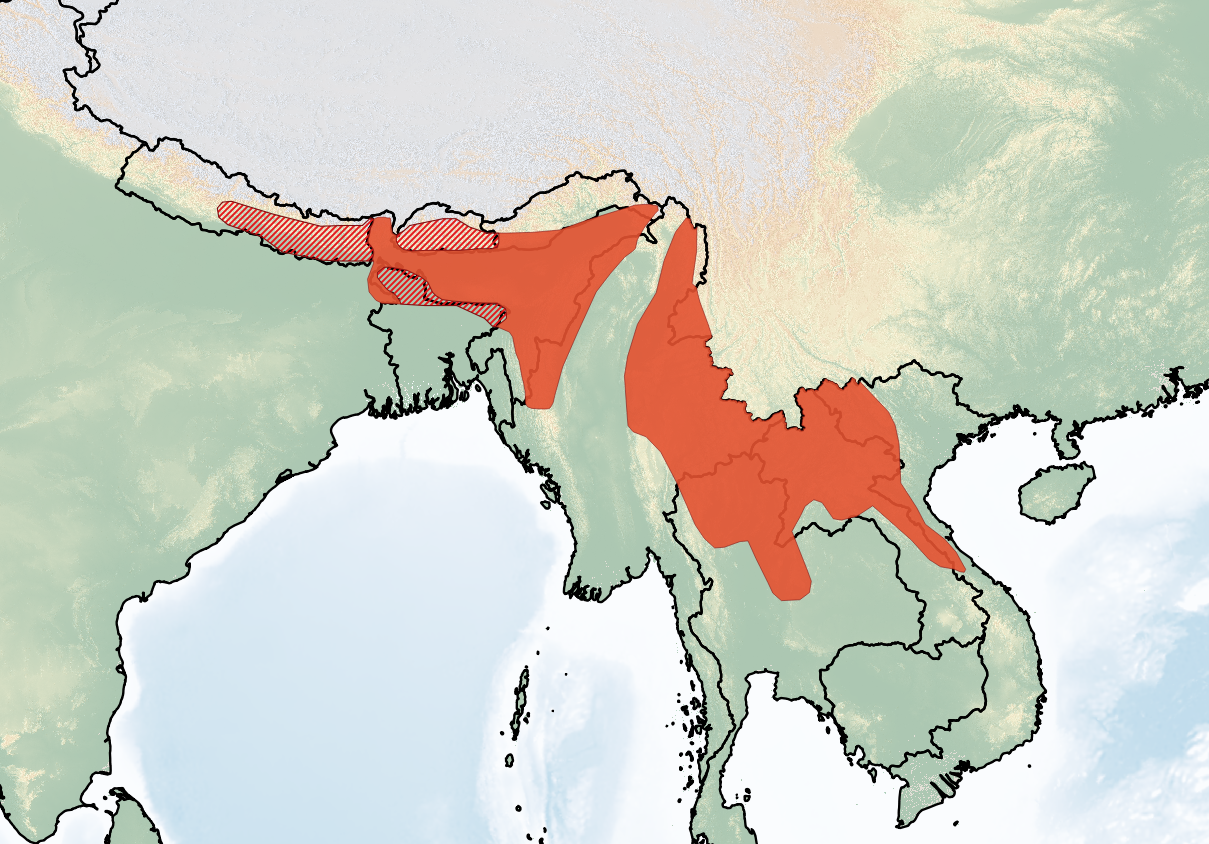

Species of rodent

Cook's mouse (Mus cookii) is a species of rodent in the family Muridae. It is found in southern and south-eastern Asia from India to Vietnam.
