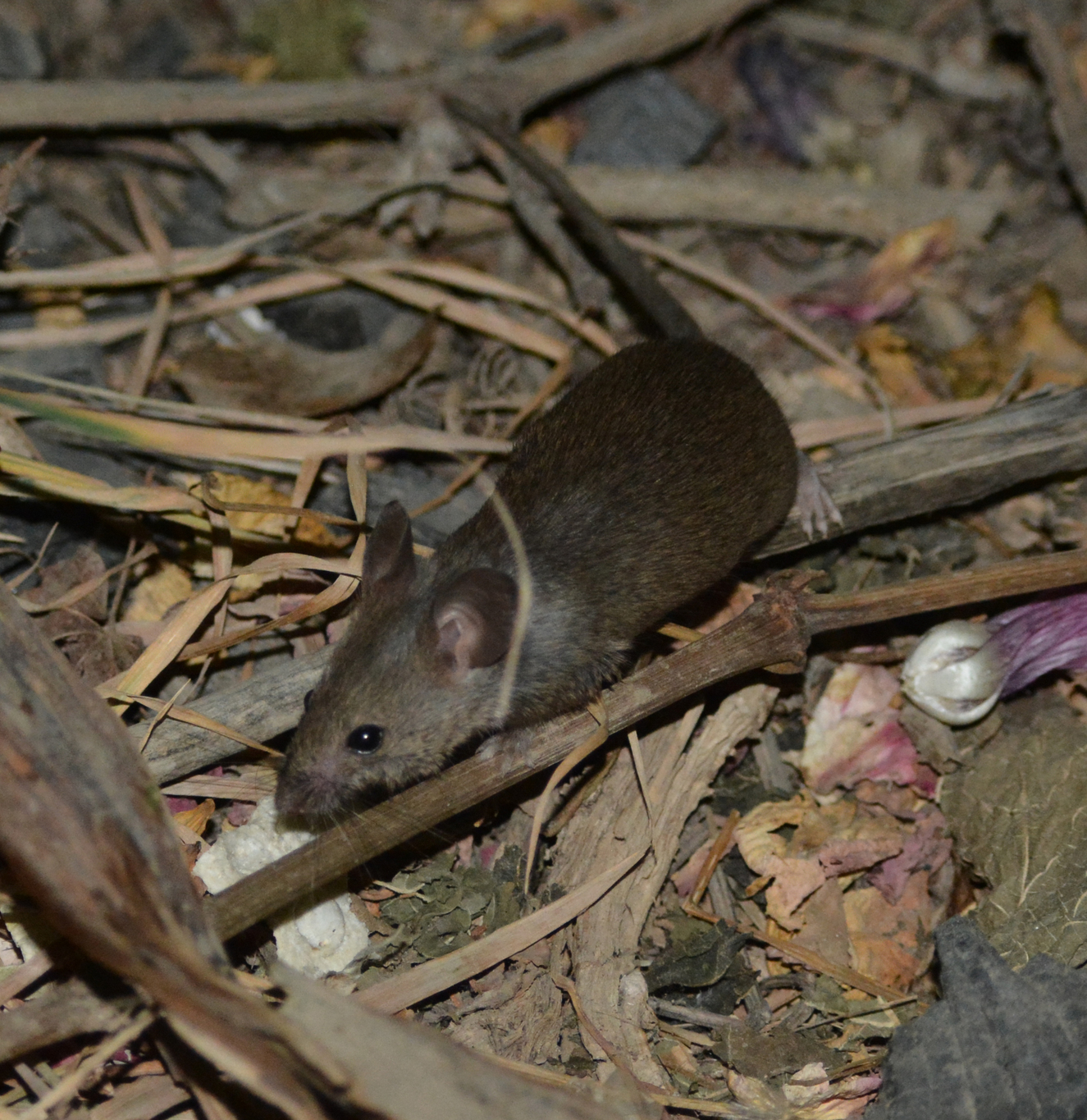

Conservation status
- Least Concern (IUCN 3.1)

Scientific classification
- Kingdom: Animalia
- Phylum: Chordata
- Class: Mammalia
- Infraclass: Placentalia
- Order: Rodentia
- Family: Muridae
- Genus: Mus
- Subgenus: Mus
- Species: M. macedonicus

Binomial name
- Mus macedonicus Petrov & Ruzic, 1983

= Macedonian mouse =

Species of rodent

The Macedonian mouse (Mus macedonicus) is a species of rodent in the family Muridae and order Rodentia. This rodent occurs in the south Balkans, Asia Minor, the Caucasus and the Middle East south to Israel and Jordan and east to Iran. It is considered part of a Palearctic group along with three other species: the house mouse, steppe mouse, and Algerian mouse.

== Description ==
The Macedonian mouse is a small rodent, weighing 15 grams (0.53 oz). Fur color is variable across its range; in a study of numerous specimens in Turkey, Macedonian mice were found to have back colors ranging from dark brown to pale light brown to dark-reddish brown. There is a distinct line of demarcation along the flanks that separates top and bottom coloration. The bottom coloration ranged from whitish grey, pure white, yellowish white, and reddish white. The ears have tiny white hairs. This rodent has a tail that is dark brown on top and lighter on bottom. The bottoms of the Macedonian mouse's feet are bare while the tops of their feet have white hairs. Macedonian mice are nocturnal.

== Morphology ==
The sutura squamalis has distinction from other species because it is smoothed or protrudes slightly forward. The upper portion of the zygomatic arch is also narrower than the lower portion. Macedonian mice found in Israel are smaller than their northern counterparts.

== Physiology ==
Body mass of Macedonian mice exposed to short photoperiods increased - essentially they got bigger to stay warmer when it is cold. The short photoperiods also increased their resistance to cold while long photoperiods increased their ability to manage higher temperatures. Food consumption and waste production are lower in the mice that have longer photoperiods. These physiological changes allow the mice to be well adapted to the changes that occur in the Mediterranean on a seasonal basis. This mouse also shows a genetic tendency for glial fibrillary acidic protein in their lens epithelial cells. This is a new marker of polymorphism in the genus Mus.
