= Chocolate pipistrelle =

Conservation status
- Least Concern (IUCN 3.1)

Scientific classification
- Kingdom: Animalia
- Phylum: Chordata
- Class: Mammalia
- Order: Chiroptera
- Family: Vespertilionidae
- Genus: Hypsugo
- Species: H. affinis

Binomial name
- Hypsugo affinis (Dobson, 1871)
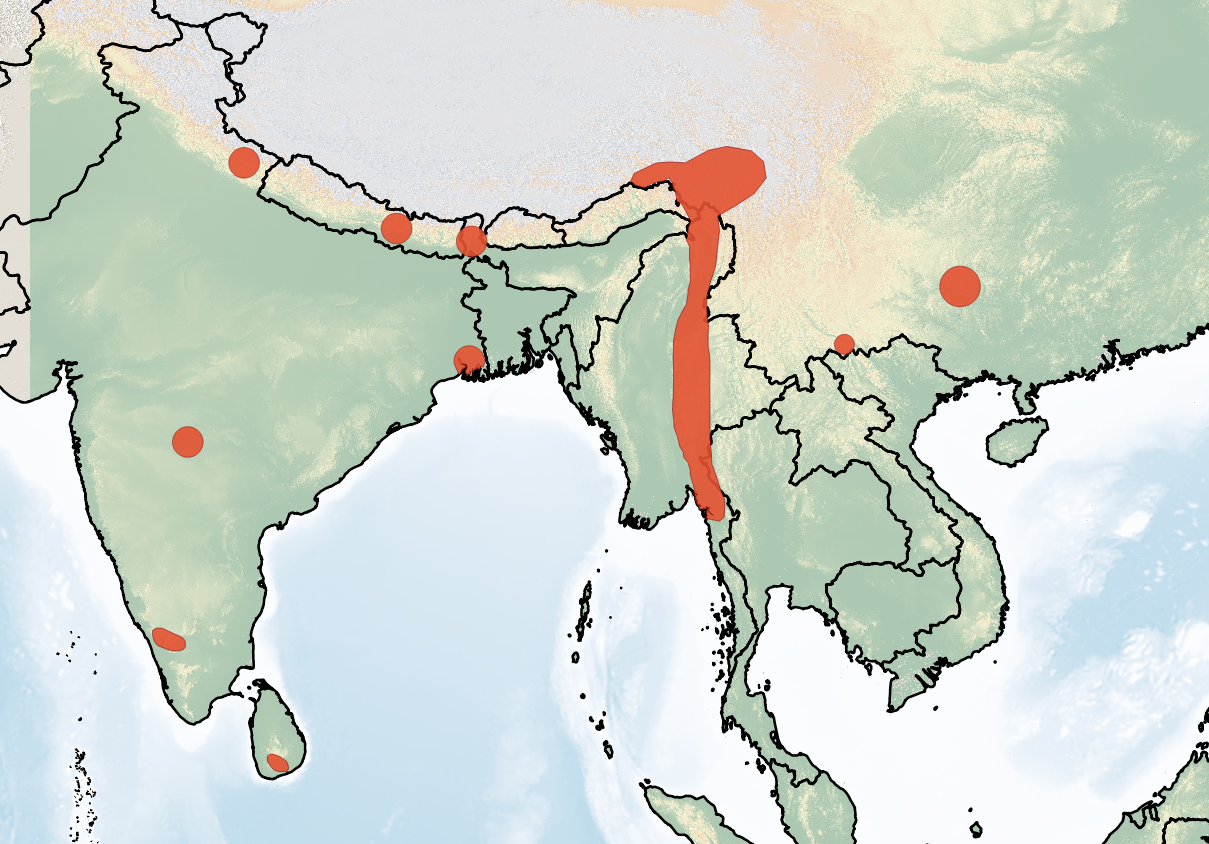

Synonyms
- Pipistrellus affinis (Dobson, 1871); Falsistrellus affinis

Species of bat

The chocolate pipistrelle (Hypsugo affinis) is a species of vesper bat in the family Vespertilionidae. It is found in China, India, Myanmar, Nepal, and Sri Lanka.

Formerly classified in the genus Falsistrellus, phylogenetic evidence supports it belonging to the genus Hypsugo.

== Description ==
Their total head and body length is 9 cm (3.5 in) and their wingspan is 24 cm (9.4 in). Their hair is soft, dense, and relatively long. The dorsum is dark brown, but the extreme tips of the hairs are pale gray, giving a slightly grizzled appearance. The underside is lighter in color. The membrane, ears, and naked parts of the face are uniform blackish brown.
