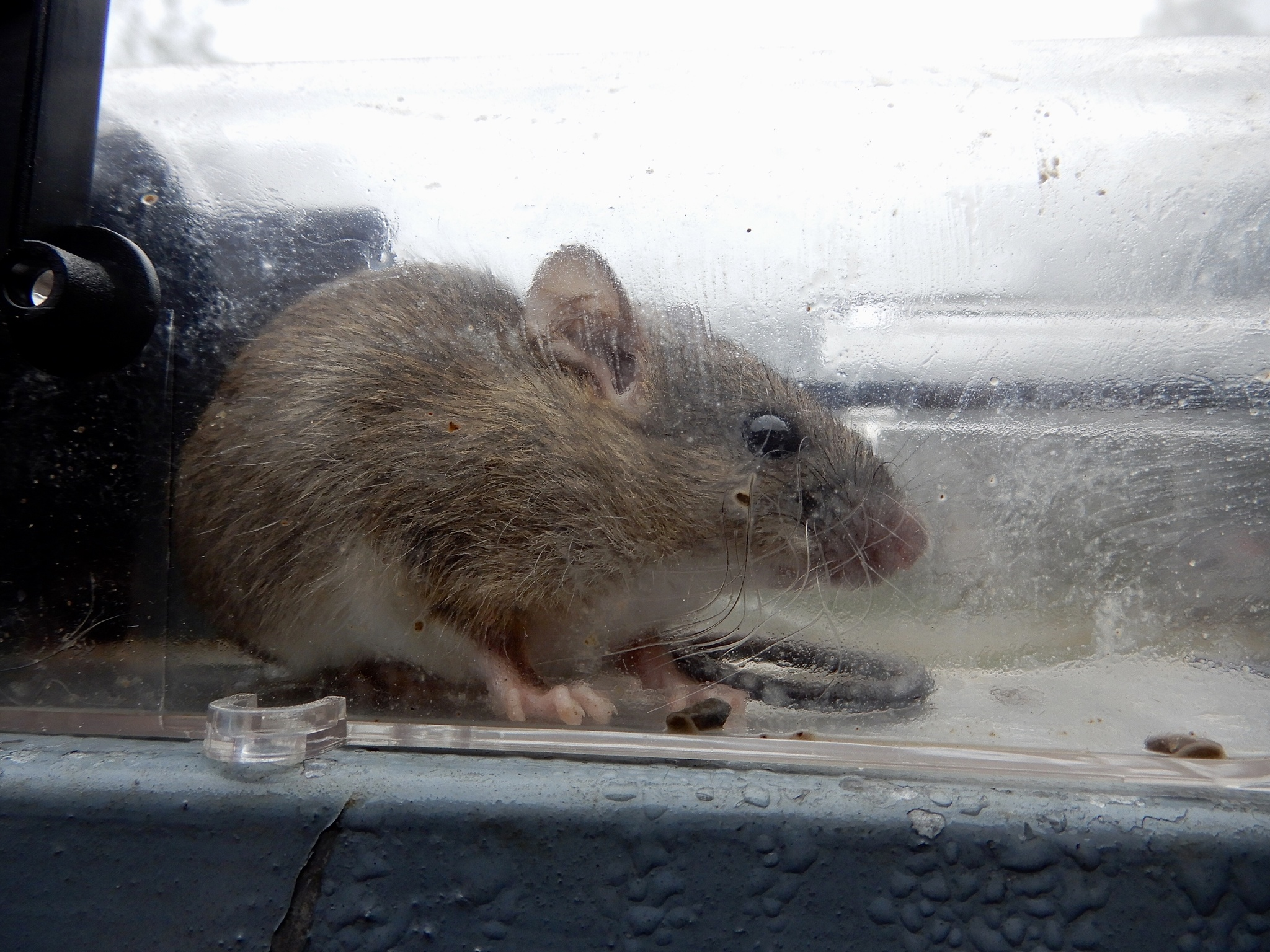

Conservation status
- Least Concern (IUCN 3.1)

Scientific classification
- Kingdom: Animalia
- Phylum: Chordata
- Class: Mammalia
- Order: Rodentia
- Family: Muridae
- Genus: Mus
- Subgenus: Mus
- Species: M. booduga

Binomial name
- Mus booduga (Gray, 1837)
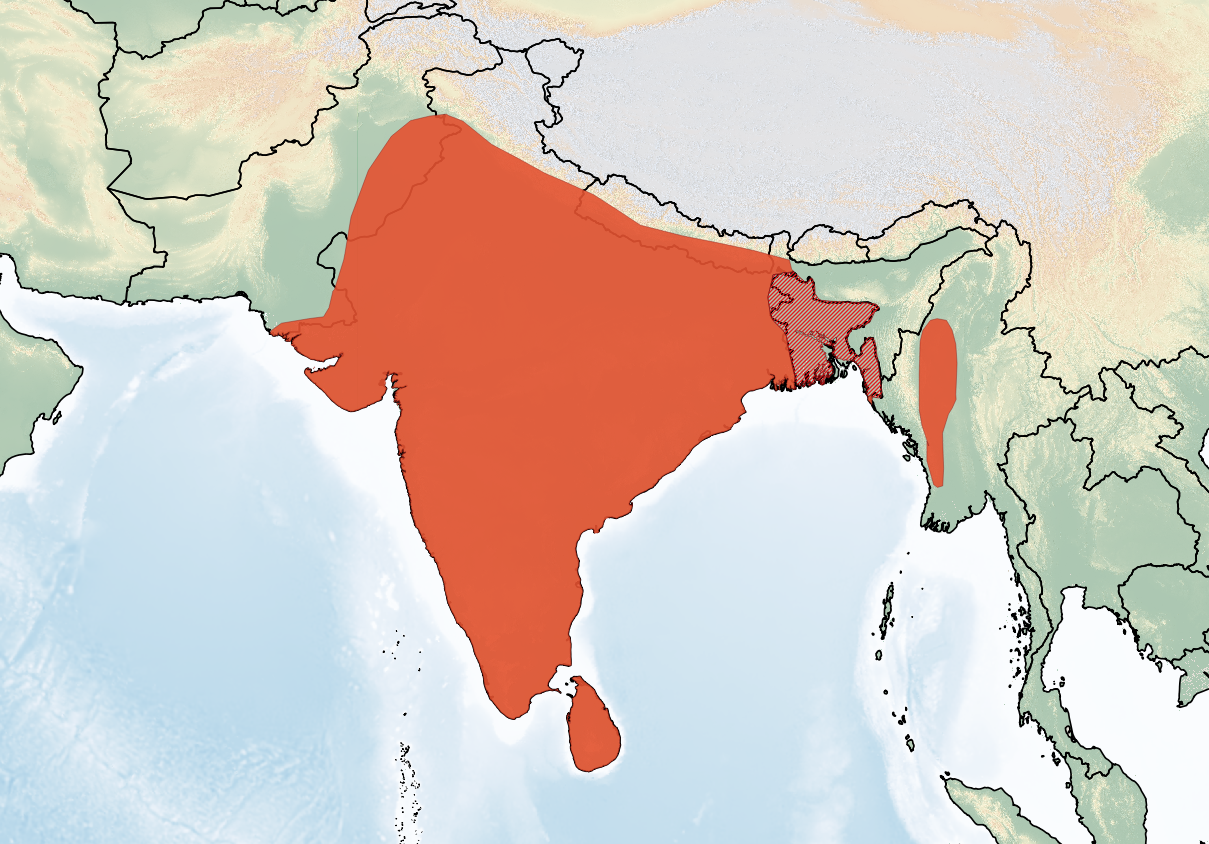

Synonyms
- Leggada booduga Gray, 1837; Leggada lepidoides Fry, 1931; Mus lepidoides (Fry, 1931); Mus albidiventris Blyth, 1852; Mus fulvidiventris Blyth, 1852.

= Little Indian field mouse =

Species of rodent

The little Indian field mouse (Mus booduga) is a species of rodent in the family Muridae. It is found in Bangladesh, India, Myanmar, Nepal, and Sri Lanka. It has been found in multiple locations above 3,500 m above mean sea level, with the highest observation being from 3,768 m.

== Description ==
The species was described first by British biologist John Edward Gray using a specimen collected from Maharashtra. The name "booduga" was derived from a local vernacular name used by early naturalists in southern India.

The head and body length is 7 cm, and the tail is 6 cm. The upper parts of the body are a glossy light brown fading to greyish-white or white on the ventral surface. There is often a light brown band or patch across the chest. Large rounded ears are set on the head. The muzzle is rather pointed. The tail is dark above and paler below. The upper incisors curve backwards.

== Ecology ==
The species is seen in croplands or patches of woodlands at the edge of cultivated fields, but not known to occur in houses. The species is nocturnal and not known to be gregarious.

Burrows of the species in the colder and more strongly seasonal northern India have a greater average depth of 41 cm relative to burrows in the less seasonal south India where they have an average depth of 30 cm. In Rajasthan, the breeding season is September to October and again in February and June, with litter sizes of 6-13. It is, however, known to breed throughout the year in different areas in its distribution range.

Diet is now well known but is known to include vegetables, fruits, tubers, rice and other cultivated grain and insects.

The little Indian field mouse is predated upon by several species of mammals and birds, but is also captured alive and eaten by the ghost crab Ocypode cordimana.

The fur of the little Indian field mouse is naturally flourescent displaying a blue colour (440-480 nm).

In Sri Lanka, the Indian field mouse carries the Lanka Virus, a hantavirus, which it them transmits to humans causing severe febrile illness.

== In culture ==
This animal is known as වෙල් හීන් මීයා (Wel Heen Meeya) by Sinhalese people, which translates to "little field mouse/ rat".
