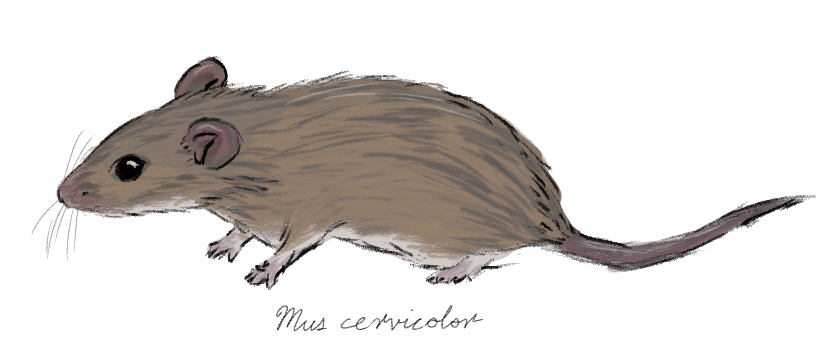

Conservation status
- Least Concern (IUCN 3.1)

Scientific classification
- Kingdom: Animalia
- Phylum: Chordata
- Class: Mammalia
- Infraclass: Placentalia
- Order: Rodentia
- Family: Muridae
- Genus: Mus
- Subgenus: Mus
- Species: M. cervicolor

Binomial name
- Mus cervicolor Hodgson, 1845
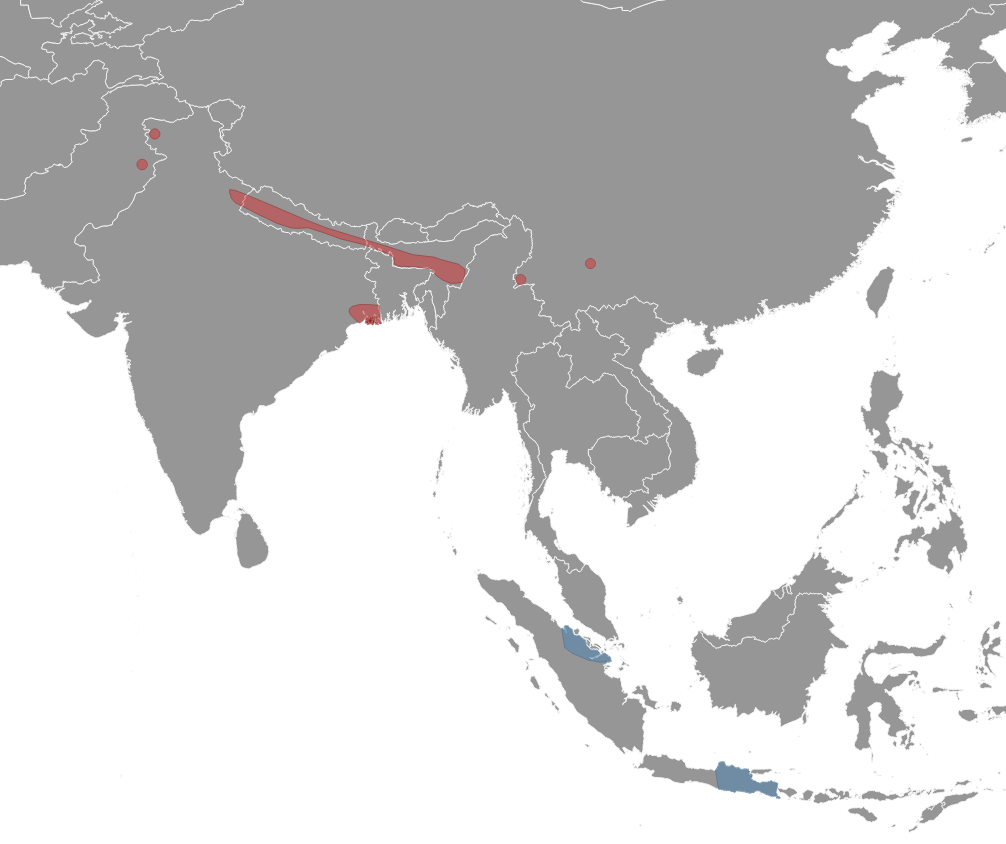

= Fawn-colored mouse =

Species of rodent

The fawn-colored mouse (Mus cervicolor) is a species of rodent in the family Muridae. It is found in Cambodia, India, Indonesia, Laos, Myanmar, Nepal, Thailand, and Vietnam.
