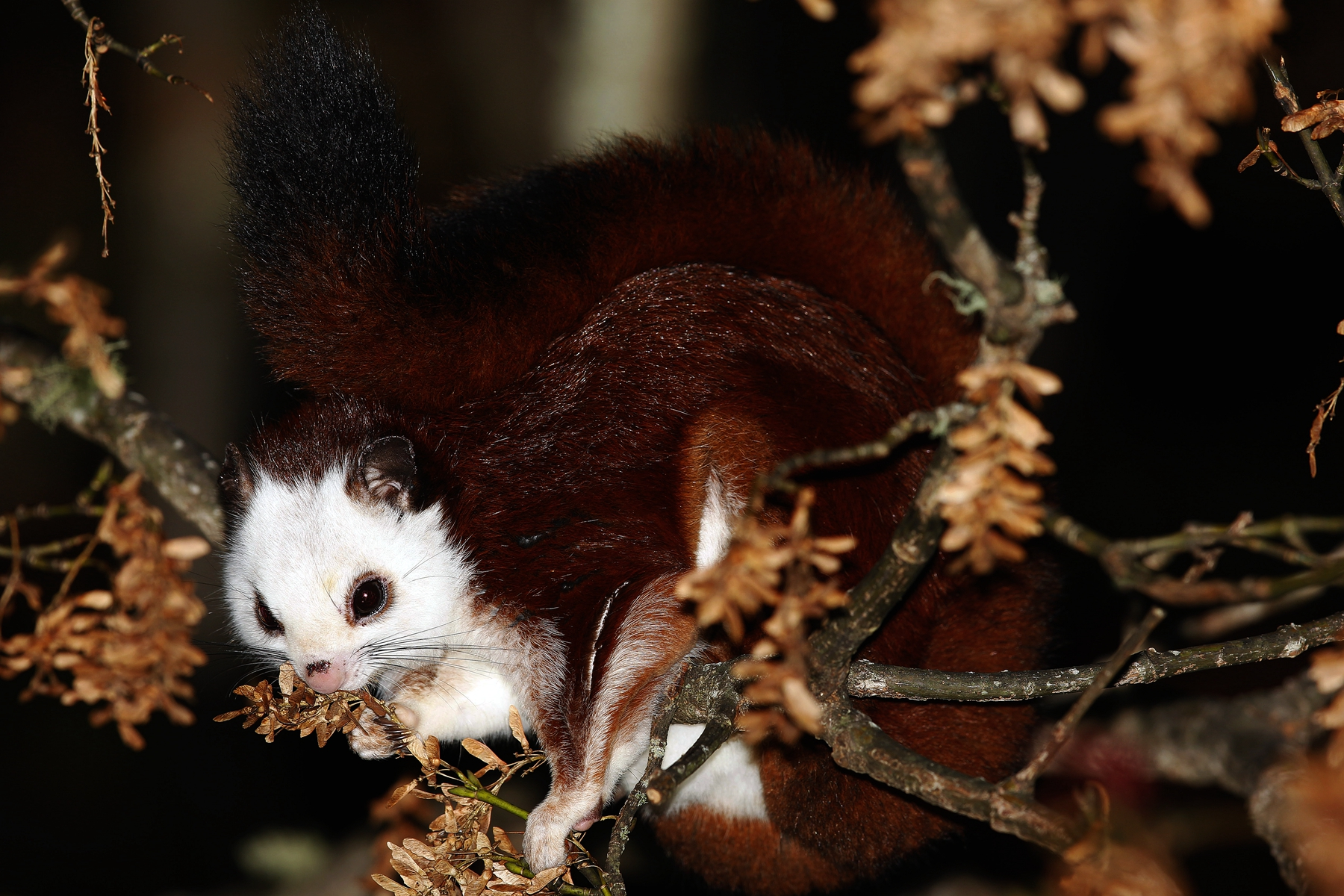
- Petaurista alborufus lena in Taiwan

Conservation status
- Least Concern (IUCN 3.1)

Scientific classification
- Kingdom: Animalia
- Phylum: Chordata
- Class: Mammalia
- Infraclass: Placentalia
- Order: Rodentia
- Family: Sciuridae
- Genus: Petaurista
- Species: P. alborufus

Binomial name
- Petaurista alborufus (A. Milne-Edwards, 1870)
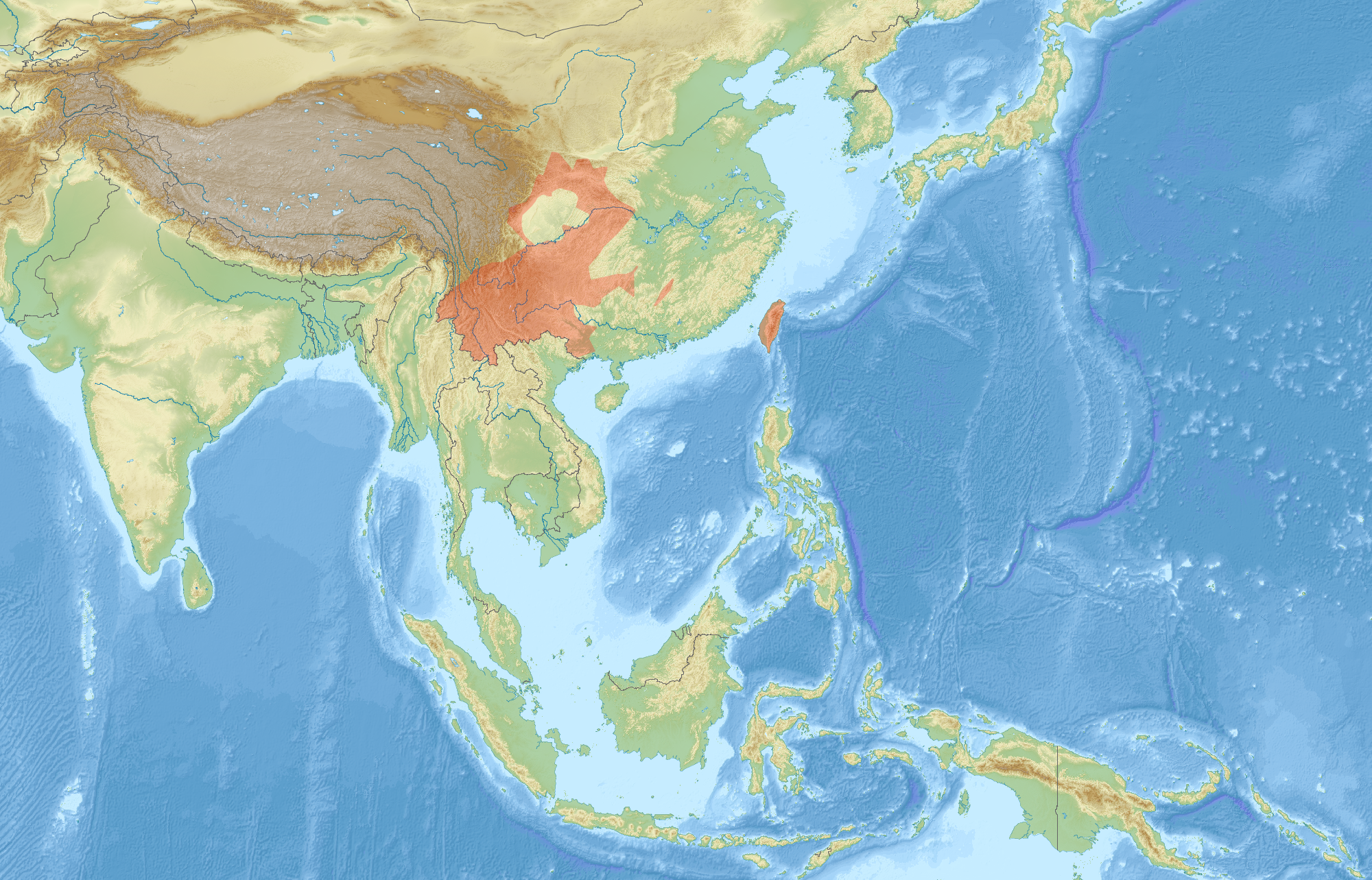
- Range in red

= Red and white giant flying squirrel =

Species of rodent

The red and white giant flying squirrel (Petaurista alborufus) is a species of rodent in the family Sciuridae. It is a very large, dark rufous-red, buff and white flying squirrel found in forests at altitudes of 800–3,500 m (2,600–11,500 ft) in mainland China and 1,200–3,750 m (3,940–12,300 ft) in Taiwan, although the population of the latter island is distinctive and likely better regarded as a separate species, the Taiwan giant flying squirrel (P. lena). Additionally, the red and white giant flying squirrel possibly ranges into northeastern South Asia and far northern Mainland Southeast Asia. This squirrel has a wide range and is relatively common, and the International Union for Conservation of Nature lists it as being of "least concern".

They spend their days sleeping in a tree hollow, emerging at night to forage in the trees. Their diet consists primarily of nuts and fruits, but also includes leafy vegetation, insects and their larvae. Like other flying squirrels, this species can move between trees by gliding (not actually flying like a bat), exceptionally as much as 400 m (1,300 ft). This is achieved by the patagium, skin spread out between its limbs.

== Taxonomy and distribution ==
There are several subspecies of the red and white giant flying squirrel. As traditionally defined, China is inhabited by P. a. alborufus (Gansu, Shaanxi and west Sichuan), P. a. castaneus (Chongqing, Guizhou, Hubei, Hunan, eastern Sichuan, Shaanxi and Yunnan), P. a. leucocephalus (Xizang) and P. a. ochraspis (Guangxi and Yunnan), and Taiwan has P. a. lena. However, records from Gansu, as well as Qinghai, likely are misidentifications of Chinese giant flying squirrels.

The status of the red and white giant flying squirrel in other countries is less clear. One source lists P. a. leucocephalus for northern Myanmar (Burma), and another P. a. ochraspis for northern Myanmar, but the species' presence in this country remains unconfirmed, although it has been confirmed from parts of China that are directly adjacent to northern Myanmar. P. a. leucocephalus has also been listed for Bhutan and Assam, India, but other authorities do not list the species for either country.

The isolated Taiwanese P. a. lena has a distinctive appearance and genetic studies have shown that it is closer to several other giant flying squirrel species than the red and white giant flying squirrel in China. As a consequence, it has been recommended that it should be recognized as a separate species, the Taiwan giant flying squirrel (P. lena). Another subspecies, candidula of Myanmar and northern Thailand, typically is included in the red giant flying squirrel, but it is possibly better included in the red and white giant flying squirrel.

== Appearance ==
The red and white giant flying squirrel has been called the largest flying squirrel, although a few other species match at least some of its dimensions. Its head-and-body length is 35–58 cm (14–23 in) and its tail is 43–61.5 cm (16.9–24.2 in) long. Little data is available on the weight of individuals from China. Although one source specifically lists 1,231 to 1,930 g (2.71–4.25 lb) for the mainland population, this is based on a study of animals from Taiwan. One red and white giant flying squirrel weighed 4,290 g (9.46 lb), by far the highest reported for any gliding mammal, but whether this is normal for the mainland population is unclear. Other flying squirrels with similar maximum head-and-body and total lengths, the Bhutan giant flying squirrel, red giant flying squirrel and woolly flying squirrel, have reported maximum weights between c. 2,500 and 3,200 g (5.5–7.1 lb). Red and white giant flying squirrels from Taiwan, which are smaller than those from China, range from 885 to 1,930 g (1.95–4.25 lb), and average for both sexes is slightly above 1,500 g (3.3 lb).

In China, red and white giant flying squirrels have dark rufous-red upperparts with a large buff or straw-coloured patch on the lower back. The throat and head are white, often with a large rufescent patch around each eye, and the underparts are orange-brown. Depending on mainland subspecies, the feet are blackish or reddish, and the distal two-thirds of the tail can be blackish or russet with an orange-brown or whitish ring at its base. The Taiwanese subspecies has a white head with a narrow or no clear eye-ring, all-dark rufous upperparts and tail (no pale patch on lower back or ring on tail), and all-white underparts.

== Gliding ==
Gliding is accomplished with the help of a parachute-like membrane called a patagium. Before taking off, flying squirrels bob and rotate their heads to gauge the route, and then leap into the air, spreading their patagia between cartilaginous spurs on their wrists and ankles. Small adjustments to these spurs give them some control over their speed and direction. Their flattened tails also aid in steering. As their destination nears, they pull upright, prepare their padded feet to cushion the shock of impact, and ready their sharp claws to grip the bark. Gliding is an efficient way to travel but maneuverability in the air is limited. By keeping nocturnal habits, flying squirrels avoid predation by more skilled fliers, such as hawks and eagles. Owls, however, still pose a threat.

There are 44 species of flying squirrel worldwide. The fact that most of them live in Asia has led to the hypothesis that they originated there. Only two species are found in the Americas: the Northern flying squirrel lives in deciduous and mixed woods all across Canada as well as down into the Pacific Northwest and Sierra Nevada; the Southern flying squirrel lives in the Eastern half of North America from southern Canada down to Florida, with isolated pockets in Central America.

Gliding has evolved independently in a variety of arboreal animals. Among mammals, there are the marsupial gliding possums of Australia, the colugos of SE Asia, and the scaly-tailed flying squirrels of Africa. Each group glides in a slightly different way, with their patagia being controlled by different morphological adaptations. In some marsupial gliders for example, the patagium attaches at the elbows, whereas in colugos it extends into webbed digits. The fact that all flying squirrels are "wrist gliders" with shared wrist anatomy suggests that they are all descended from a common ancestor, presumably some sort of primitive tree squirrel. Non-mammalian arboreal gliders include frogs, geckos, snakes, lizards, and even ants.

== Status ==
This species has a wide distribution and a presumed large population, it occurs in many protected areas, and the International Union for Conservation of Nature has rated it as being of "least concern".
