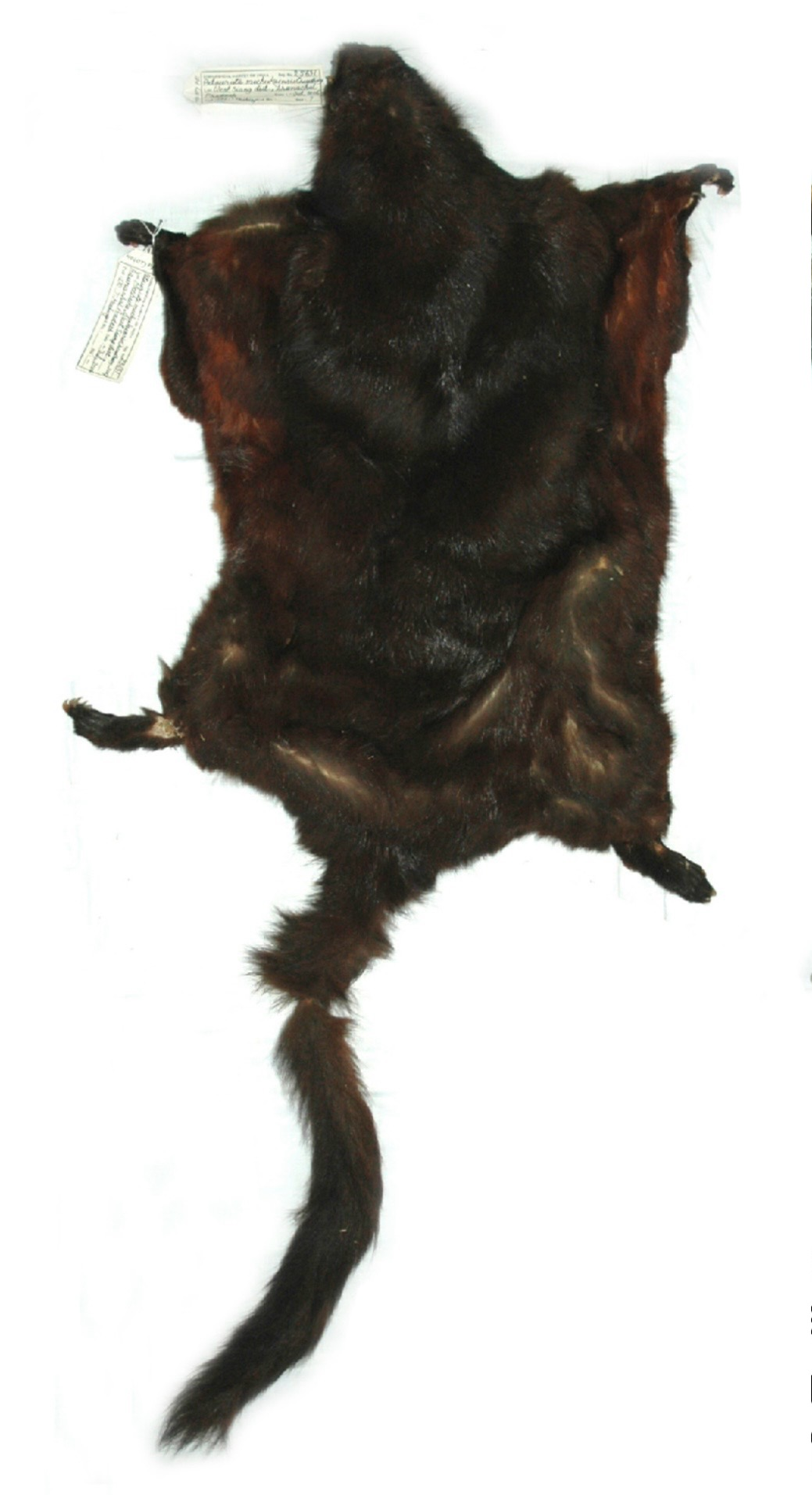

Conservation status
- Data Deficient (IUCN 3.1)

Scientific classification (disputed)
- Kingdom: Animalia
- Phylum: Chordata
- Class: Mammalia
- Order: Rodentia
- Family: Sciuridae
- Genus: Petaurista
- Species: P. mechukaensis

Binomial name
- Petaurista mechukaensis Choudhury, 2009

= Mechuka giant flying squirrel =

Species of rodent

The Mechuka giant flying squirrel (Petaurista mechukaensis) is a species of rodent in the family Sciuridae. First described in 2007 from East Himalayan forests at altitudes of 1,500–2,500 m (4,900–8,200 ft) in the region of Mechuka of north-central Arunachal Pradesh in India, its taxonomic status and position is not fully resolved. it was originally described as P. nigra but has been replaced by mechukaensis because it was a primary homonym of P. nigra Wang 1981.

== Taxonomy and appearance ==
In 2016, it was proposed that mechukaensis is the same species as the taxon nigra, which was described in 1981 from northwestern Yunnan in China and traditionally has been considered a part of the Indian or red giant flying squirrel. If confirmed and recognized as a distinct species, this means that the correct scientific name for the Mechuka giant flying squirrel is Petaurista nigra. In a genetic study published in 2006, nigra (initially misidentified as yunanensis) was found to be closely related to albiventer. The position of albiventer is itself disputed; although traditionally considered a subspecies of the red giant flying squirrel, strong evidence points to it being a separate species, which has been followed by several recent authorities. Based on genetic evidence, nigra can be considered a subspecies of P. albiventer or a closely related separate species. In 2017, a new subspecies muzongensis that is closely associated with nigra was described from southeastern Xizang, China, quite near to the border with Arunachal Pradesh, India. These two and mechukaensis have ochraceous–buff or orange–buff underparts, becoming deep rufous–chestnut towards the edge of the patagium. The head and upperparts are dark chestnut, darker towards the upper back and head, and the tail is blackish. The taxon nigra can be distinguished by the scattered creamy–white guard hairs on its mid to lower back (largely absent from head and shoulder region), resulting in this region having an overall dark but grizzled appearance unlike muzongensis and mechukaensis. The taxa muzongensis and mechukaensis, which were described close to each other but on separate sides of the China–India border, are extremely similar (if not identical). Based on a small number of specimens, nigra, muzongensis and mechukaensis are relatively large, with measurements in the upper range of that reported for the red giant flying squirrel.
