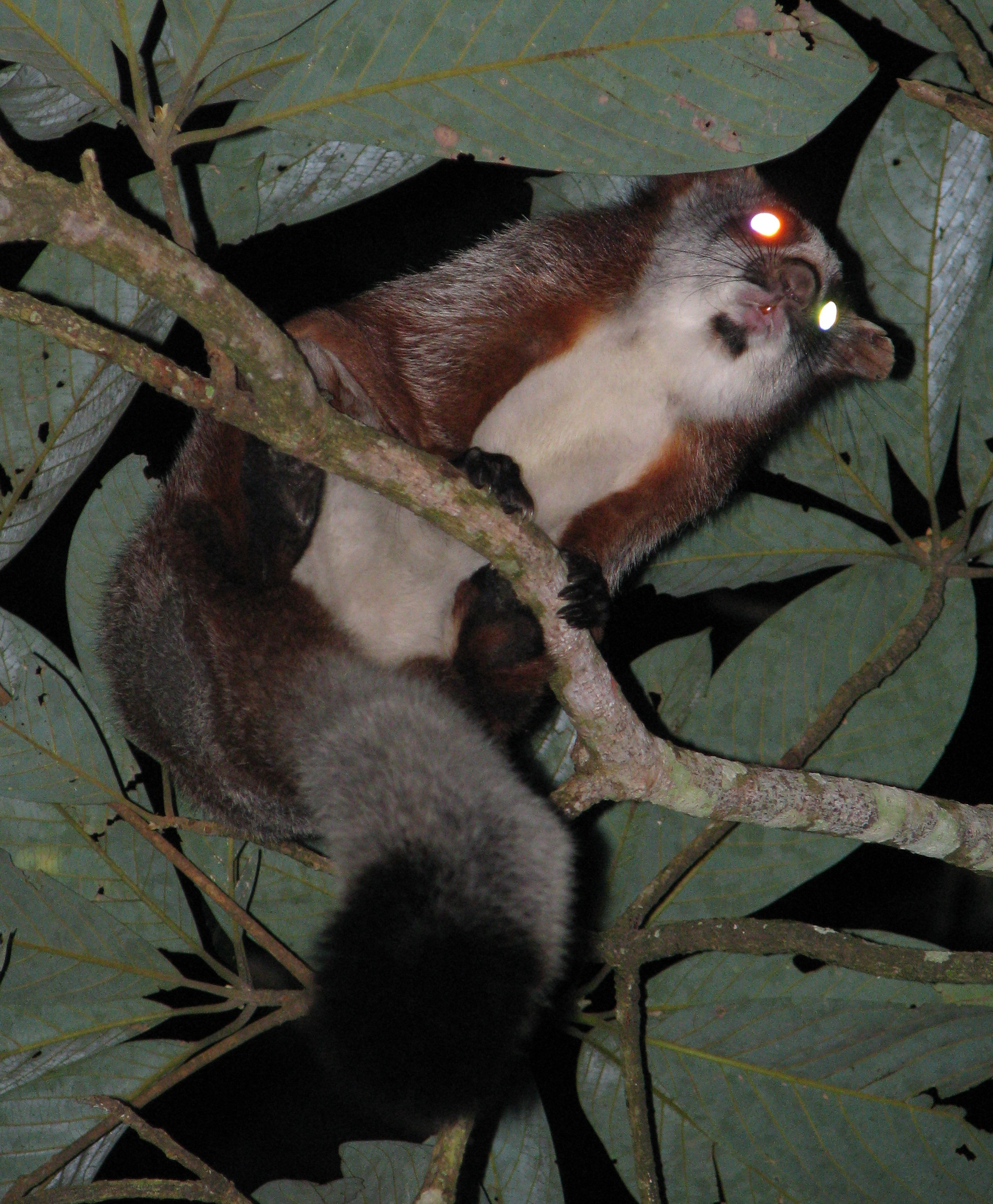
- P. p. candidula in Namdapha National Park, northeast India

Conservation status
- Least Concern (IUCN 3.1)

Scientific classification
- Kingdom: Animalia
- Phylum: Chordata
- Class: Mammalia
- Order: Rodentia
- Family: Sciuridae
- Genus: Petaurista
- Species: P. petaurista

Binomial name
- Petaurista petaurista (Pallas, 1766)
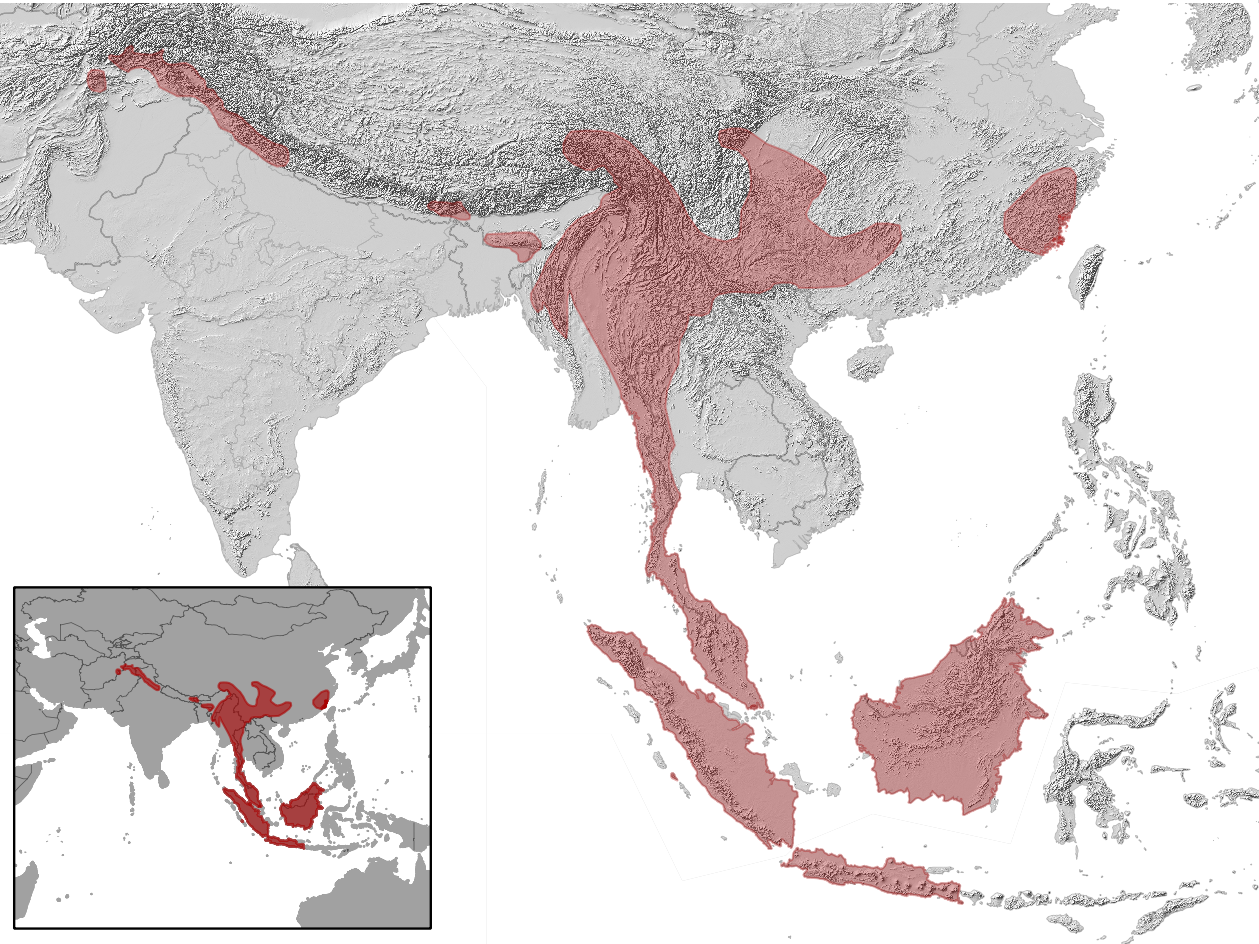
- Range in red as reported by the IUCN, but see text

= Red giant flying squirrel =

Species of rodent

The red giant flying squirrel or common giant flying squirrel (Petaurista petaurista) is a species of rodent in the family Sciuridae (squirrels). It is found in a wide variety of forest–types, plantations and more open habitats with scattered trees in Southeast Asia, ranging north to the Himalayas and southern and central China. One of the largest arboreal squirrels, all populations have at least some reddish-brown above and pale underparts, but otherwise there are significant geographic variations in the colours. The taxonomic position of those in the Sundaic region is generally agreed upon, but there is considerable uncertainty about the others, which variously have been included in this or other species, or recognized as their own species.

Like other flying squirrels, the red giant flying squirrel is mostly nocturnal and able to glide (not actually fly like a bat) long distances between trees by spreading out its patagium, skin between its limbs. It is a herbivore and the female has one, infrequently two, young per litter. Although declining locally due to habitat loss and to a lesser degree hunting, it remains overall common and it is not a threatened species.

== Distribution, appearance and taxonomy ==
The red giant flying squirrel is among the largest flying squirrels and longest squirrels. It has a head–and–body length of 28.5–55 cm (11 in – 1 ft 9.5 in), tail length of 34–63 cm (1 ft 1.5 in – 2 ft 1 in) and weighs about 990–3,200 g (2.2–7.1 lb). Within each region, males are generally somewhat smaller, at least in weight, than females.

It varies considerably in appearance depending on subspecies and location. Roughly, it can be divided into the following subspecies groups, some of which variously have been regarded as part of this species, the Indian giant flying squirrel (P. philippensis), the red and white giant flying squirrel (P. alborufus) or the spotted giant flying squirrel (P. elegans), or their own separate species. Up until the 1980s, some authorities even listed the Indian giant flying squirrel itself as a subspecies of the red giant flying squirrel.

=== Nominate subspecies group ===
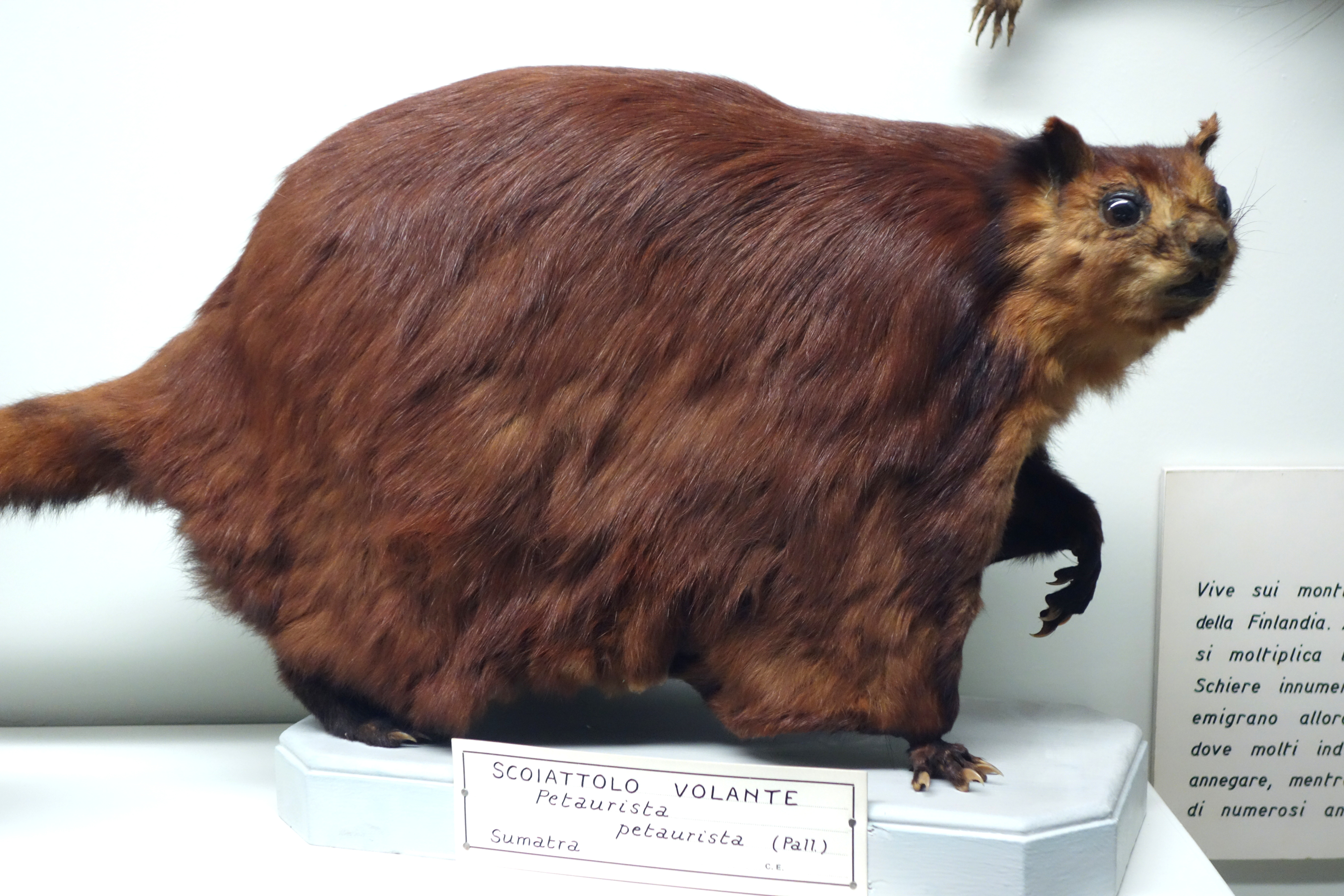
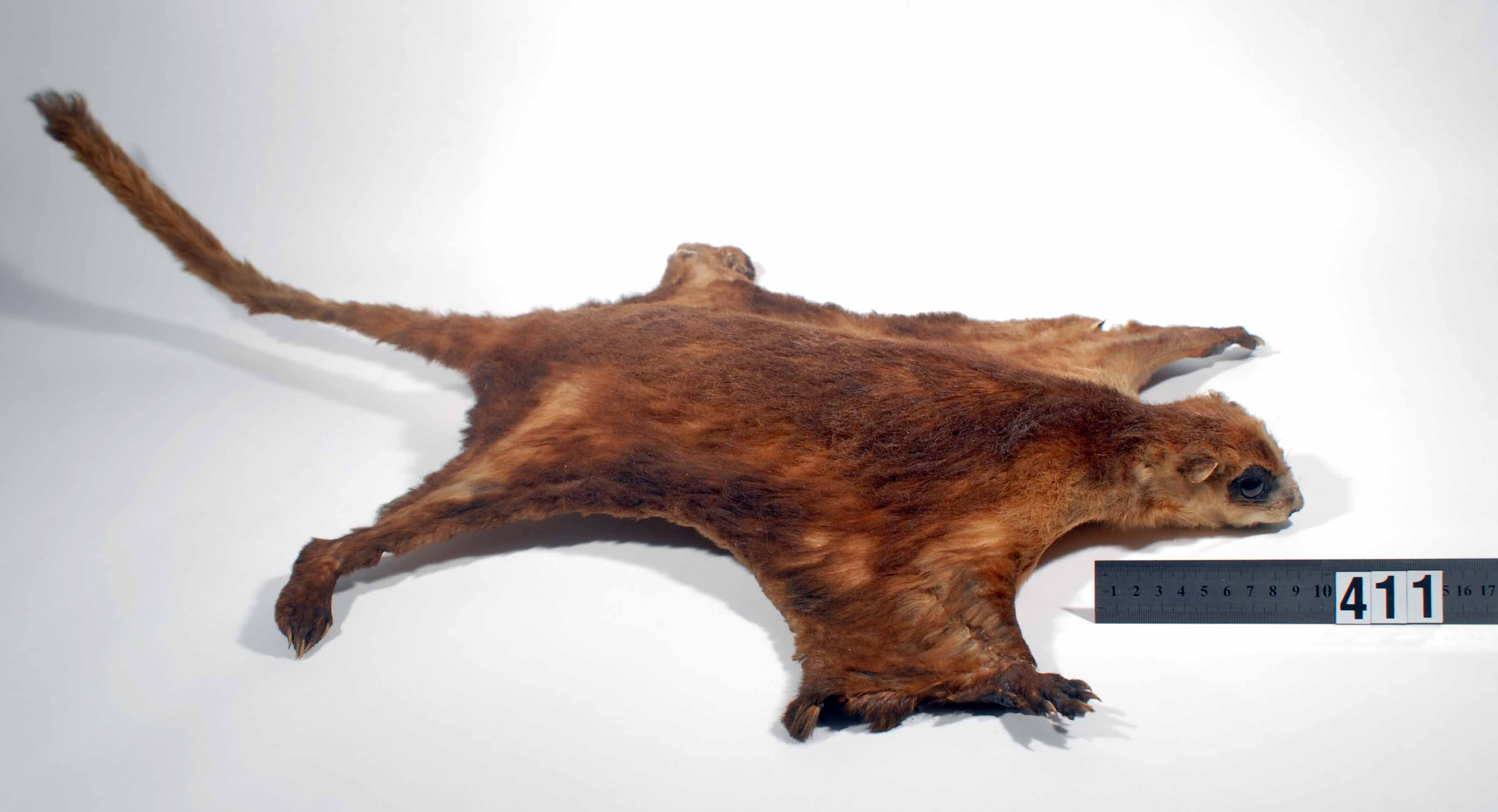
Two museum specimens of the nominate subspecies group, upper from Sumatra, lower without location

The red giant flying squirrel sensu stricto is the nominate subspecies group (P. p. petaurista and most other subspecies, excluding those mentioned in later groups). The distribution of this group essentially equals the Sundaic region, including Java, Sumatra, Borneo, the Thai-Malay Peninsula, nearby smaller islands, and Singapore (last Singaporean record in 1986, possibly extirpated). They generally inhabit lowlands and foothills, typically below 900–1,000 m (3,000–3,300 ft) elevation.

Members of the nominate group are medium to dark reddish-brown above and the underparts, including the face, are light orangish-brown to buff. The tail is reddish-brown or orangish-brown and its tip is black. The feet/hands, rings around the eyes and area near the nose are black. The various subspecies in this group are generally quite similar, varying primarily in the exact hue of the upper- and underparts, and to a small degree their size. In the darkest, the upperparts have some black hairs intermixed with the reddish-brown. In Java, much of the tail (not just the tip) can be black. Two subspecies, terutaus from Ko Tarutao in the Andaman Sea off the Thai mainland and taylori from Tenasserim in southern Myanmar and adjacent western Thailand, are located roughly in between the nominate subspecies group and the barroni–candidula subspecies group. Although largely similar to the former group, they have some grizzling to the upperparts and more whitish to the head, thus approaching the latter group.

Although the members of the nominate subspecies group are quite similar and appear to be part of the same species, considerable taxonomic uncertainty exists for all populations (groups) outside the Sundaic region. Locally in Thailand, the nominate subspecies group and the barroni–candidula subspecies group are sympatric, leading some authors to recognize them as separate species. The other groups have ranges that are fully separated from the nominate subspecies group. Limited genetic data is available for the nominate subspecies group. A study in 2002 found that Bornean red giant flying squirrels (a part of the nominate group) were relatively closely related to a clade that contains the white-bellied (albiventer) and Yunnan giant flying squirrels (yunanensis subspecies group), but more distantly related to a clade that contains red giant flying squirrels from an unspecified location in southern China and perhaps Laos. Using several of the same samples, a genetic study in 2004 came to another result, finding that Bornean red giant flying squirrels were very closely related to the southern China population, but more distant to the white-bellied giant flying squirrel (albiventer). The same southern Chinese and perhaps Laos specimens have been used in other genetic studies in 2004–2006 where they were labelled as melanotus, a subspecies in the nominate group from the Thai-Malay Peninsula (far from China and Laos). Later studies that used these samples have typically only listed them as red giant flying squirrels from southern China and perhaps Laos without exact subspecies, although likely rufipes (at least in part) as all other groups found in southern China were listed separately. The southern China–perhaps Laos population is very close to the Formosan giant flying squirrel (grandis), but distant from the white-bellied giant flying squirrel (albiventer), Yunnan giant flying squirrel (yunanensis subspecies group) and other giant flying squirrel species. Based on these data, each of these could be regarded as its own species. Alternatively, the southern China–perhaps Laos population and Formosan giant flying squirrel could be regarded as subspecies of one species and the white-bellied and Yunnan giant flying squirrels as subspecies of another species; whether the nominate subspecies group is associated with the former or the latter is disputed. Merging the nominate subspecies group, southern China–perhaps Laos population, and the Formosan, white-bellied and Yunnan giant flying squirrels into a single species would however result in a strongly polyphyletic grouping.

=== Barroni–candidula subspecies group ===
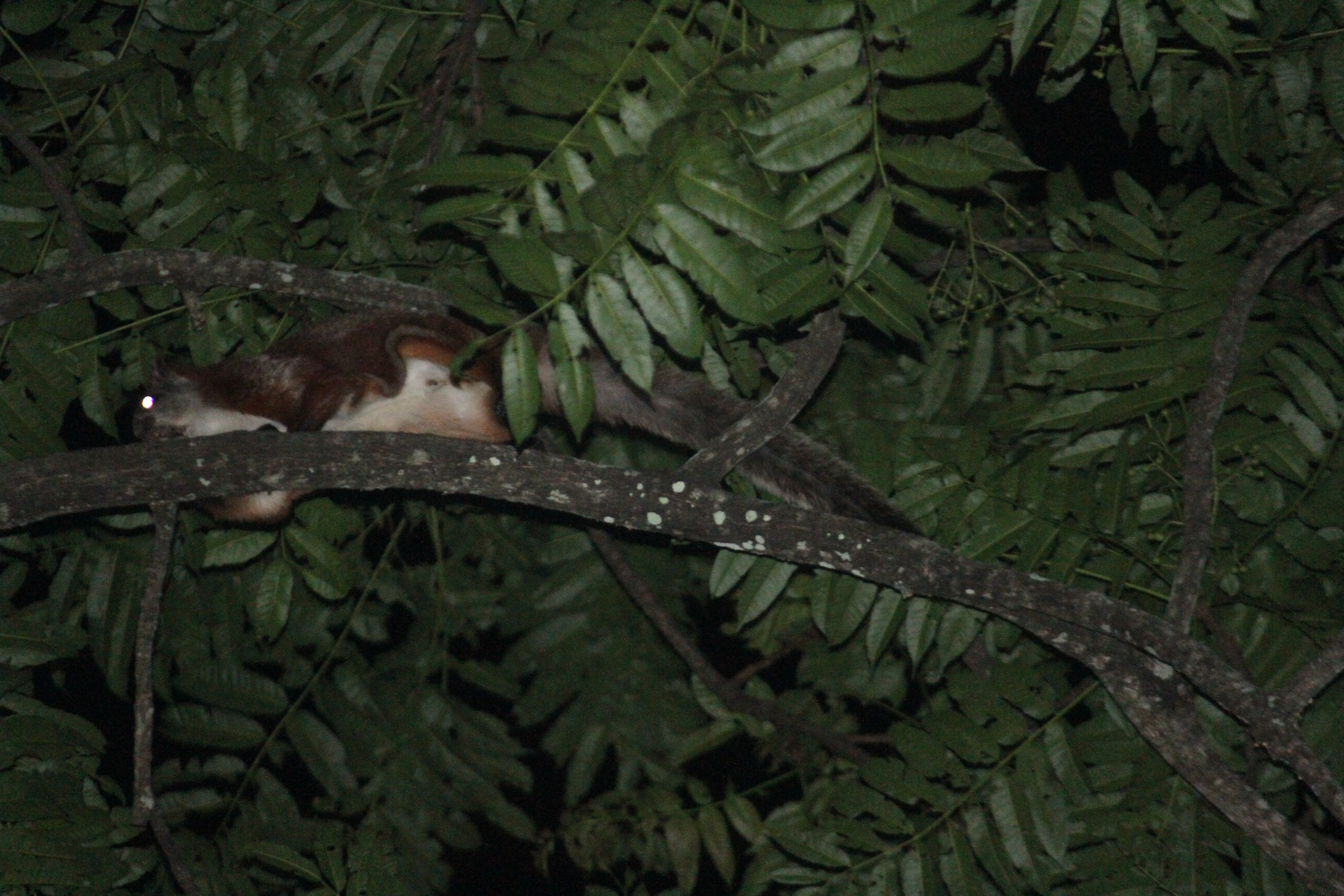
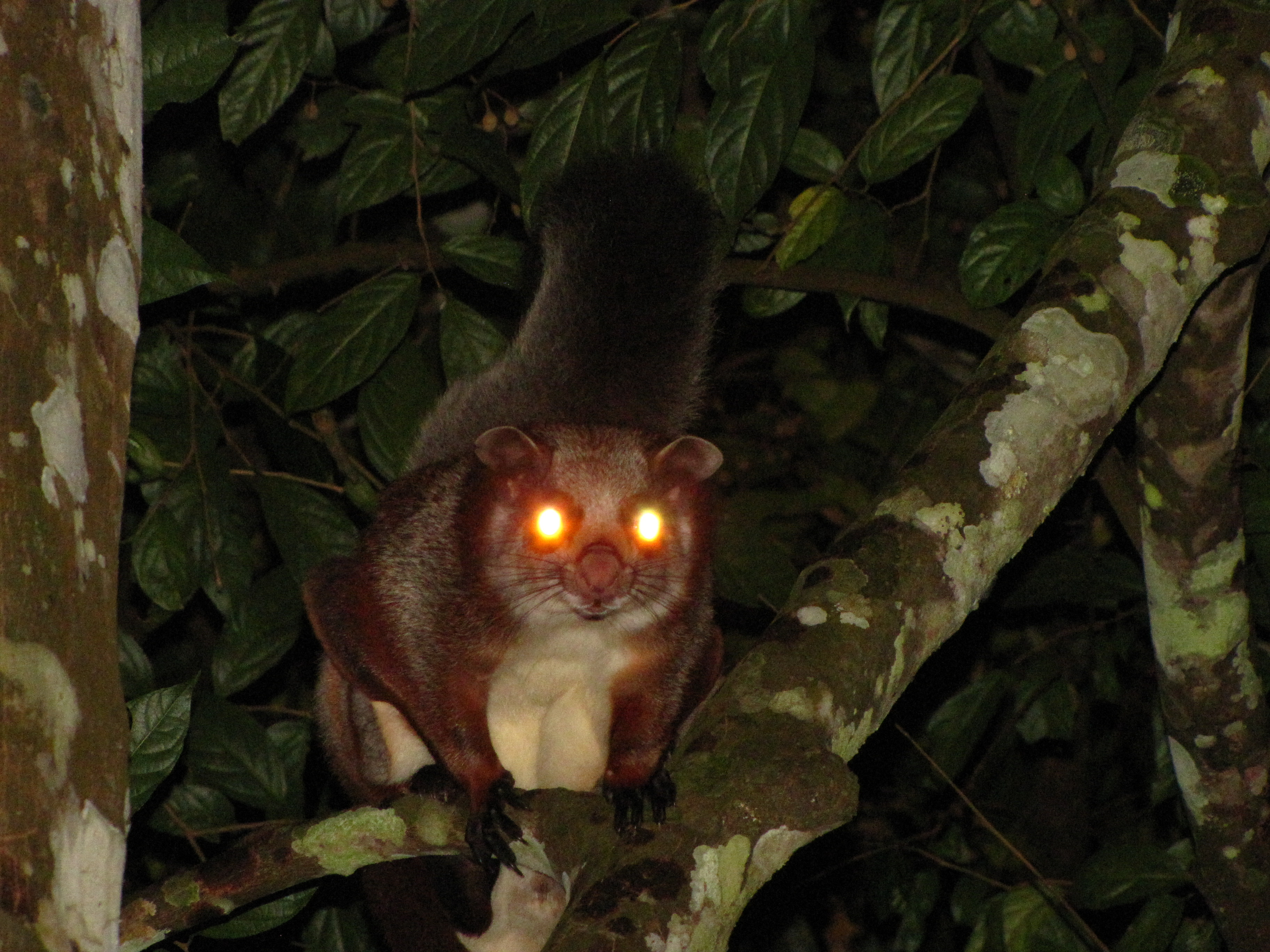
P. p. candidula is quite different from the red giant flying squirrel's others subspecies groups, but it is easily confused with the very rare Namdapha flying squirrel

The taxon barroni is found in central and southeastern Thailand and southern Laos. The taxon candidula is found in Myanmar, northern Thailand, and northeastern India (at least eastern Arunachal Pradesh, eastern Assam and Nagaland). Individuals in eastern Bangladesh are similar in their appearance, if not the same.

Members of the barroni–candidula subspecies group are chestnut-brown above with the central parts, from the nape to the rump, with many whitish hairs resulting in a grizzled appearance. The underparts, including the throat, are whitish. The black-tipped tail is buffy-grey (candidula) or grey-brown (barroni). Much of the head, including the cheeks and forehead, is grey-white, but with blackish-red rings around the eyes. This is overall similar to the very rare Namdapha flying squirrel (Biswamoyopterus biswasi), which has resulted in frequent misidentifications. Based on a small number of specimens, members of the barroni–candidula subspecies group are medium-large in size, with measurements in the mid to upper range of that reported for the red giant flying squirrel.

Since the 1950s, both barroni and candidula have generally been included either as subspecies or as synonyms in the red giant flying squirrel or the red and white giant flying squirrel. Despite the close similarity, barroni and candidula have otherwise frequently been treated very differently in terms of their taxonomy. For example, in 2005, Mammal Species of the World opted to regard candidula as a subspecies of the red giant flying squirrel, while barroni was regarded as a synonym of albiventer (albiventer being a subspecies of the red giant flying squirrel according to that review). In a review in 2012, albiventer was recognized as a separate species, but—partially affected by the review in 2005—opted to include barroni as a valid subspecies of it, although noting that its position requires further study. In contrast, candidula was considered a subspecies of the red and white giant flying squirrel based on its colours.

=== White-bellied giant flying squirrel ===
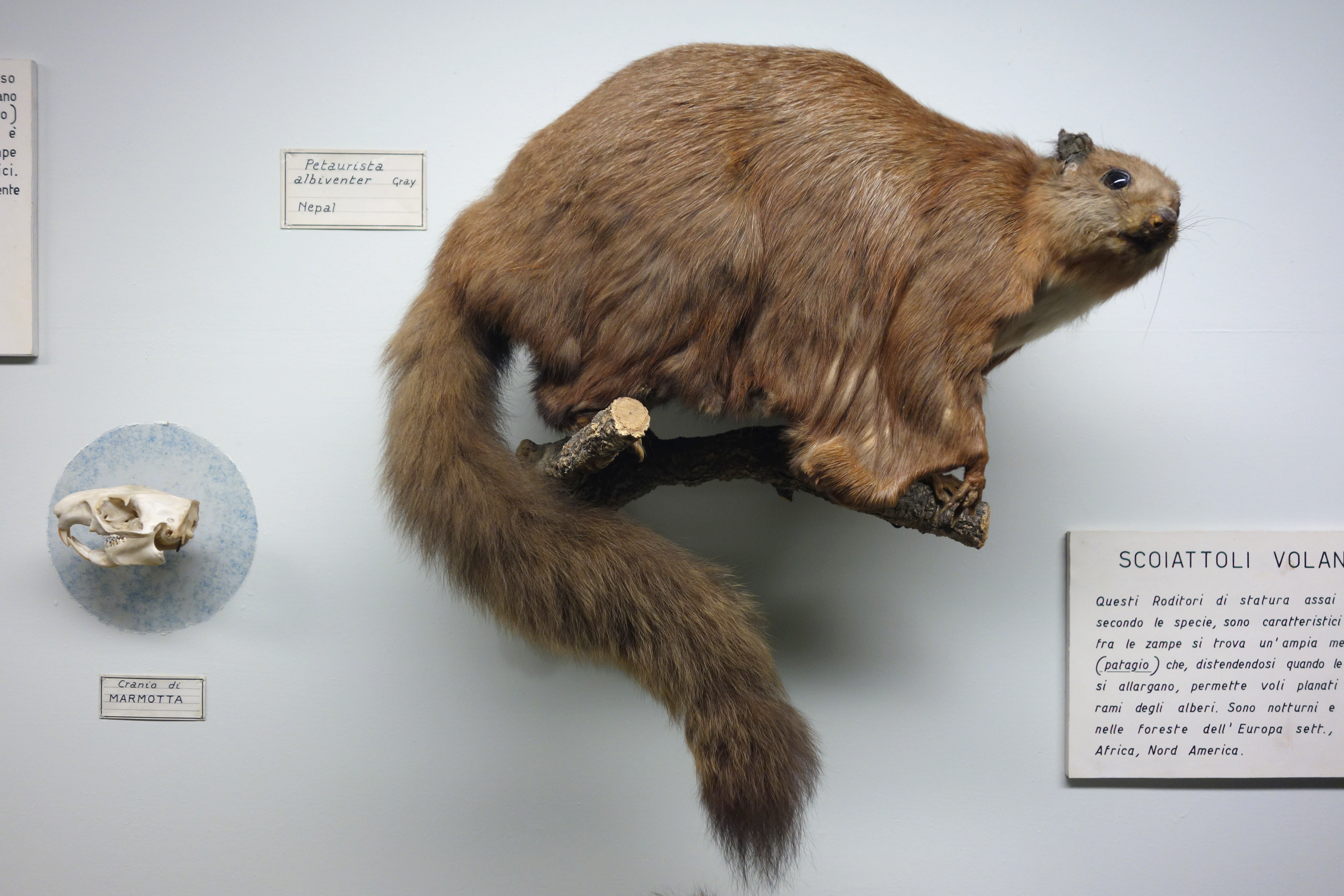
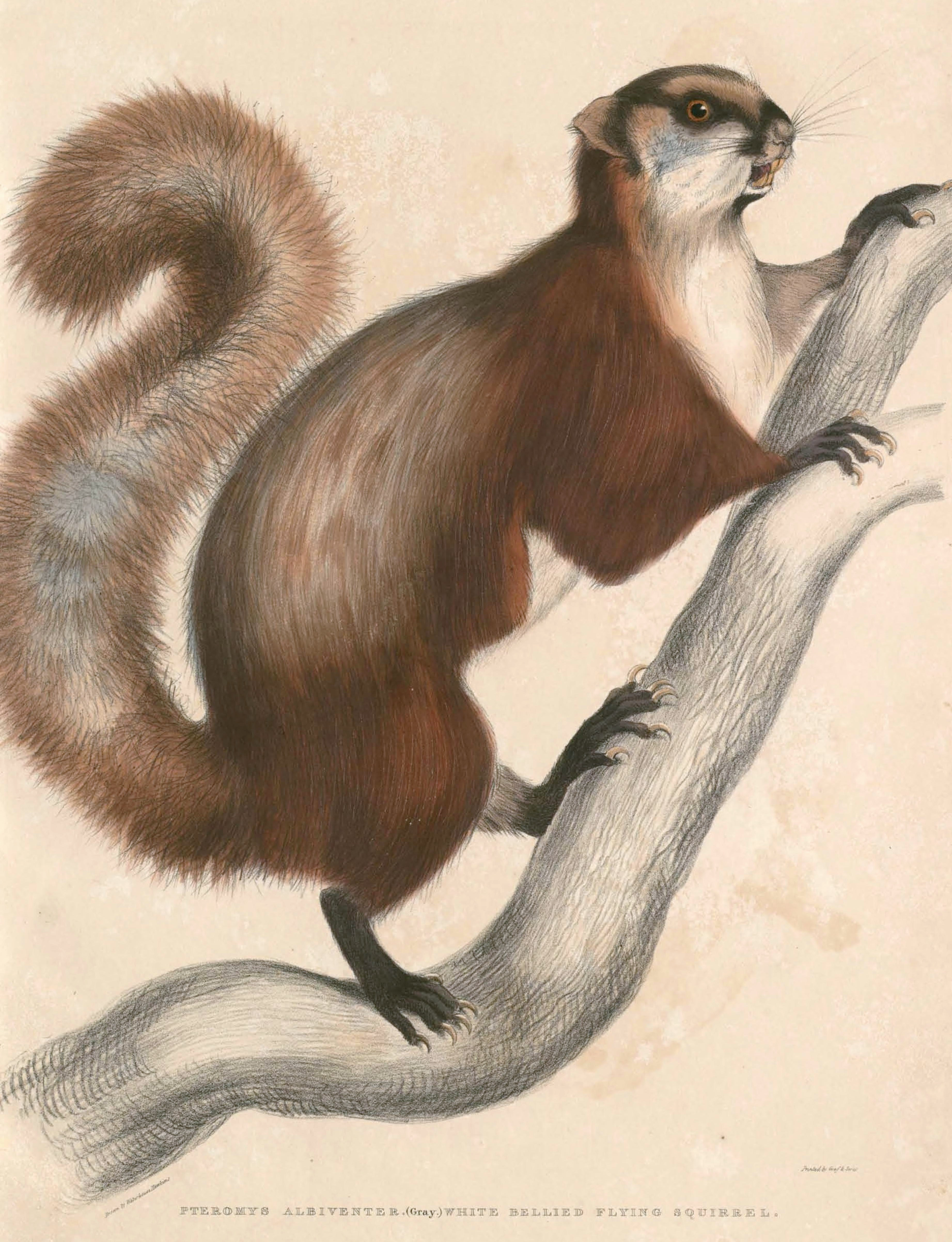
P. (p.) albiventer: foxed ("faded") museum specimen above, painting from Hardwicke and Gray's Illustrations of Indian Zoology (1830–1835) below

The white-bellied giant flying squirrel (albiventer) is from the western and central Himalayan region in northeastern Afghanistan, through northern Pakistan and northern India, at least to Nepal (formerly reported east to Yunnan in China, but this is now recognized as separate, see Yunnan giant flying squirrel). In Nepal it occurs at altitudes from 150 to 1,500 m (490–4,920 ft), but in Pakistan from 1,350 to 3,050 m (4,430–10,010 ft) with the upper limit equalling the tree line.

Its upperparts are reddish-mahogany or reddish-chestnut with many whitish hairs resulting in a grizzled appearance. The underparts are pale buffy to whitish, and the throat and cheeks are whitish. The tail is brown, often with a black tip, and the feet/hands are blackish. Melanistic individuals are known from the Kaghan Valley in Pakistan. The white-bellied giant flying squirrel is medium-large in size, with measurements in the mid to upper range of those reported for the red giant flying squirrel.

Since the 1950s, most authorities placed albiventer as a subspecies of the red giant flying squirrel. In the early 2000s, several genetic studies revealed that albiventer is relatively closely related to the members of the yunanensis group, but quite distantly related to other giant flying squirrels. As a consequence, recent authorities often have recognized it as a separate species, the white-bellied giant flying squirrel (P. albiventer), sometimes with barroni or members of the yunanensis group as its subspecies.

=== Yunnan giant flying squirrel ===
The yunanensis subspecies group (including nigra, muzongensis and mechukaensis), often incorrectly modified to yunnanensis, is found in highlands of northeast India (at least northern and eastern Arunachal Pradesh), far northwestern Yunnan and southeastern Tibet in China, Myanmar, northern Laos and northern Vietnam, although the extent of its range in the last three countries is labelled with considerable uncertainty.

Members of this group have dark reddish-chestnut upperparts, darker towards the upper back and head, a blackish tail with a greyish or reddish-chestnut base, and brown-black feet/hands, muzzle and around the eyes. The underparts are light ochraceous-buff and the throat is whitish. In yunanensis, the central upperparts, from the top of the head and shoulders to the rump, have extensive scattered creamy-white guard hairs resulting in a grizzled appearance. In nigra, this is of more limited extent, mostly on the mid and lower back. In muzongensis and mechukaensis, this is essentially absent. Despite being distantly related, yunanensis is easily confused with the rare Mount Gaoligong flying squirrel (Biswamoyopterus gaoligongensis). Members of the yunanensis subspecies group are medium-large in size, with measurements in the mid to upper range of that reported for the red giant flying squirrel.

Traditionally, only yunanensis was recognized, variously as a subspecies of the red or the Indian giant flying squirrel, and often including several highly distinctive populations, notably hainana, rubicundus and rufipes, as synonyms. In 2006, a genetic study showed that yunanensis is fairly closely related to the white-bellied giant flying squirrel (albiventer), but quite distantly related to other giant flying squirrels, leading several recent authorities to recognize it as its own species, the Yunnan giant flying squirrel (P. yunanensis). In 2017, a review of Chinese "yunanensis" found that nigra (typically considered a synonym of yunanensis) of northwestern Yunnan is distinct and that individuals from southeastern Tibet should be recognized as the new subspecies muzongensis; thus effectively limiting the Chinese range of true yunanensis to southwestern Yunnan. Samples used in the 2006 genetic study (and a few other studies that used the same) actually were nigra rather than yunanensis. Although all are very similar in their general appearance, it was suggested that yunanensis should remain part of the Indian giant flying squirrel based on cranial morphometrics, while nigra and muzongensis should be considered subspecies of the white-bellied giant flying squirrel. An alternative option is to recognize it as its own species, P. nigra with subspecies muzongensis, or all as subspecies of P. yunanensis. In 2007 and 2009, two very similar new species were described from northeastern India: the Mechuka giant flying squirrel (P. mechukaensis) of north-central Arunachal Pradesh and Mishmi giant flying squirrel (P. mishmiensis) of northeastern Arunachal Pradesh. In 2016, it was proposed that mechukaensis is a part of P. nigra, but the taxonomic position of both it and mishmiensis require further study.

=== Subspecies rubicundus and rufipes ===
Both rubicundus and rufipes are restricted to China, with the former from the central states of Gansu, Shaanxi and Sichuan, and the latter from the southeastern states of Fujian, Guangdong, Guangxi and Yunnan. Although rufipes does occur very close to the border with northern Laos and northern Vietnam, it has not been confirmed in either country.

They generally resemble typical members of the nominate subspecies group, but they have brown (not black) feet/hands, especially rufipes is more ferruginous or tawny above, and the entire tail of rufipes is ferruginous or tawny (no black tail-tip).

The taxonomic position of these Chinese taxa has been greatly disputed. In 2003 and 2008, Chinese authorities recognized rufipes as a subspecies of the red giant flying squirrel, while rubicundus variously was placed as a subspecies of the Indian or the Chindwin giant flying squirrel (itself often considered a subspecies of the spotted giant flying squirrel). Despite their appearance, it was suggested in 2005 in Mammal Species of the World that both rubicundus and rufipes should be regarded as synonyms of yunanensis, which was repeated in another taxonomic review in 2012. The cranial morphometrics of rufipes (data is lacking for rubicundus) differ distinctly from those of the yunanensis subspecies group. A secondary problem is related to the name rufipes: In 1925, the population in southeastern China was described using this name. In 1949, the population in southeastern Sumatra (a part of red giant flying squirrel's nominate subspecies group) was described, also using the name rufipes. Consequently, if both are recognized as valid subspecies of the red giant flying squirrel, the replacement name sodyi is used for the southeast Sumatran population.

=== Formosan giant flying squirrel ===
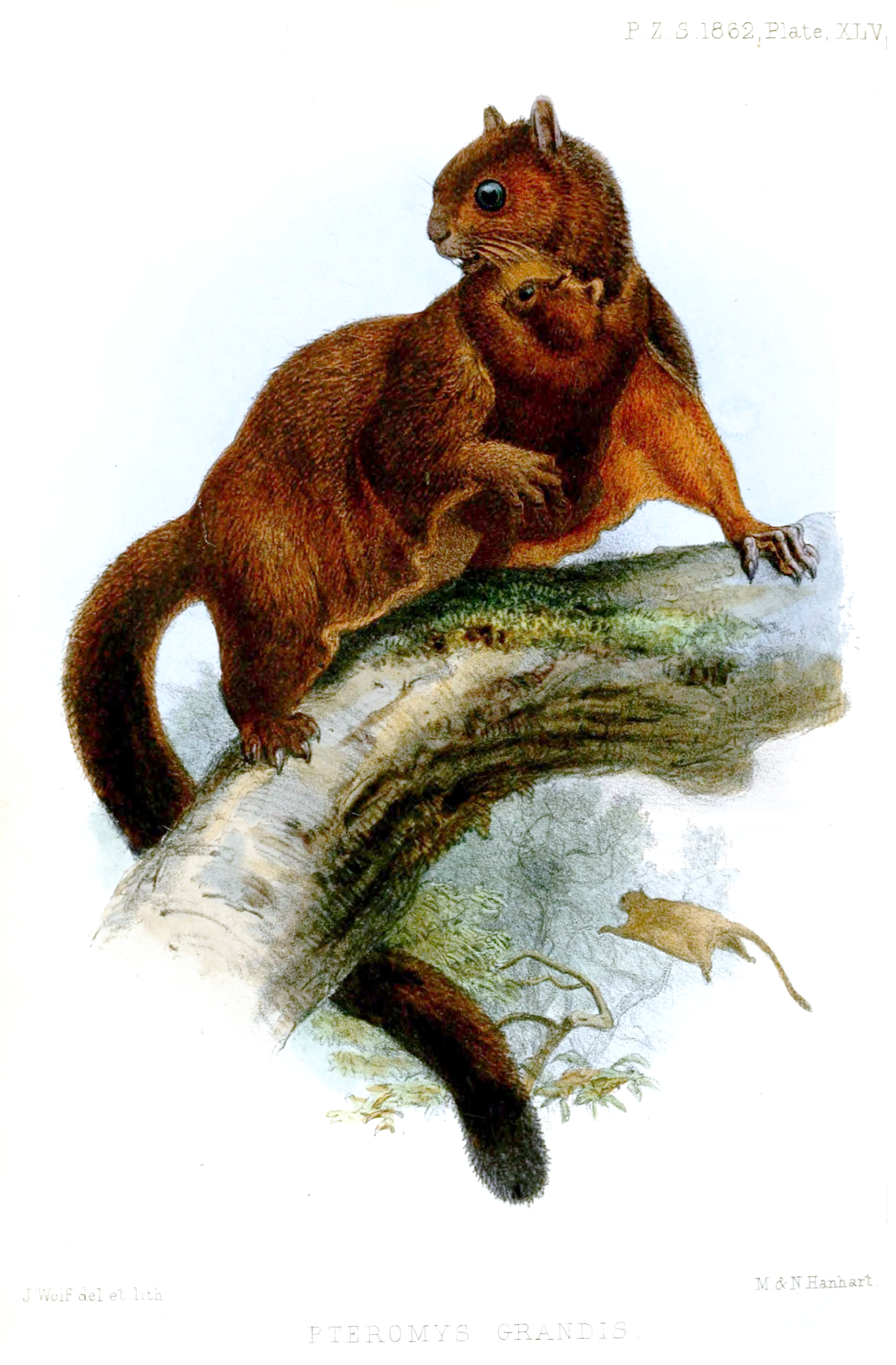
P. (p.) grandis with young on its chest

The Formosan giant flying squirrel (grandis) is from Taiwan, historically known as Formosa, at altitudes of 100–2,500 m (330–8,200 ft), but mostly 500–2,000 m (1,600–6,600 ft). Although there is significant overlap and they do occur together, the Formosan giant flying squirrel tends to occupy lower altitudes than the Taiwan giant flying squirrel (P. (alborufus) lena). These are the only giant flying squirrels of the island.

The Formosan giant flying squirrel is dark reddish-chestnut above, including the head, and the underparts, including the throat, are orange-ochre. Except for its reddish-chestnut base, the tail is black. It is relatively small in size, with measurements in the lower range of those reported for the red giant flying squirrel.

Since the 1950s, grandis has most often been included as a subspecies of the Indian giant flying squirrel, although sometimes of the red giant flying squirrel. In 2006, a genetic study revealed that it is fairly closely related to the red giant flying squirrel, but quite distantly related to other giant flying squirrels. This has been confirmed by other studies, and recent authorities have placed it as a subspecies of the red giant flying squirrel or recognized it as its own species, the Formosan giant flying squirrel (P. grandis).

== Behavior ==
The red giant flying squirrel is largely nocturnal, starting its activity just before dusk and retreating at dawn. On occasion it may stay out until the mid-morning. The day is typically spent in a hole in a tree that is 10 m (33 ft) or more above the ground, although sometimes in rock crevices or a nest made of vegetation in a tree instead. In a study of seven nests in India's Namdapha National Park, one tree hole was c. 35 m (115 ft) above the ground, while the remaining were between about 15 and 21 m (49–69 ft) above the ground. Red giant flying squirrels and hornbills sometimes compete for the same tree holes.

=== Gliding ===
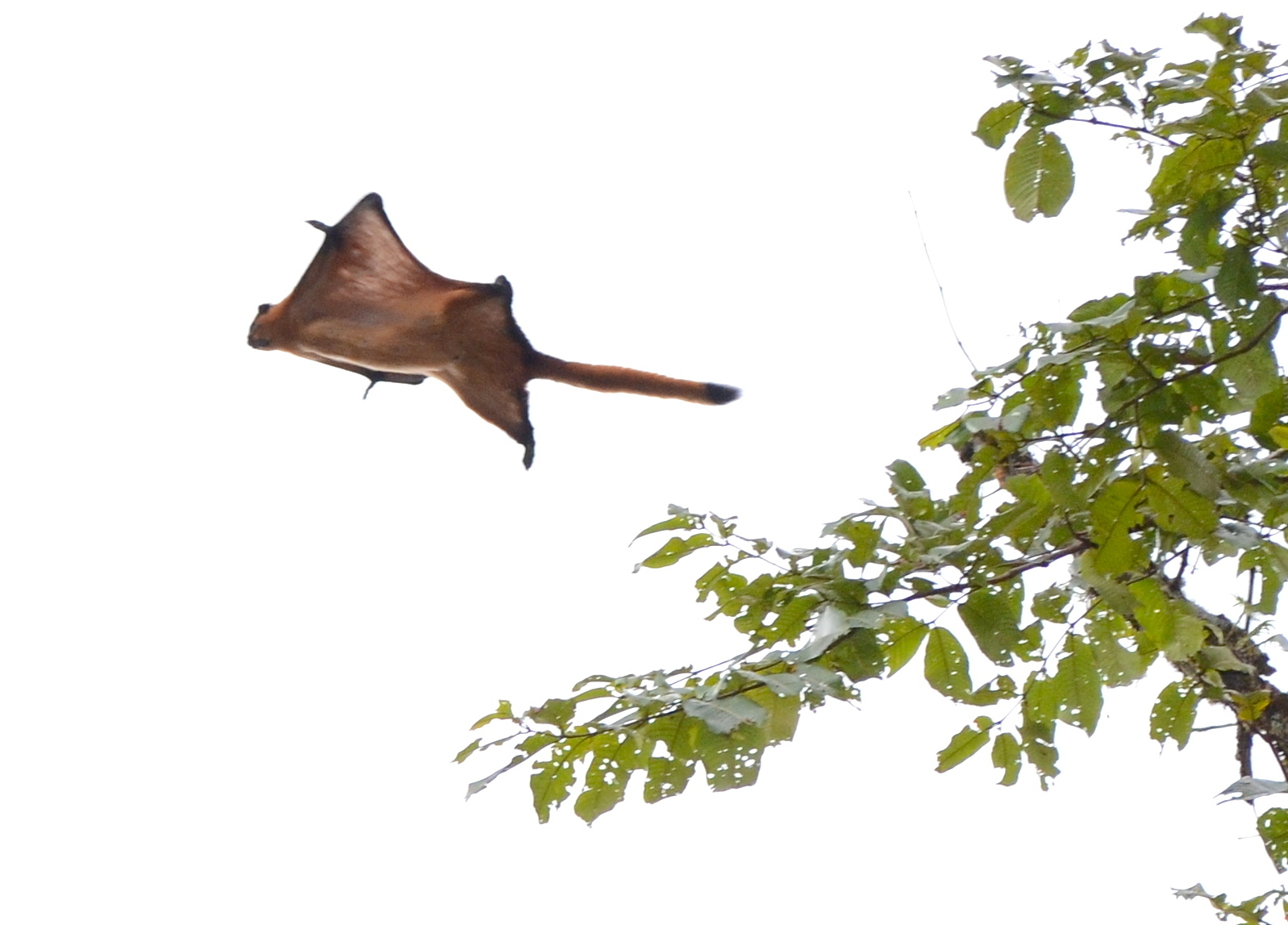
Gliding, in Sumatra

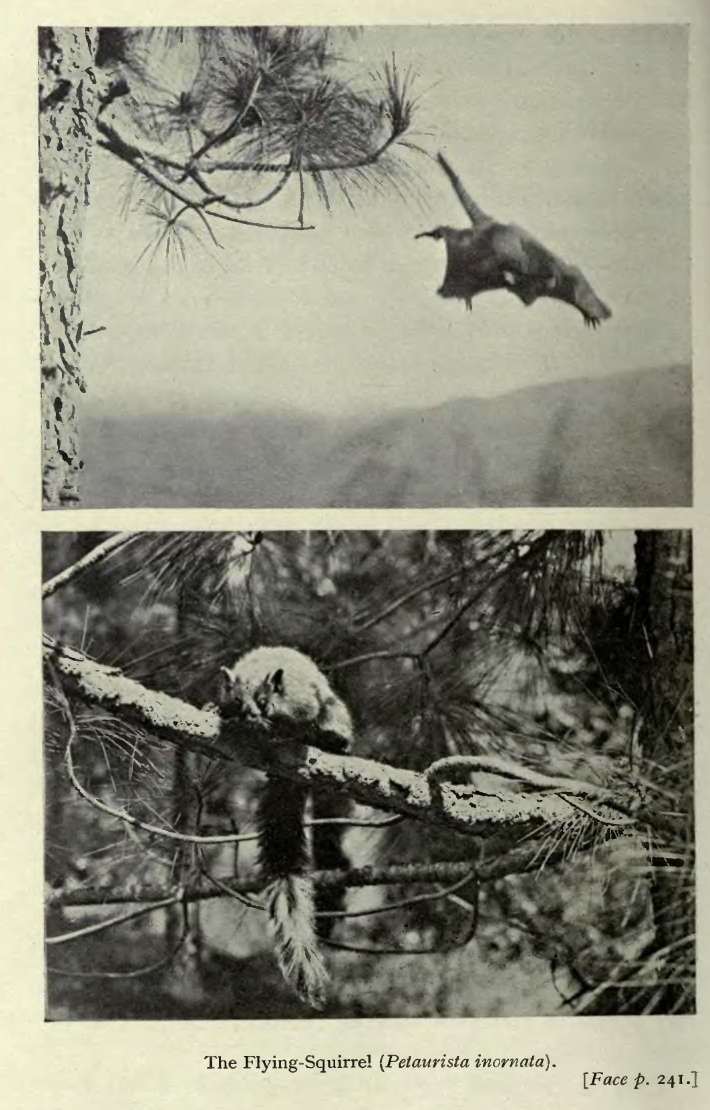
Gliding and perched P. (p.) albiventer, photographed in 1914–16 by Richard Hingston

The red giant flying squirrel usually travels between trees by long glides, up to at least 100–150 m (330–490 ft), reputedly even 450 m (1,480 ft). Most glides are no longer than 50 m (160 ft). Glides are most often launched from the upper tree canopy, less often the mid or lower canopy. The animal lands well below its launch height, as the typical glide angle is about 14–22°. Nevertheless, landing heights generally are more than 3 m (10 ft) above the ground and typically much higher. As long as the separation between remaining tall trees does not exceed its typical glide distance, this species survives well in degraded habitats, even willingly crossing highways. However, if distances between trees exceed the typical glide distance, it forms an efficient barrier for the species.

=== Feeding ===
The red giant flying squirrel is a herbivore, primarily a folivore, and has been recorded feeding on the leaves of many plant species. Young leaves are preferred over older leaves. Other items recorded in its diet are shoots, flowers, fruits, nuts, seeds, lichen, moss, twigs, bark and in the northern part of its range pine cones. In Taiwan alone, P. (p.) grandis has been recorded feeding on at least 30 species of plants from 19 families. When feeding extensively on bark it may kill trees in the process and for this reason it is sometimes considered a pest in conifer plantations, while its frugivory can result in conflicts with humans in fruit plantations. Although not fully confirmed, there are strong indications that flower-feeding red giant flying squirrels may function as pollinators of certain trees. Some populations, at least P. (p.) yunanensis, will visit specific locations to feed on minerals directly from cliffs/earth.

When only relatively poor food sources like older leaves are available, the red giant flying squirrel is still active, but less so compared to periods where richer food sources like young leaves and fruits are available. The populations that live in colder mountainous regions (for example, P. (p.) albiventer) remain active even when there is deep snow on the ground, but during this time may move to lower altitudes.

While some species of giant flying squirrels will supplement their diet with small animals, primarily insects, this has not been reported in the red giant flying squirrel.

=== Social life and breeding ===
Densities vary greatly in the red giant flying squirrel. In Taiwan (P. (p.) grandis), it varies from an average of around five animals per 20 ha (50 acres) in hardwood forests to around one-fifth that density in conifer plantations, although there are also reports of home ranges in the latter habitat that are as small as, or even a bit smaller, than the average reported in the former habitat. It is often the most common species of giant flying squirrel in the Sundaic region.

It has an oft-uttered call that especially is given at dusk, and in Himalaya (P. (p.) albiventer) has been described as a "monotonous repeated wail" or a "loud, penetrating and drawn-out whine". Sometimes small groups may actively call out to each other over a longer period. Otherwise the species typically occurs alone, or in pairs. The mother or pair are sometimes accompanied by a young, as they forage together for a few to several months after birth.

There is usually only one, infrequently two, young in a litter, as typical of giant flying squirrels. In Taiwan (P. (p.) grandis), there are two breeding seasons per year, with most births in January–February and July–August. In Uttarakhand of India, a young was found in a nest in May and in Malaysia pregnant females have been recorded in February. The young suckle for an extended period of time after being born; more than two months in P. (p.) albiventer.
