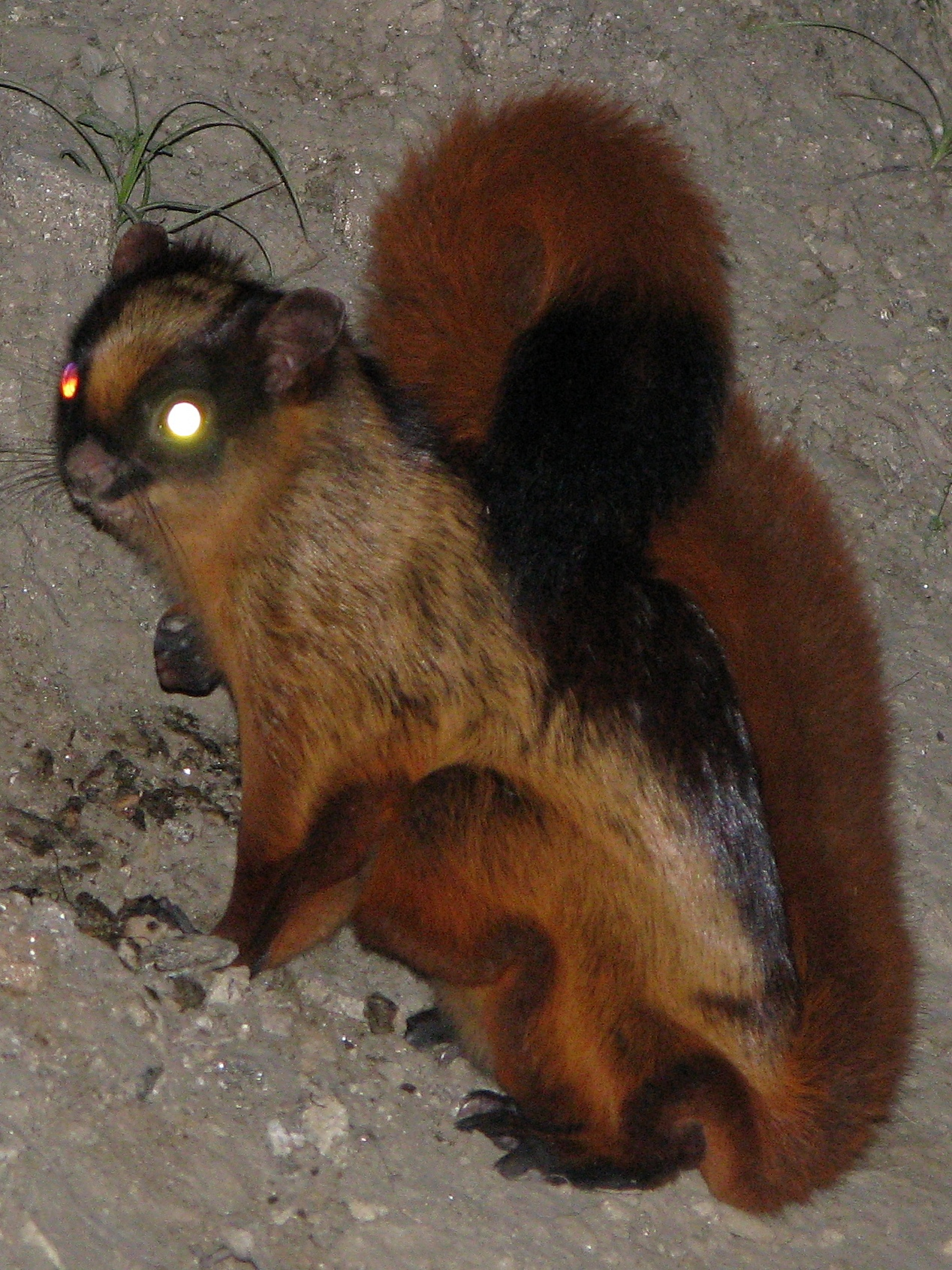
- In Sikkim, India

Conservation status
- Near Threatened (IUCN 3.1)

Scientific classification
- Kingdom: Animalia
- Phylum: Chordata
- Class: Mammalia
- Order: Rodentia
- Family: Sciuridae
- Genus: Petaurista
- Species: P. nobilis

Binomial name
- Petaurista nobilis (J. E. Gray, 1842)
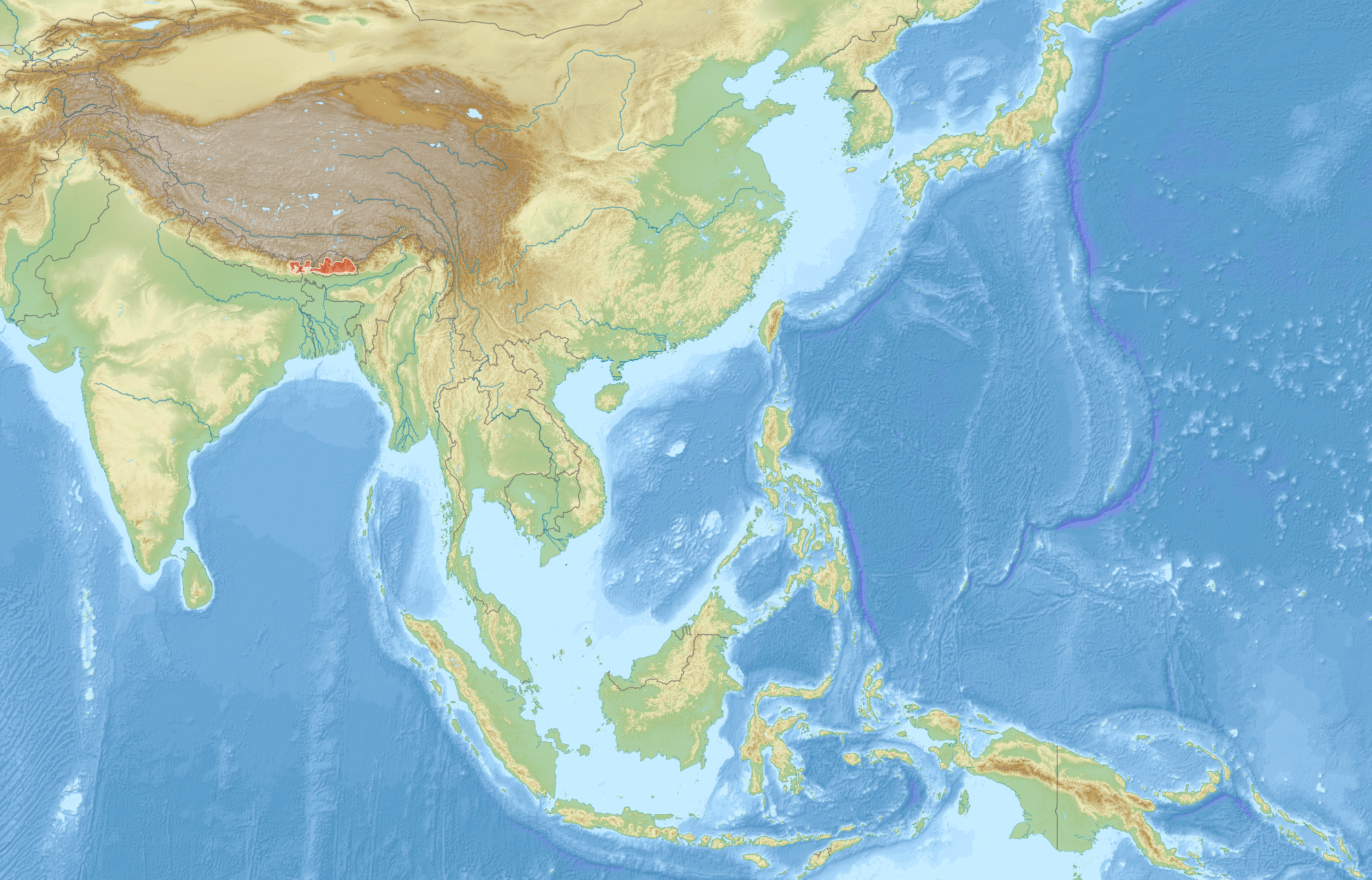
- Range in red

= Bhutan giant flying squirrel =

Bhutan Giant Flying Squirrel

Species of rodent

The Bhutan giant flying squirrel (Petaurista nobilis), also known as the Gray's giant flying squirrel or noble giant flying squirrel, is a species of rodent in the family Sciuridae. This species lives in Himalayan forests and it is one of the largest flying squirrels. Like other flying squirrels, it is mainly nocturnal and able to glide (not actually fly like a bat) long distances between trees by spreading out its patagium, skin between its limbs.

== Distribution ==
The Bhutan giant flying squirrel has a narrow range in the Himalayas where restricted to central and eastern Nepal, Bhutan, and the Indian states of Sikkim, far northern West Bengal, and western and central Arunachal Pradesh. It might occur in Tibet in China, but this remains unconfirmed.

== Appearance and taxonomy ==
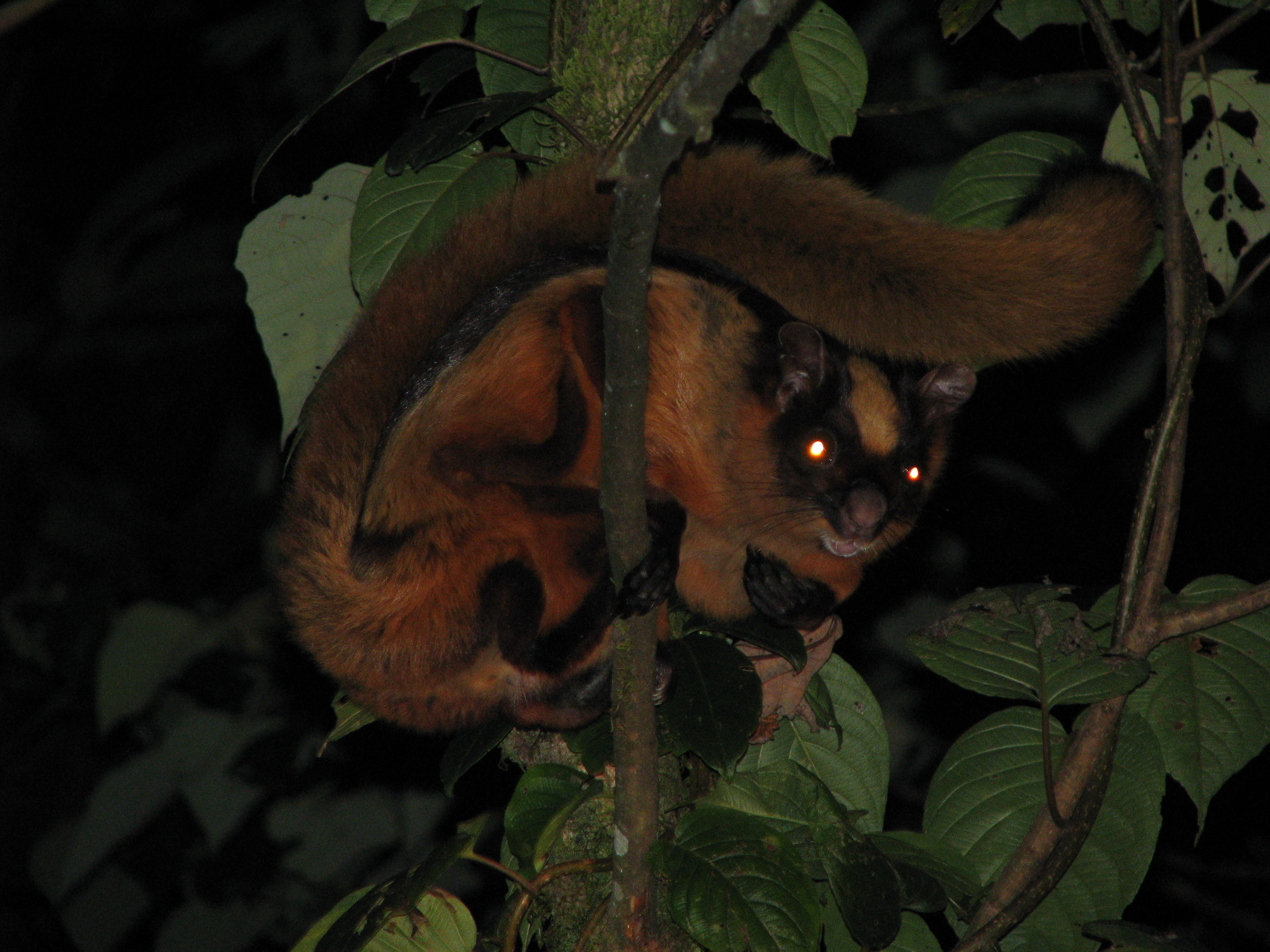
The subspecies P. n. singhei

The Bhutan giant flying squirrel is one of the largest flying squirrels with a head-and-body length of about 35–69 cm (1 ft 2 in – 2 ft 3 in), a tail length of 38–61.5 cm (1 ft 3 in – 2 ft 0 in) and a total length of up to c. 127 cm (4 ft 2 in). There are some variations in the proportions; some individuals have a longer tail than the head-and-body, but it is shorter in others. An individual that had a head-and-body length of 49 cm (1 ft 7 in) and a tail length of 46 cm (1 ft 6 in) weighed 2,710 g (5.97 lb). There are two subspecies: the western P. n. nobilis (Nepal, Sikkim and West Bengal) and eastern P. n. singhei (Bhutan and Arunachal Pradesh). The latter is generally larger and with a thicker pelage than the former.

The shoulders of the Bhutan giant flying squirrel are yellowish-buff or orange-buff and this colour extends along the flanks, bordering and clearly contrasting with the rich chestnut-brown or maroon-brown back ("saddle"). Although the saddle appears overall dark, some of the hairs have yellowish tips. In some individuals, the light colour of the shoulders and flanks extends even further to the posterior and join on the lowermost back, almost completely encircling the dark saddle. The top of the head is dark and often connected by a dark thin line or broad patch to the dark saddle. There is a distinct pale fulvous or orange-buff band/patch on the crown (making the dark top of the head appear rather like a bandit mask), although this band/patch occasionally is poorly defined or entirely absent in P. n. nobilis. Most P. n. nobilis have a distinct buff stripe along the mid-back (dividing the dark "saddle"), but it is occasionally incomplete or even absent. Most P. n. singhei lack this stripe and when present it is incomplete. The underside of the Bhutan giant flying squirrel is uniformly coloured light pale rufous, salmon-buff or ochre, and the patagium is orange-rufous. The orange-rufous tail has a black tip, and the limbs are orange-rufous, often with black fingers/toes. Overall, P. n. singhei is more richly coloured than P. n. nobilis.

=== Confusion with Hodgson's giant flying squirrel ===
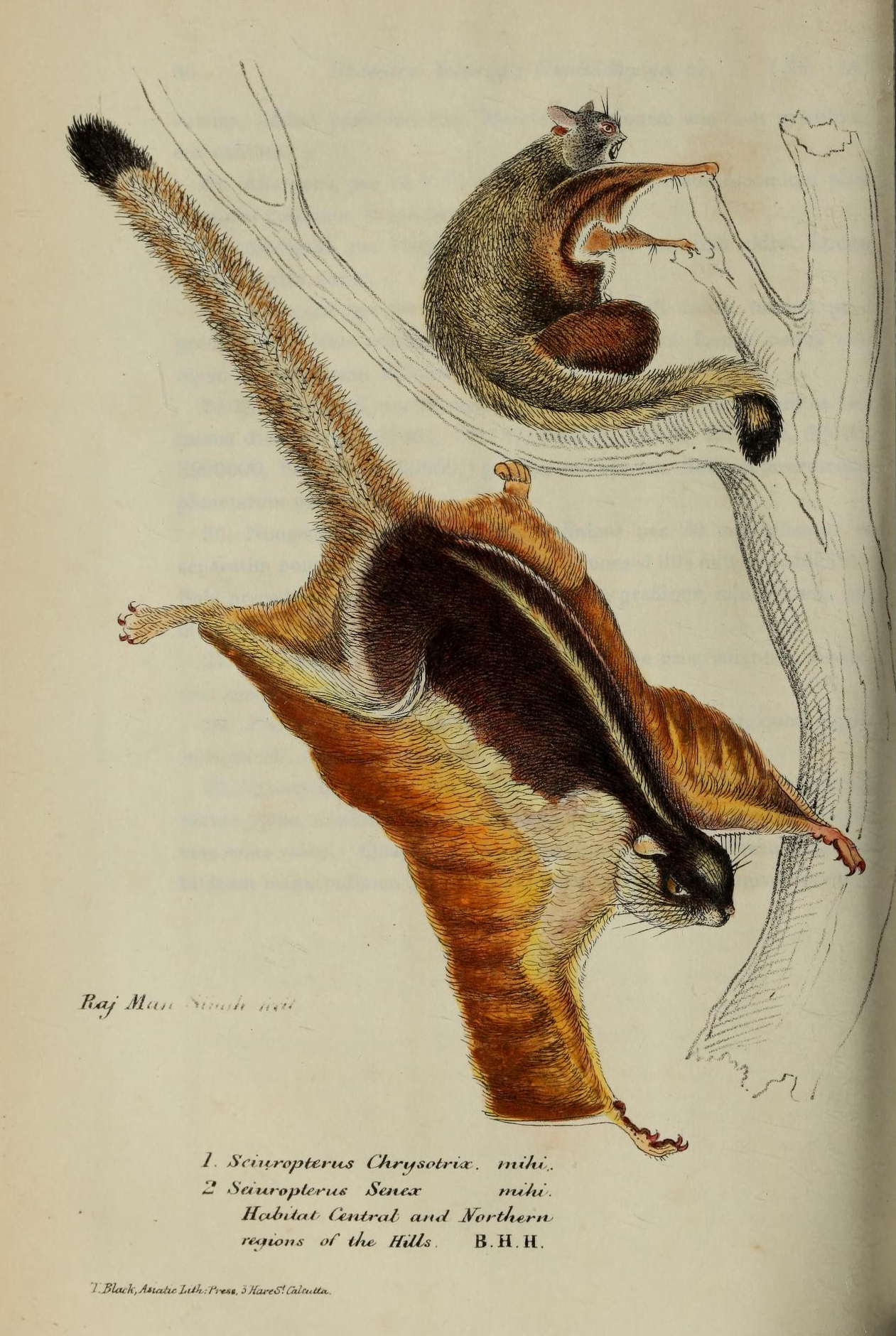
The nominate subspecies of the Bhutan giant flying squirrel, showing the light stripe along its mid-back (a grey-headed giant flying squirrel perched above)

Despite already being scientifically described by John Edward Gray in 1842, the Bhutan giant flying squirrel has often been confused with the Hodgson's giant flying squirrel (Petaurista magnificus), which is found in the same general region. In 1863, Edward Blyth considered the Bhutan giant flying squirrel as a synonym of the Hodgson's giant flying squirrel.

Many—but not all—later sources followed this, and William Thomas Blanford considered the two as seasonal variants of one species, with the Bhutan giant flying squirrel being the "summer form" and the Hodgson's giant flying squirrel being the "winter form". This was repeated by others, even authorities with access to museum specimens showing that neither colour pattern is restricted to a specific season. The situation was further confused by mislabeled museum specimens, including a misidentified Bhutan giant flying squirrel that was recognised as a paratype for the Hodgson's giant flying squirrel in 1918.

Only in the late 1970s and early 1980s was it firmly established that the two species differ both in their colour patterns and size. In addition to its smaller average size (although its tail may be longer) and differences in the skull, the Hodgson's giant flying squirrel has large yellowish-buff shoulder patches that contrast with the deep russet or chestnut flanks, lacks a light stripe along the mid-back, and the light patch on the crown—if present at all—only consists of a spot that occasionally forms a streak.

== Habitat and behavior ==
The natural habitats of the Bhutan giant flying squirrel are subtropical forests, temperate broadleaf forests, rhododendron forests and coniferous forests. Although mostly found between 1,500 and 3,000 m (4,900–9,800 ft) elevation, it has been recorded down to 800 m (2,600 ft).

Little is known about the behavior of the Bhutan giant flying squirrel. It is mostly nocturnal like other flying squirrels, but the species has also been seen at dawn and dusk. The Bhutan giant flying squirrel appears to breed in March and April. Although it generally lives in trees, it has been seen feeding on the ground.

== Conservation status ==
The Bhutan giant flying squirrel is mainly threatened by habitat loss and degradation. To a lesser degree it is threatened by hunting for bushmeat and its pelt, and capture for the local pet trade. The IUCN recognises the species as near threatened, but almost qualifying for vulnerable. It occurs in several reserves.
