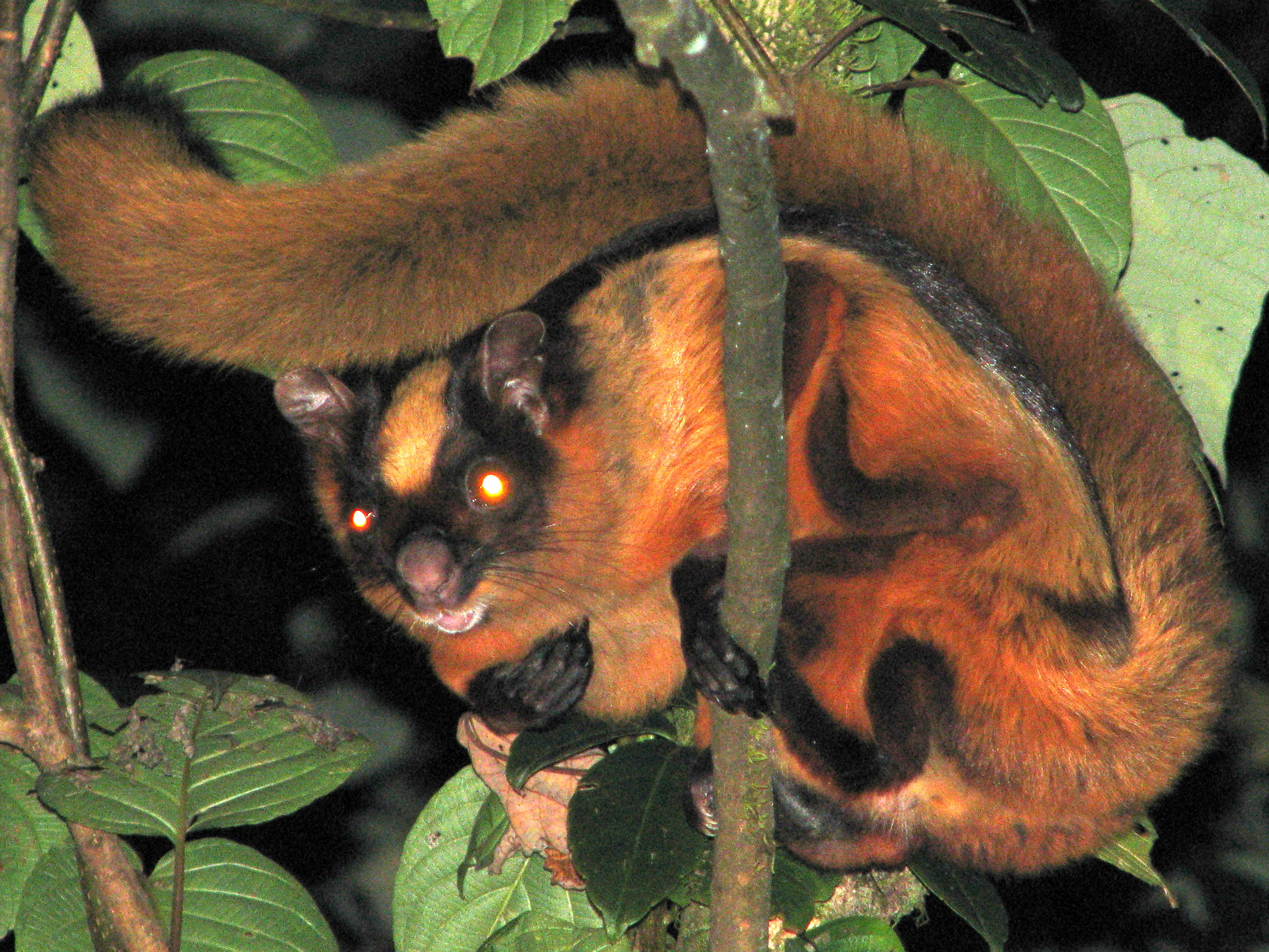
- Bhutan giant flying squirrel (Petaurista nobilis)

Scientific classification
- Kingdom: Animalia
- Phylum: Chordata
- Class: Mammalia
- Order: Rodentia
- Family: Sciuridae
- Tribe: Pteromyini
- Genus: Petaurista; Link, 1795

Type species
- Sciurus petaurista Pallas, 1766

= Petaurista =

Genus of rodents

Petaurista is a genus of rodent in the family Sciuridae. They are large to very large flying squirrels found in forests and other wooded habitats in southern and eastern Asia.

Like other flying squirrels, they are mostly nocturnal and able to glide (not actually fly like a bat) long distances between trees by spreading out their patagium, skin between their limbs. They feed primarily on plant material, but will also take small animals such as insects.

== Taxonomy ==
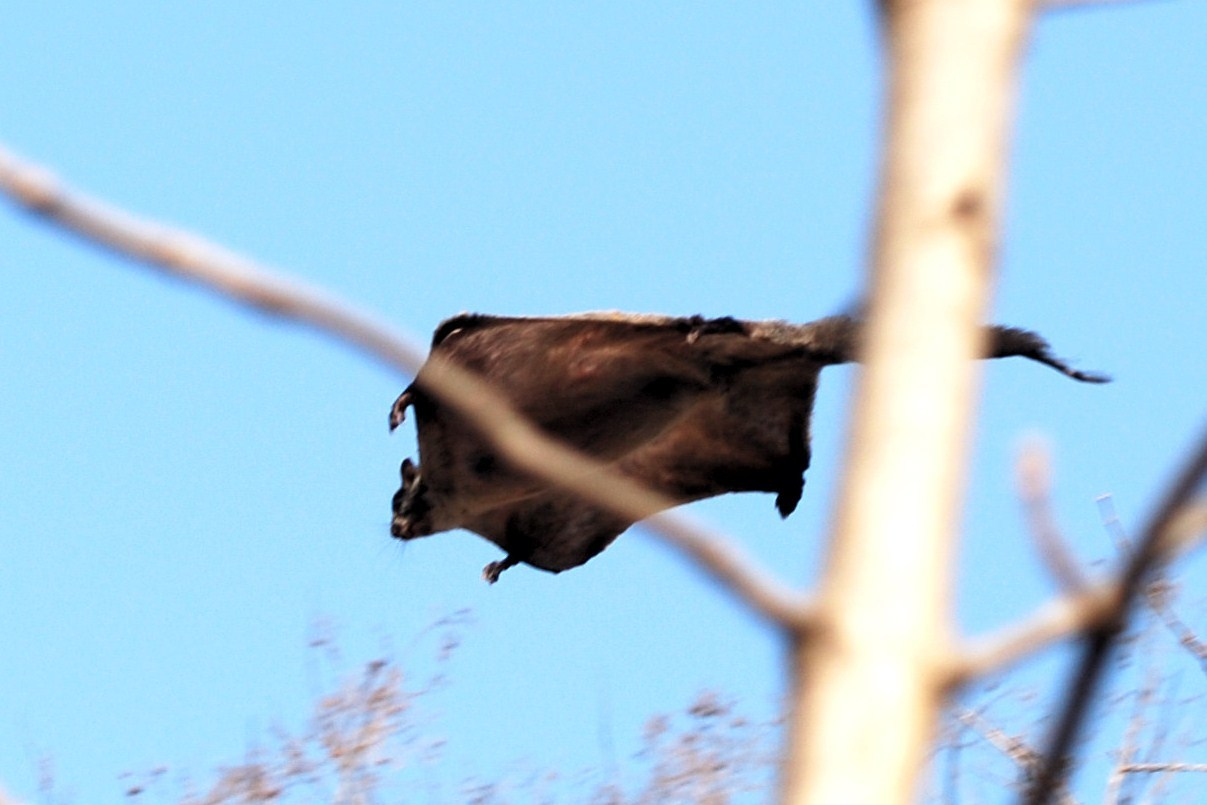
Gliding Indian giant flying squirrel (P. philippensis)

The species level taxonomy is very complex and not fully resolved. In 2005, Mammal Species of the World recognised eight species, but later studies have found that some of these were highly polyphyletic, and recent authorities have often recognised some of the most divergent "subspecies" as valid species. Additionally, three new species were described from northeastern India in 2007–2013, although their validity needs to be confirmed.

=== Living species ===
Eight species were recognised in Mammal Species of the World in 2005:

- Red and white giant flying squirrel, Petaurista alborufus Milne-Edwards, 1870
- Spotted giant flying squirrel, Petaurista elegans Müller, 1840
- Japanese giant flying squirrel, Petaurista leucogenys Temminck, 1827
- Hodgson's giant flying squirrel, Petaurista magnificus Hodgson, 1836
- Bhutan giant flying squirrel, Petaurista nobilis Gray, 1842
- Red giant flying squirrel, Petaurista petaurista Pallas, 1766
- Indian giant flying squirrel, Petaurista philippensis Elliot, 1839
- Chinese giant flying squirrel, Petaurista xanthotis Milne-Edwards, 1872

Seven additional species now often recognised, but traditionally considered subspecies:

- White-bellied giant flying squirrel, Petaurista albiventer Gray, 1834
- Grey-headed giant flying squirrel, Petaurista caniceps Gray, 1842
- Formosan giant flying squirrel, Petaurista grandis Swinhoe, 1863
- Hainan giant flying squirrel, Petaurista hainana G. Allen, 1925
- Taiwan giant flying squirrel, Petaurista lena Thomas, 1907
- Spotted giant flying squirrel, Petaurista marica Thomas, 1912
- Chindwin giant flying squirrel, Petaurista sybilla Thomas and Wroughton, 1916

Three new species that were described by Anwaruddin Choudhury from Arunachal Pradesh in 2007–2013:

- Mechuka giant flying squirrel, Petaurista mechukaensis Choudhury, 2007
- Mishmi giant flying squirrel, Petaurista mishmiensis Choudhury, 2009
- Mebo giant flying squirrel, Petaurista siangensis Choudhury, 2013

=== Extinct species ===
In addition to the living species, there are a few extinct species that only are known from fossil remains from the Mid and Late Pleistocene in China, the Russian Far East and Germany:

- †Petaurista brachyodus Young, 1934
- †Petaurista helleri Dehm, 1962
- †Petaurista tetyukhensis Tiunov & Gimranov, 2019
