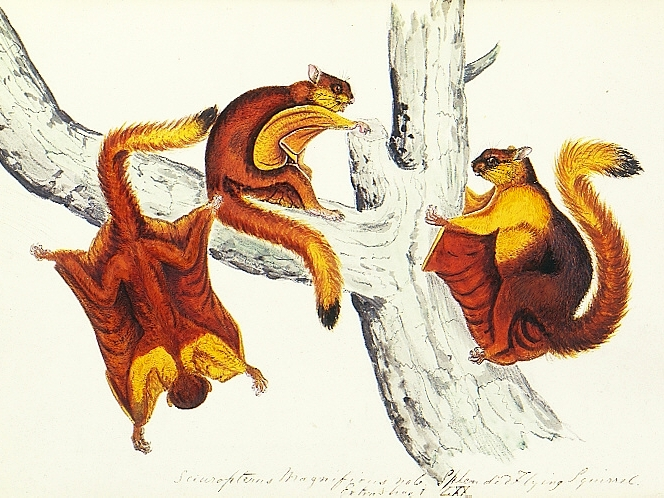
- Three individuals painted for the planned—but never published—book on animals of Nepal by 19th century naturalist B.H. Hodgson

Conservation status
- Least Concern (IUCN 3.1)

Scientific classification
- Kingdom: Animalia
- Phylum: Chordata
- Class: Mammalia
- Order: Rodentia
- Family: Sciuridae
- Genus: Petaurista
- Species: P. magnificus

Binomial name
- Petaurista magnificus (Hodgson, 1836)
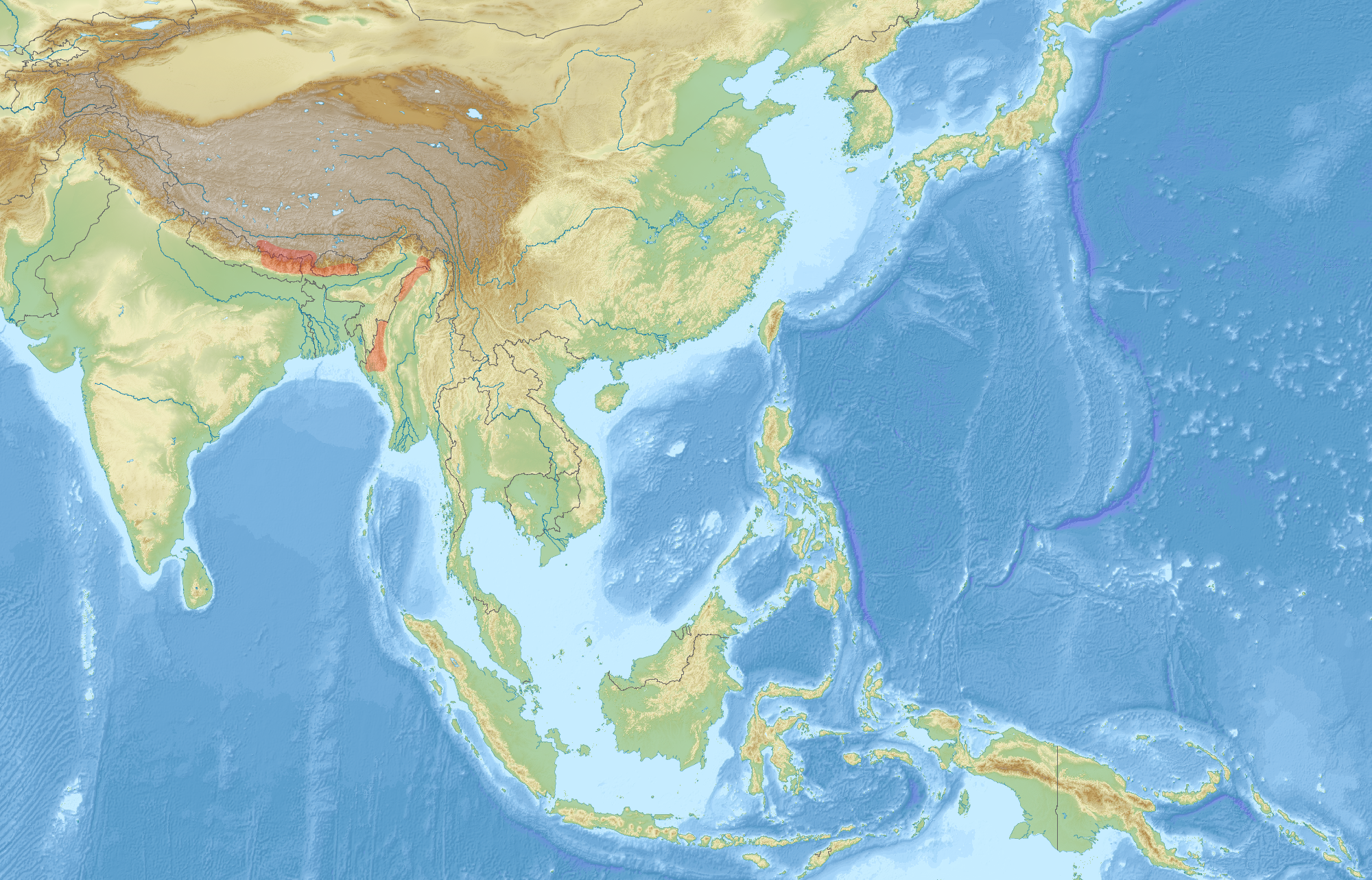
- Range in red as reported by the IUCN, but see text

= Hodgson's giant flying squirrel =

Species of rodent

Hodgson's giant flying squirrel (Petaurista magnificus) is a species of rodent in the family Sciuridae. This large flying squirrel lives in Himalayan forests in Asia. Like other flying squirrels, it is nocturnal and able to glide (not actually fly like a bat) long distances between trees by spreading out its patagium, skin between its limbs.

== Distribution and habitat ==
The Hodgson's giant flying squirrel is native to the Himalayan region where found in Nepal, Bhutan, southern Xizang (Tibet) in China, and the Indian states of Sikkim, far northern West Bengal and much of Arunachal Pradesh. Although also reported from Bangladesh, Myanmar (Burma), and the Indian states of Assam and Meghalaya, its presence south and east of the Indian part of the Brahmaputra (Siang) River is questionable and likely the result of misidentifications of other species of giant flying squirrels. A taxonomic review of all flying squirrels did not include Bangladesh, Myanmar, Assam or Meghalaya as part of the range of the Hodgson's giant flying squirrel, a checklist and distribution review of mammals of India did not include Assam or Meghalaya as part of its range, and a guide to the mammals of Mainland Southeast Asia did not recognise the species as part of the fauna of Myanmar.

The Hodgson's giant flying squirrel occurs at altitudes of between 400 and 3,700 m (1,300–12,100 ft), but it is mostly reported from 1,500 to 2,700 m (4,900–8,900 ft). It is found in tropical forests, subtropical forests and temperate broadleaf forests. Although found in both forests that are deciduous and evergreen, it appears to prefer the former.

== Taxonomy and description ==
The Hodgson's giant flying squirrel was named by Brian Houghton Hodgson in 1836 as Sciuropterus magnificus. It was later moved to the genus Petaurista, along with the other giant flying squirrels. The English name was coined later to honour Hodgson. Hodgson, who has been called the "father of Indian vertebrate zoology", planned on making a major book covering mammals and birds of Nepal, but to his disappointment it was never published. However, the illustrations intended for the book, including one showing three Hodgson's giant flying squirrels, are in the collection of London's Natural History Museum.

Two subspecies have been described: P. m. magnificus (at least in Nepal) and P. m. hodgsoni (at least in Darjeeling; scientific name also honouring Hodgson). The latter has somewhat darker fur and differs in certain cranial measurements. Some authorities recognise both subspecies, while others consider the species monotypic with P. m. hodgsoni being a synonym.

=== Appearance ===
This large flying squirrel has a head-and-body length of about 36–51 cm (14–20 in), a tail length of 41.5–55 cm (16.5–21.5 in) and a weight of c. 1.35–1.8 kg (3.0–4.0 lb). There are some variations in the proportions; some individuals have a longer tail than the head-and-body, but it is shorter in others.

The shoulders of the Hodgson's giant flying squirrel are cream–buff or golden–yellowish. This contrasts clearly with the reddish–chestnut, maroon or russet upperparts, including flanks. The "saddle" region of the back always appears overall dark and it is sometimes mixed with some black hairs, but it can also have some hairs that are white-tipped. The top of the head is dark and connected by dark thin line or broad patch to the dark "saddle". There is typically no obvious light crown patch, but if present it only consists of a yellowish spot that occasionally forms a streak. The underparts are chestnut–orange or orange–buff. The tail is dark brown at the base, the rest being reddish-brown, apart from the tip which is black. The feet are also black.

=== Confusion with Bhutan giant flying squirrel ===
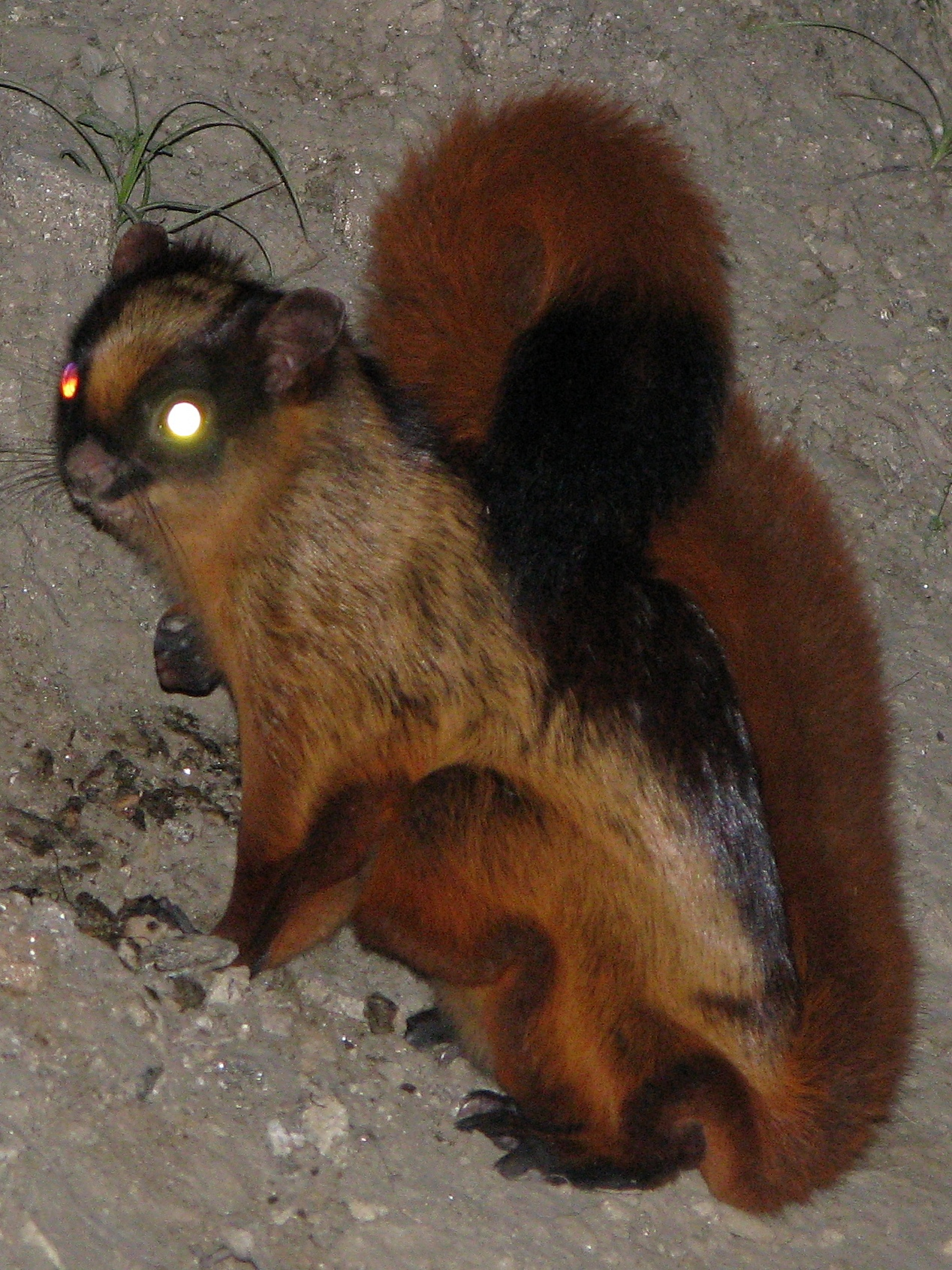
A Bhutan giant flying squirrel, a species often confused with the Hodgson's giant flying squirrel

Despite already being scientifically described by John Edward Gray in 1842, the Bhutan giant flying squirrel (Petaurista nobilis) has often been confused with the Hodgson's giant flying squirrel, which is found in the same general region. In 1863, Edward Blyth considered the Bhutan giant flying squirrel as a synonym of the Hodgson's giant flying squirrel. Many—but not all—later sources followed this and William Thomas Blanford considered the two as seasonal variants of one species, with the Bhutan giant flying squirrel being the "summer form" and the Hodgson's giant flying squirrel being the "winter form". This was repeated by others, even authorities with access to museum specimens showing that neither colour pattern is restricted to a specific season. The situation was further confused by mislabeled museum specimens, including a misidentified Bhutan giant flying squirrel that was recognised as a paratype for the Hodgson's giant flying squirrel in 1918. This confusion was the source of the incorrect reports of "Hodgson's giant flying squirrels" with a light stripe along the mid-back, a claim sometimes still repeated based on the original misunderstanding by Blanford. Only in the late 1970s and early 1980s was it firmly established that the two species differ both in their colour patterns and size. In addition to its larger average size (although its tail may be shorter) and differences in the skull, the Bhutan giant flying squirrel has flanks that are roughly the same colour as the shoulder patches, it often—but not always—has a light stripe along the mid-back, and it often—but not always—has a distinct pale fulvous or orange–buff band/patch on the crown (making the dark top of the head appear rather like a bandit mask).

== Behaviour ==
Hodgson's giant flying squirrel is a nocturnal species. At dusk its booming calls can be heard as it emerges from its daytime hiding place in the canopy. It then glides down from the treetops to the rhododendrons and bushes growing below; the glide may cover a distance of as much as 100 m (330 ft) and terminates with a short upward movement. This squirrel feeds on fruits (especially nuts, chestnuts and acorns), young leaves, buds, flowers, grass, tree resin and insects. It sleeps during the day in a tree hole 5–15 m (15–50 ft) above the ground, lined with soft vegetation and fur. Little is known of its reproductive behaviour, but pregnant females have been recorded in November. There is typically only one young in each litter (as typical of giant flying squirrels), occasionally two.

== Status ==
The total number of Hodgson's giant flying squirrels is thought to be decreasing, but it is found in several protected areas and it is sufficiently widespread to be recognised as least concern by the IUCN. The primary threat is habitat loss and degradation. Secondary threats are hunting for bushmeat and its pelt, and capture for the local pet trade. Captives are generally short-lived. Free-ranging dogs sometimes kill Hodgson's giant flying squirrels.
