= Spotted giant flying squirrel =

Spotted Giant Flying Squirrel
- Petaurista elegans in West Java, Indonesia

Conservation status
- Least Concern (IUCN 3.1)

Scientific classification
- Kingdom: Animalia
- Phylum: Chordata
- Class: Mammalia
- Order: Rodentia
- Family: Sciuridae
- Genus: Petaurista
- Species: P. elegans

Binomial name
- Petaurista elegans (Temminck, 1836)
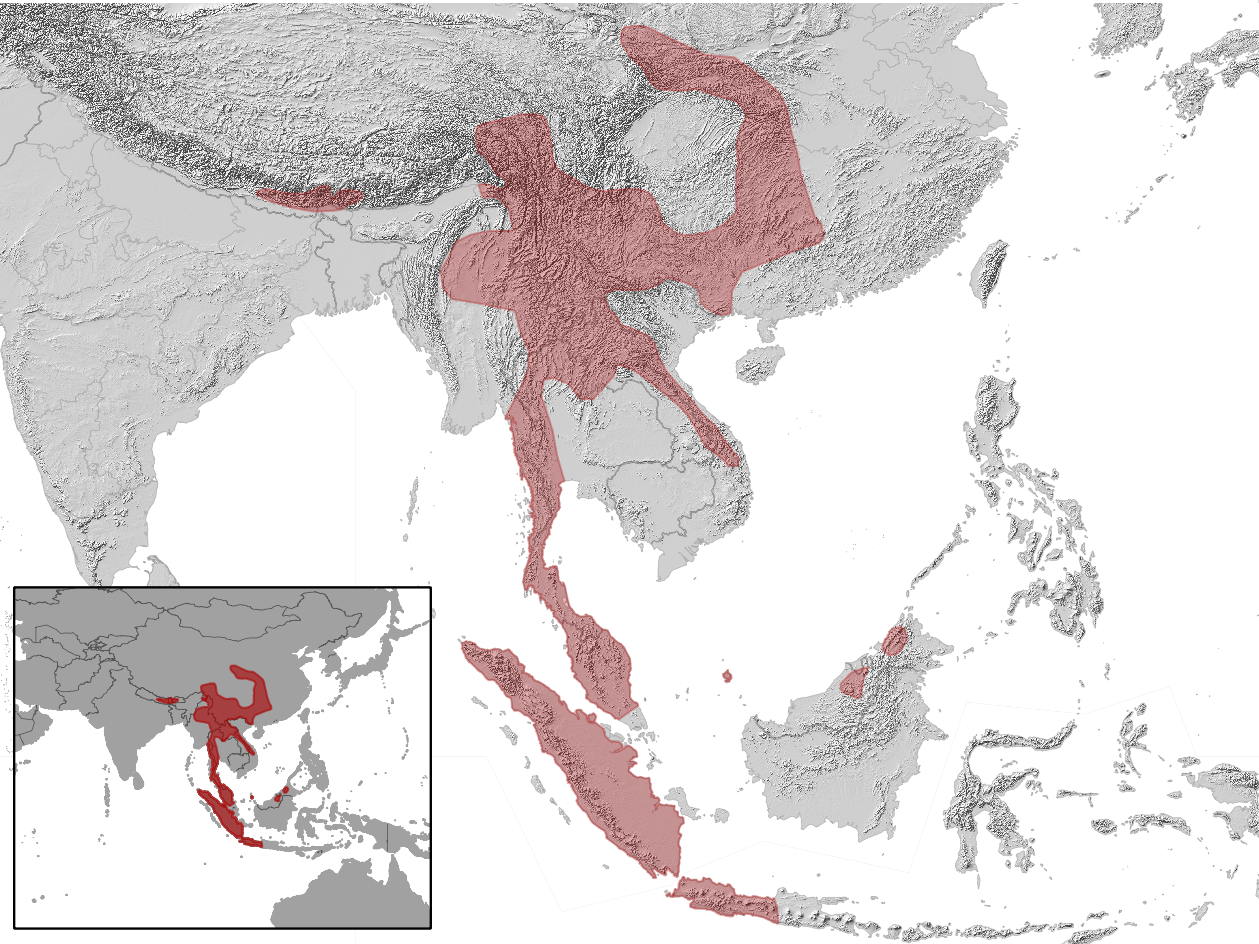

Species of rodent

The spotted giant flying squirrel (Petaurista elegans), also known as the lesser giant flying squirrel, is a species of rodent in the family Sciuridae. It is found in hill and mountain forests at altitudes of 200–4,000 m (660–13,120 ft) in Southeast Asia north to central China and the east Himalayan region, although the northern populations sometimes are regarded as separate species as the grey-headed giant flying squirrel (P. caniceps), Chindwin giant flying squirrel (P. sybilla) and P. marica. Two of these, as well as a few other populations, lack the white spots on the upperparts for which it is named. Although a large flying squirrel, it is a relatively small giant flying squirrel.

Like other flying squirrels, it is nocturnal and able to glide (not actually fly like a bat) long distances between trees by spreading out its patagium, skin between its limbs. A rather noisy species that has a drawn-out cry that often can be heard at night, it spends the day in a tree hollow, or, less often, on a cliff ledge or in a nest made of vegetation in a tree. It feeds on fruits, seeds, leaves, buds and flowers, and has one, occasionally two, young per litter.

== Taxonomy ==
Considerable taxonomic uncertainty surrounds the northern subspecies caniceps, sybilla and marica of the spotted giant flying squirrel. Especially the distinctive caniceps (grey-headed giant flying squirrel) and less often sybilla (Chindwin giant flying squirrel) have been regarded as separate species. In 2005, Mammal Species of the World opted to regard all as subspecies of the spotted giant flying squirrel. In 2012, it was proposed that caniceps should be regarded as a separate species, but with sybilla as its subspecies, while leaving marica as a subspecies of P. elegans. However, in addition to their distinctive appearance, caniceps, sybilla and marica occur together in a small part of southern China. A genetic study has revealed that caniceps is distantly related to all of these, being closer to some other species like the red giant flying squirrel. Although sybilla, marica and P. elegans are closer to each other than they are to any other giant flying squirrel, they are quite deeply split. It is estimated that sybilla split from marica about 1.87 million years ago, and they split from P. elegans even earlier. Another study that compared north Vietnam specimens (either sybilla or marica based on appearance and location) with P. elegans also revealed a relatively deep genetic split between them. This has resulted in the recommendation of recognizing caniceps, sybilla and marica as separate species, but some unresolved issues remain. Both genetic studies were based on P. elegans of the subspecies sumatrana from Sumatra. The subspecies punctata of the Thai-Malay Peninsula has not been sampled. In appearance it quite resembles sumatrana, but intermediates between punctata and marica may occur in the area where their ranges come into contact in Thailand.

A secondary problem is related to certain Chinese and Nepali populations, by some authorities recognize as the subspecies clarkei and gorkhali, but others consider both as synonyms of caniceps. Additionally, populations in the Chinese provinces of Gansu, Guangxi, Hubei, Hunan and Shaanxi appear to belong to two undescribed taxa.

== Appearance ==
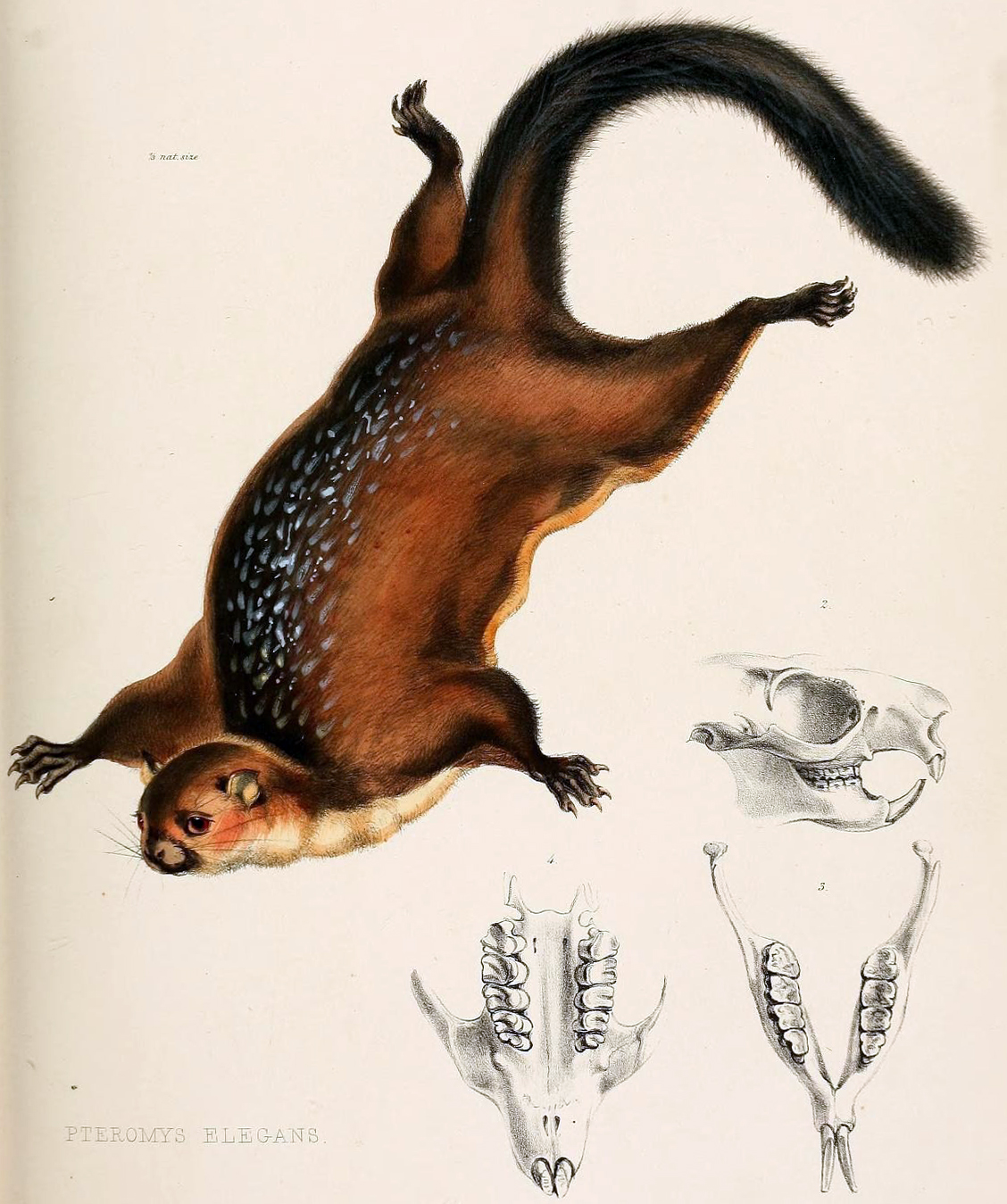
illustration of a spotted giant flying squirrel from "The Zoology of the voyage of H.M.S. Samarang", 1850

The spotted giant flying squirrel has a head-and-body length of about 29.5–40 cm (11.5–15.5 in), tail length of 34–40.5 cm (13.5–16 in) and weighs 760–1,560 g (1.68–3.44 lb). This makes it a large species of flying squirrel, but the smallest giant flying squirrel in its range.

The underparts are light orange-brown to pale rufous, but especially the colour of the head, upperparts and tail vary considerably depending on subspecies. The first group of subspecies has a black tail with only the base rufous-brown. In P. e. punctata of the Thai-Malay Peninsula, the head and upperparts are rufous-brown, somewhat darker on the midback. The upperparts from the top of the head and shoulders to the rump have many relatively large white spots, although on occasion they are more restricted. P. e. banksi of highlands of northern Borneo is similar, except that its upper head, nape and back are black, resulting in a clear contrast with the rich rufous-brown flanks and tail base. It has white spots above as in P. e. punctata, but these can be absent in young. The Sumatran P. e. sumatrana resembles P. e. punctata, but has fewer white spots that mostly are distributed on the mid-back. The Javan P. e. elegans and P. e. slamatensis (the latter likely is a synonym of the former) resemble P. e. banksi, but the upperparts often are more grizzled-black and white spots can be entirely absent.

P. elegans caniceps from Shaanxi, China

The second group of subspecies has an entirely (P. e. marica and P. e. sybilla) or mostly (P. e. caniceps) orangish-brown or reddish-brown tail. P. e. marica from Mainland Southeast Asia (except the Thai-Malay Peninsula) and southern Yunnan and westernmost Guangxi in China is lighter brown above than P. e. punctata and has less white spots that mostly are distributed on the top of the head to the central back. P. e. sybilla of northern Myanmar, southern Sichuan and Yunnan in China and easternmost Arunachal Pradesh in India is orangish-brown or reddish-brown above with a slightly more grey-brown back that completely lacks white spots. The final subspecies, P. e. caniceps from Uttarakhand in India and Nepal to Arunachal Pradesh in India and southern Xizang, Guizhou and Sichuan in China, has a body-colouration similar to P. e. sybilla and also lacks white spots, but is unique in its black tail-tip and all grey head, except for a white throat and an orange-brown ring around each eye.
