= Chinese giant flying squirrel =

Conservation status
- Least Concern (IUCN 3.1)

Scientific classification
- Kingdom: Animalia
- Phylum: Chordata
- Class: Mammalia
- Infraclass: Placentalia
- Order: Rodentia
- Family: Sciuridae
- Genus: Petaurista
- Species: P. xanthotis

Binomial name
- Petaurista xanthotis (A. Milne-Edwards, 1872)
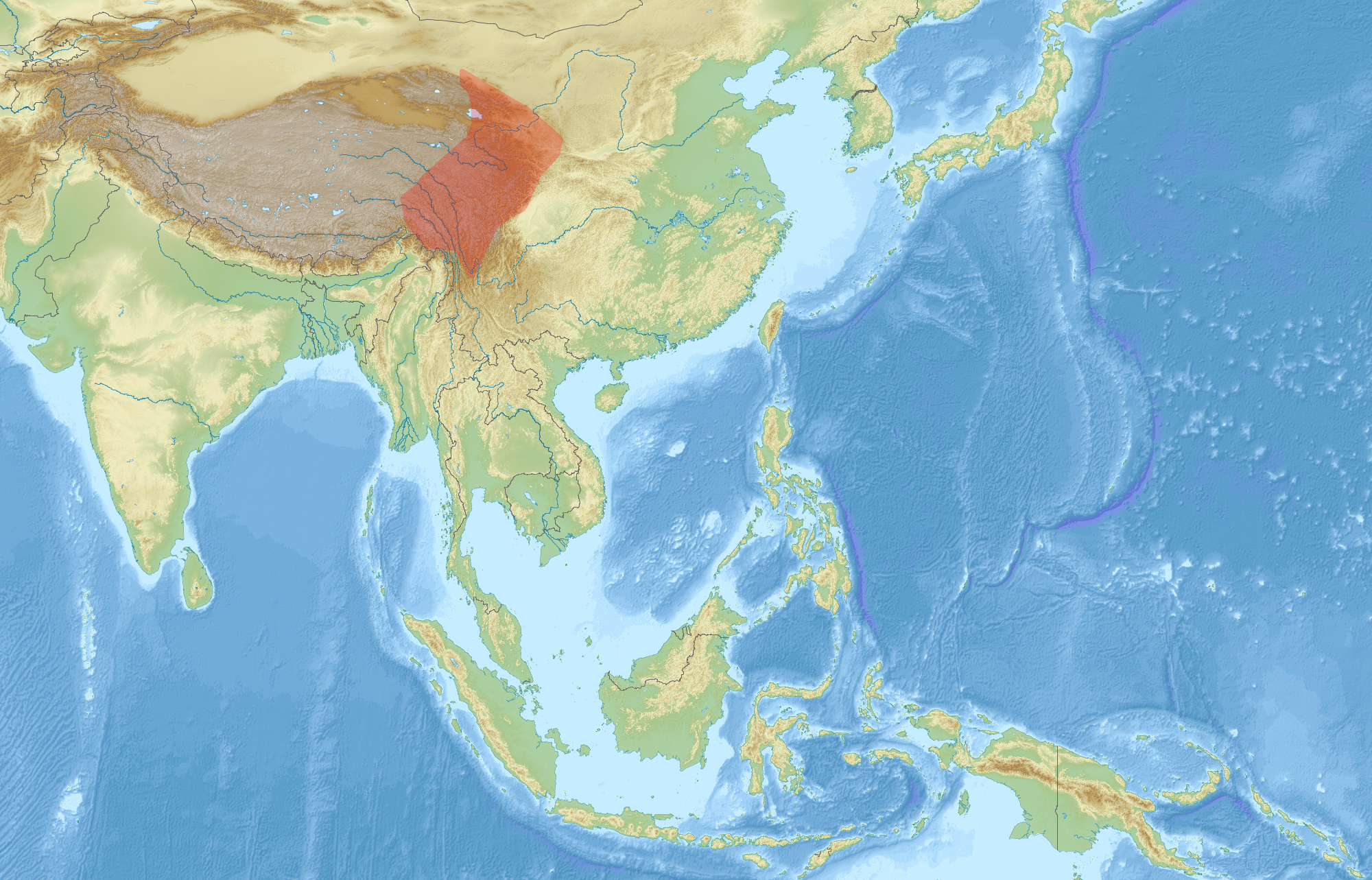

Species of rodent

The Chinese giant flying squirrel (Petaurista xanthotis) is a species of rodent in the family Sciuridae. It is endemic to China. It inhabits high-elevation spruce forests in China and feeds nocturnally on young shoots, leaves, and pine nuts. It nests in trees but does not hibernate. Its litter size averages two.
