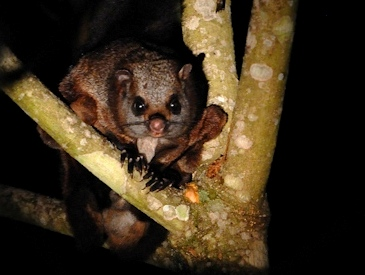

Conservation status
- Least Concern (IUCN 3.1)

Scientific classification
- Kingdom: Animalia
- Phylum: Chordata
- Class: Mammalia
- Order: Rodentia
- Family: Sciuridae
- Genus: Petaurista
- Species: P. philippensis

Binomial name
- Petaurista philippensis (Elliot, 1839)
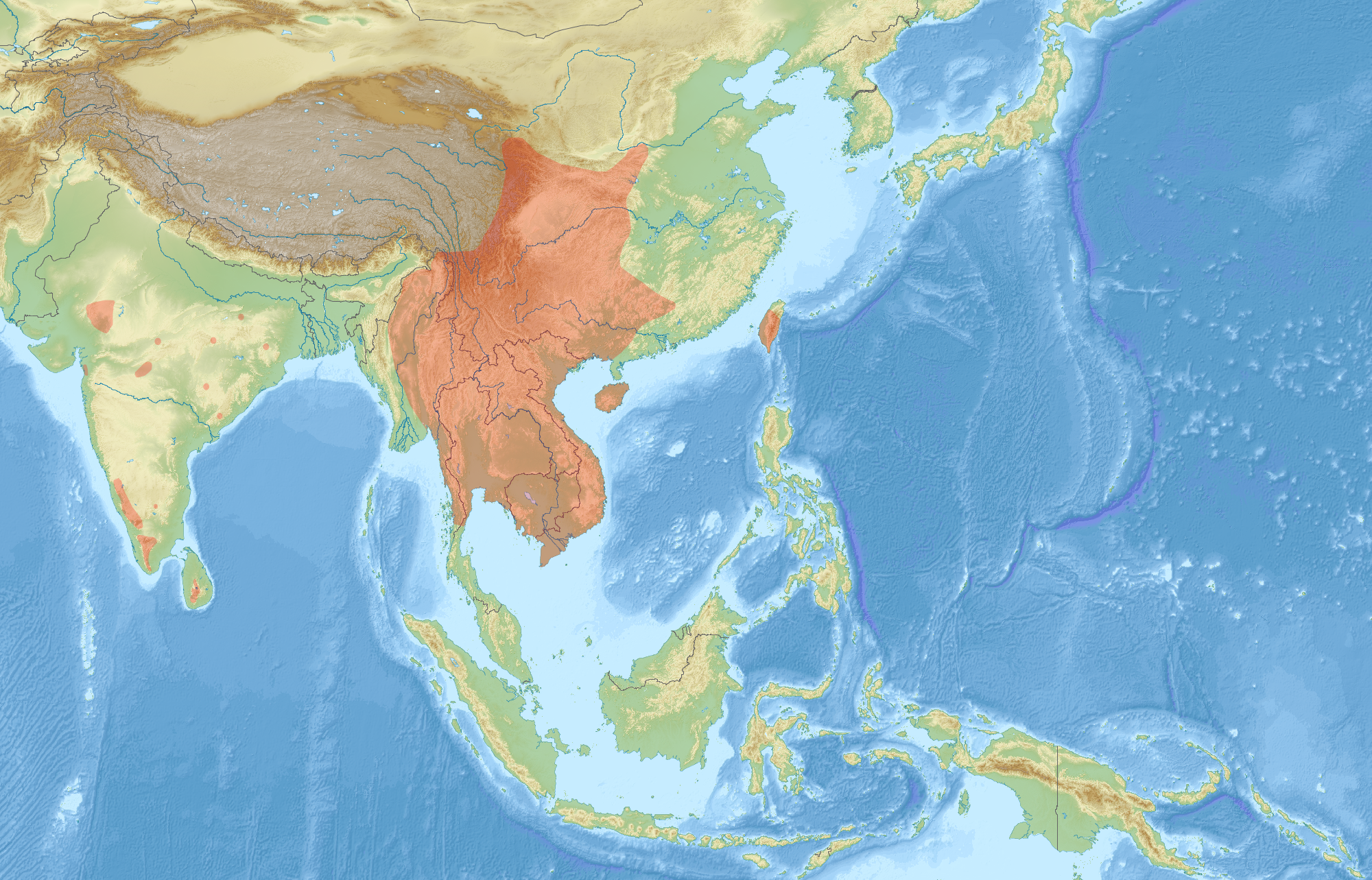
- Range in red as reported by the IUCN, but see text

= Indian giant flying squirrel =

Species of rodent

The Indian giant flying squirrel (Petaurista philippensis), also called the large brown flying squirrel or the common giant flying squirrel, is a species of rodent in the family Sciuridae. It is capable of gliding flight using a skin membrane, the patagium, stretched between front and hind legs. It is found in mainland Southeast and South Asia, and southern and central China.

== Description ==
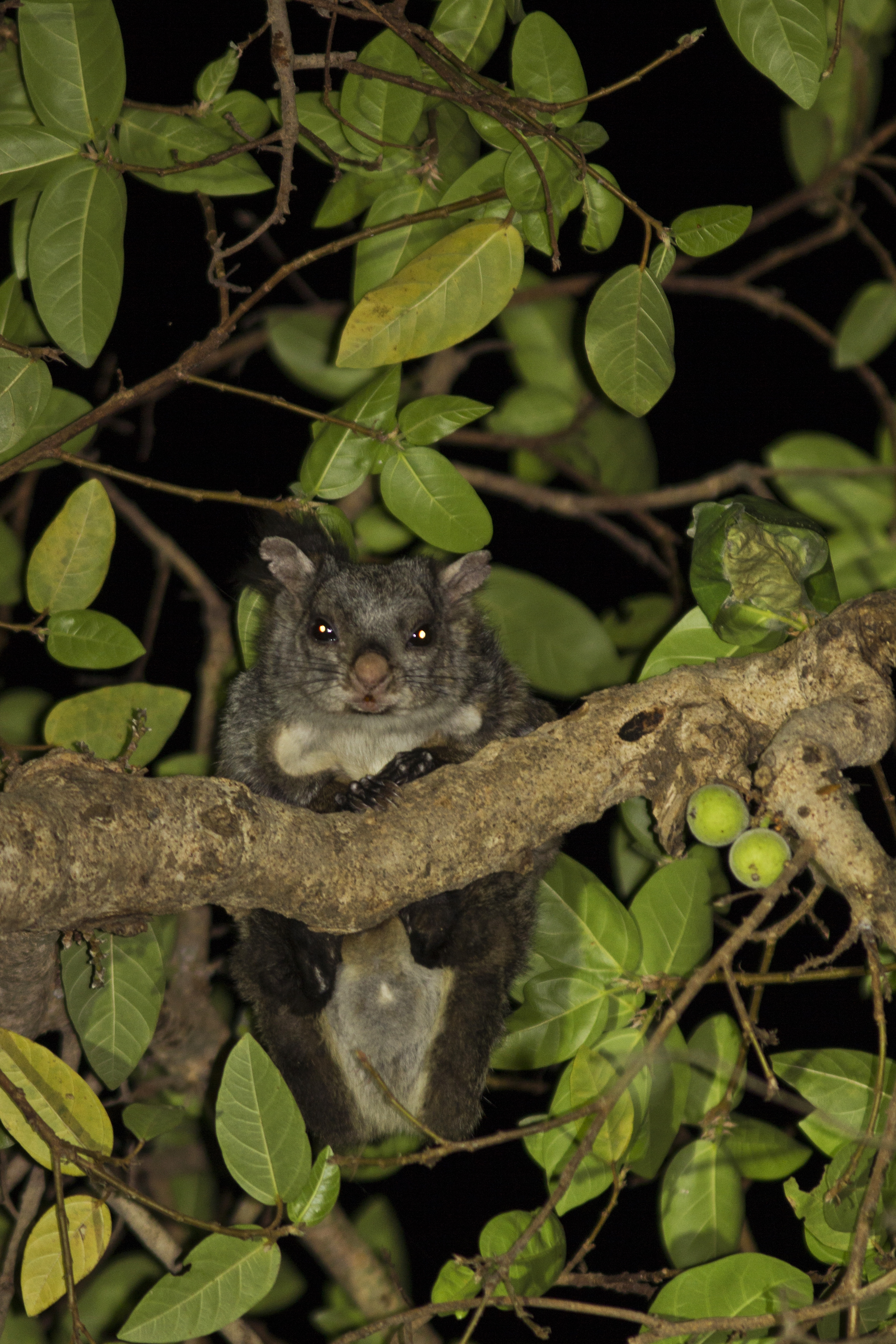
In a Ficus racemosa, in Polo Forest, Sabarkantha, Gujarat, India

This is a large species, with a head and body length of about 43 cm and a tail of 50–52 cm. It has black to gray-brown fur, long and soft on the upper parts and somewhat shorter underneath the body, with a grizzled appearance. A wing membrane between the forelimb and hindlimb, paler coloured underneath, allows gliding between trees. The tail is hairy and blackish to gray-brown, the feet are black, and the nose is pale pink with black vibrissae.

== Taxonomy ==
Its taxonomy is very complex and not fully resolved. Up until the 1980s, some authorities even listed the Indian giant flying squirrel itself as a subspecies of the red giant flying squirrel (P. petaurista). In 2005, Mammal Species of the World included grandis, yunanensis, hainana, nigra, rubicundus and rufipes (last four as synonyms of yunanensis) in the Indian giant flying squirrel. Later studies have confirmed that all these are distinct and not closely related to the Indian giant flying squirrel; placing them together would result in a strongly polyphyletic "species". As a consequence, recent authorities have generally recognized them as part of the red giant flying squirrel or as their own species; the Formosan giant flying squirrel (P. grandis) of Taiwan, Hainan giant flying squirrel (P. hainana) of Hainan, and Yunnan giant flying squirrel (P. yunanensis) in northeastern India, south-central China, Myanmar, northern Laos and northern Vietnam (the extent of its range in the last three countries is labelled with considerable uncertainty). The Formosan and Hainan giant flying squirrels have fully separate ranges, but the Yunnan giant flying squirrel is sympatric with the Indian giant flying squirrel.

In 1900, a new subspecies called Petaurista philippensis lylei was discovered and named after Harold Lyle, the British consul in Nan, by J. Lewis Bonhote who originally classified it as its own species.

== Distribution and habitat ==
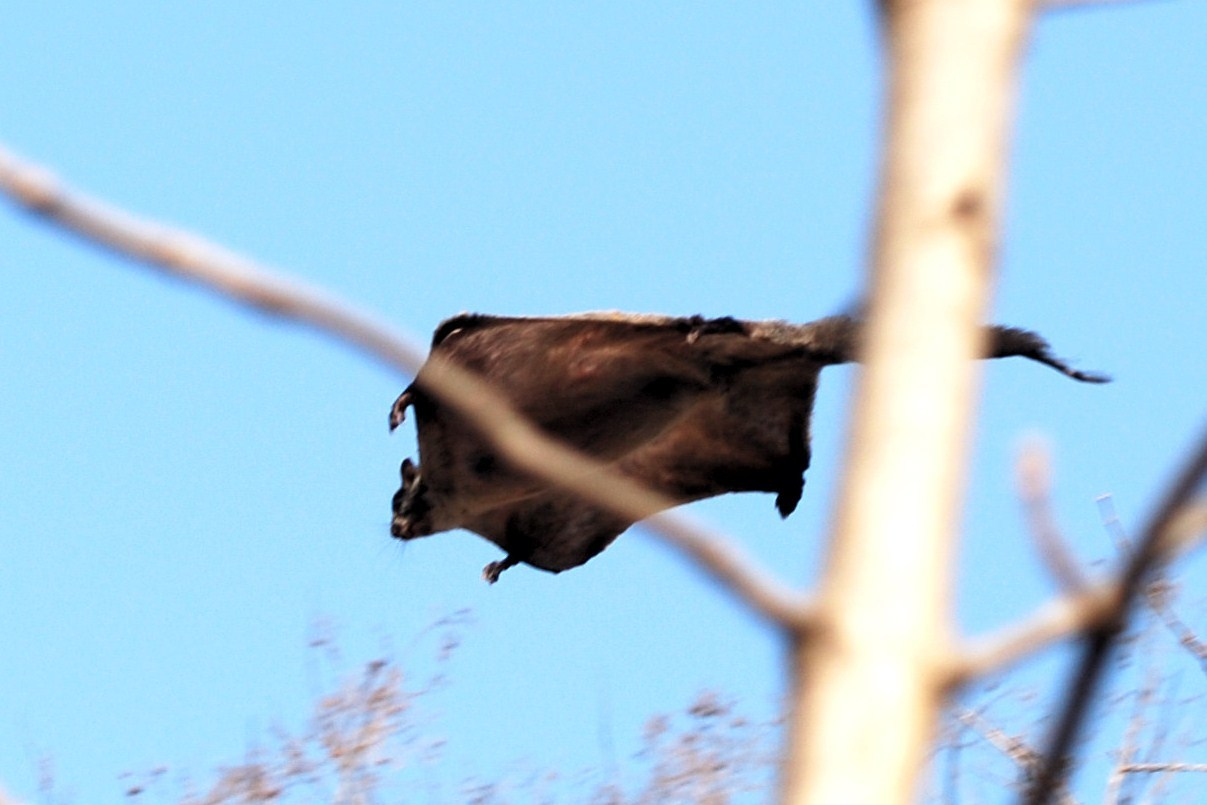
In the Ratanmahal Sloth Bear Sanctuary, Dahod, Central Gujarat, India

The species is native to China, India, Laos, Myanmar, Sri Lanka, Taiwan, Thailand, and Vietnam. It inhabits dry deciduous and evergreen forest, usually at higher elevations from 500–2,000 m (1,600–6,600 ft) and has been recorded on plantations.

== Ecology ==
The Indian giant flying squirrel is nocturnal and arboreal, spending most of its life in the canopy. Nests are made in tree hollows lined with bark, fur, moss, and leaves. The species is sociable when food is abundant, but intraspecies attacks increase with food scarcity. Vocalizations are similar to those of the spot-bellied eagle-owl.

== Diet ==
The species is mainly frugivorous, preferring the fruits of Ficus racemosa, followed by Cullenia and Artocarpus heterophyllus. It also takes bark, tree resins, shoots, leaves (particularly of F. racemosa), insects, and larvae. Squirrels were shown to be somewhat tolerant of disturbance when foraging, and to exploit food resources at the forest edge, including exotic planted species.

== Reproduction ==
Female gives birth to a single offspring during mid June. Pups are born blind, with a head that is disproportionately large when compared with the body.

== See also ==
- Indian giant squirrel
