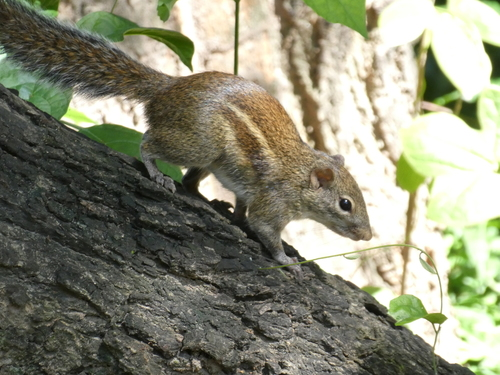

Conservation status
- Least Concern (IUCN 3.1)

Scientific classification
- Kingdom: Animalia
- Phylum: Chordata
- Class: Mammalia
- Order: Rodentia
- Family: Sciuridae
- Subfamily: Callosciurinae
- Genus: Menetes; Thomas, 1908
- Species: M. berdmorei

Binomial name
- Menetes berdmorei (Blyth, 1849)
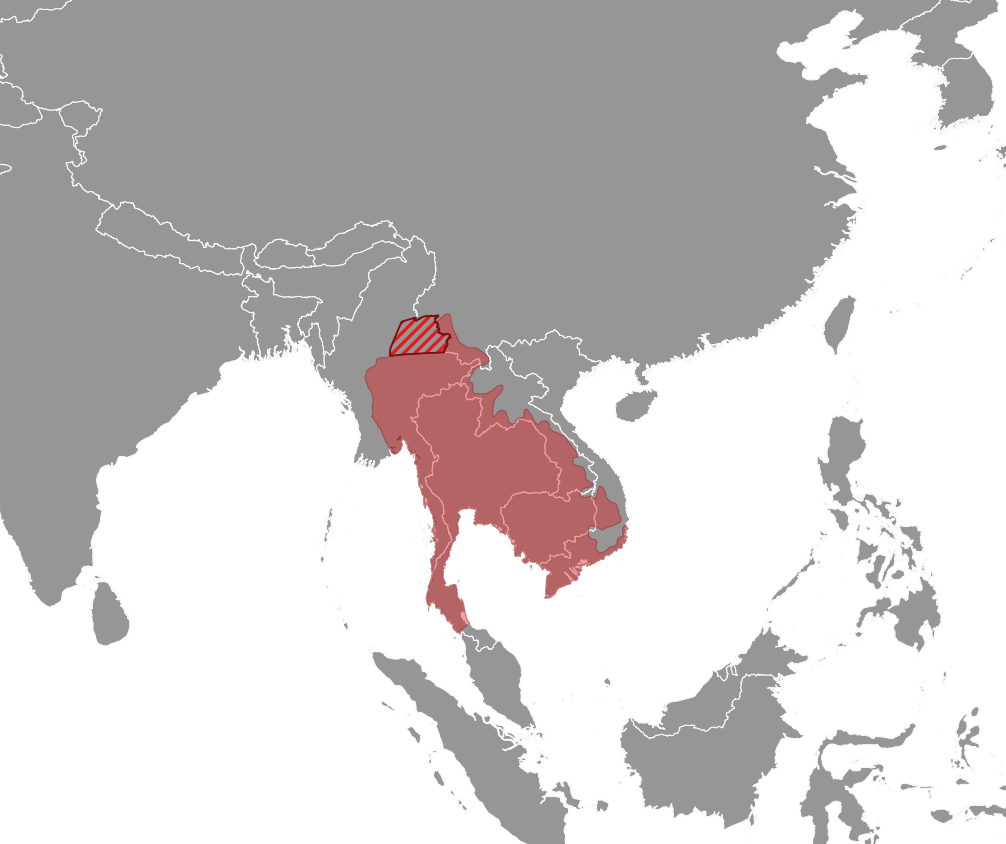

Synonyms
- Sciurus berdmorei Blyth, 1849

= Berdmore's ground squirrel =

Species of rodent

Berdmore's ground squirrel, Indochinese ground squirrel, or Berdmore's squirrel (Menetes berdmorei) is a ground squirrel found in Southeast Asia, from the east of Myanmar and Yunnan (southern China) to Vietnam and Cambodia.

The squirrel has a grey-brown back and a white belly. Most striking are stripes on the side - on each side one beige and below a black stripe. The head is pointy, so this squirrel resembles a mouse or a treeshrew. Its length is 20 cm (7.9 in), not including the 15 cm (5.9 in) long tail.

As a ground squirrel, it is rarely found on trees, but spends most of the time in the thick underwoods of the rainforests. However, it is also found in fields or villages, especially in rice fields it is sometimes omnipresent. Despite it being quite common only very little is known about the life of this squirrel. Despite its name, it is not a close relative of the ground squirrels of the tribe Marmotini
