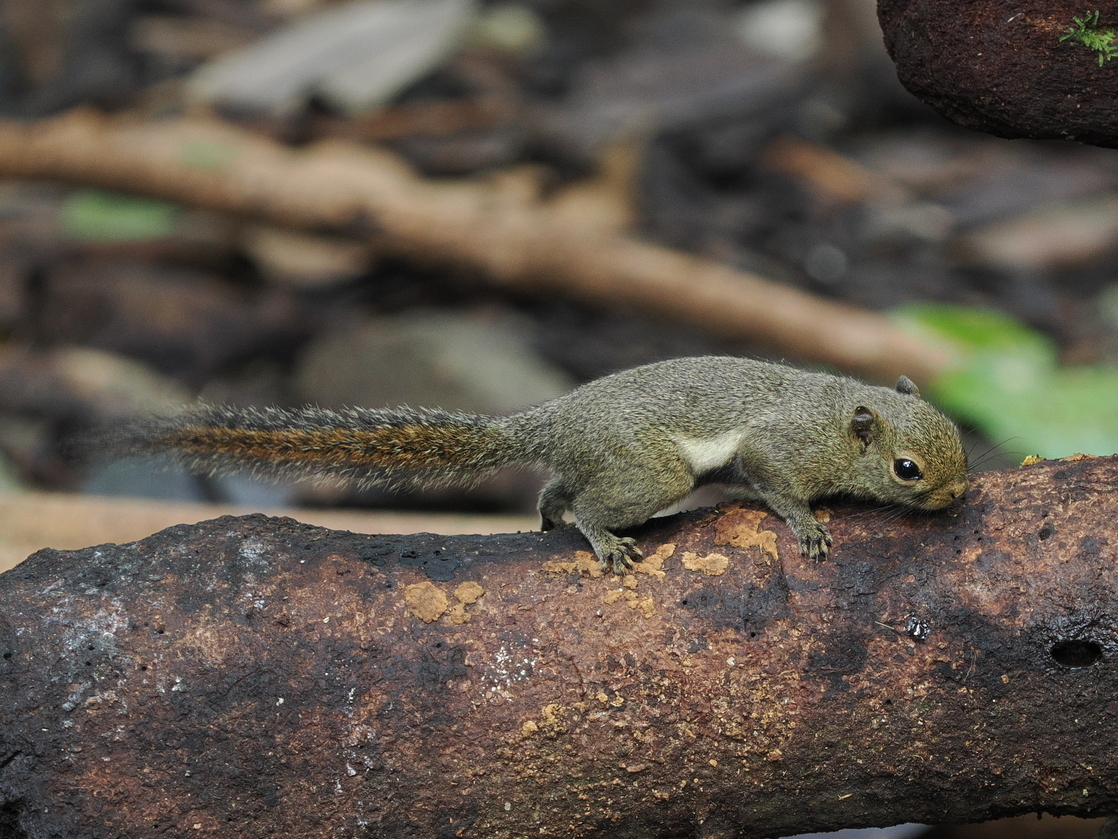

Conservation status
- Data Deficient (IUCN 3.1)

Scientific classification
- Kingdom: Animalia
- Phylum: Chordata
- Class: Mammalia
- Order: Rodentia
- Family: Sciuridae
- Subfamily: Callosciurinae
- Genus: Glyphotes; Thomas, 1898
- Species: G. simus

Binomial name
- Glyphotes simus Thomas, 1898

= Sculptor squirrel =

Species of rodent

The sculptor squirrel or Bornean pygmy squirrel (Glyphotes simus) is a species of rodent in the family Sciuridae. It was described by Michael Rogers Oldfield Thomas in 1898. It is monotypic within the genus Glyphotes. It is endemic to northern Borneo in Sabah and Sarawak (Malaysia) and inhabits areas elevated at 285–1,800 metres (935–5,906 ft).

The body is 95 to 145 millimetres (3.7 to 5.7 in) long, and the tail length is approximately 100 mm. The chest, undersurface, sides of the nose, margins of the ears and dorsal surface of the digits are yellow, whereas the tip of the tail is black.
