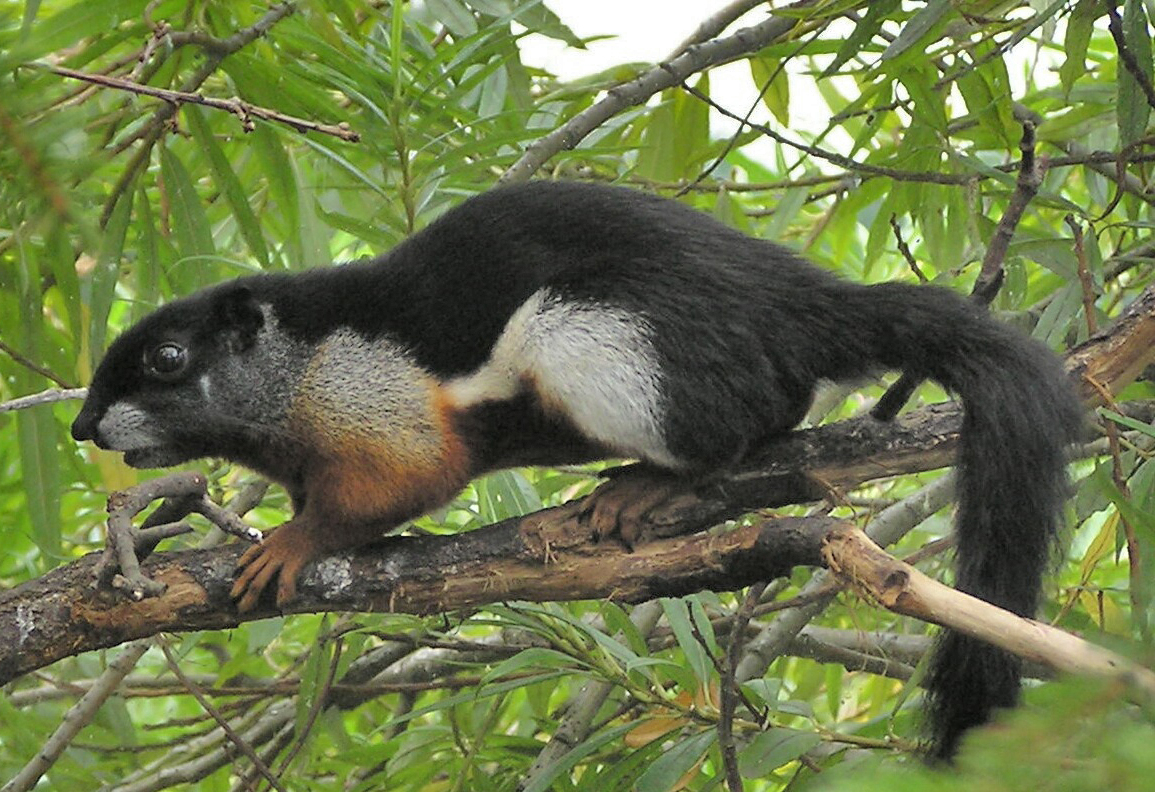
- Prevost's squirrel (Callosciurus prevostii)

Scientific classification
- Kingdom: Animalia
- Phylum: Chordata
- Class: Mammalia
- Order: Rodentia
- Family: Sciuridae
- Subfamily: Callosciurinae; Pocock, 1923

Genera
- Callosciurus; Dremomys; Exilisciurus; Funambulus; Glyphotes; Hyosciurus; Lariscus; Menetes; Nannosciurus; Prosciurillus; Rhinosciurus; Rubrisciurus; Sundasciurus; Tamiops

= Callosciurinae =

Callosciurinae Temporal range: Late Pliocene to recent

Subfamily of rodents

The Callosciurinae are an Asiatic subfamily of squirrels containing over 60 species (mostly found in South East Asia) named after the genus Callosciurus, which means "beautiful squirrels".

== Classification ==
- Family Sciuridae
  - Subfamily Callosciurinae
    - Tribe Callosciurini
      - Callosciurus – Beautiful squirrels (15 species)
      - Dremomys – Red-cheeked squirrels or Asian montane squirrels (six species)
      - Exilisciurus – Asian pygmy squirrels (three species)
      - Glyphotes – sculptor squirrel
      - Hyosciurus – Long-nosed squirrels (two species)
      - Lariscus – Striped ground squirrels (four species)
      - Menetes – Berdmore's ground squirrel or Indochinese ground squirrel
      - Nannosciurus – Black-eared pygmy squirrel
      - Prosciurillus– Dwarf squirrels or Sulawesi tree squirrels (five species)
      - Rhinosciurus – Shrew-faced squirrel
      - Rubrisciurus – Red-bellied squirrel or Sulawesi giant squirrel
      - Sundasciurus – Sunda tree squirrels (two subgenera, 15 species)
      - Tamiops – Asiatic striped squirrels (four species)
    - Tribe Funambulini
      - Funambulus – palm squirrels (two subgenera, five species)
