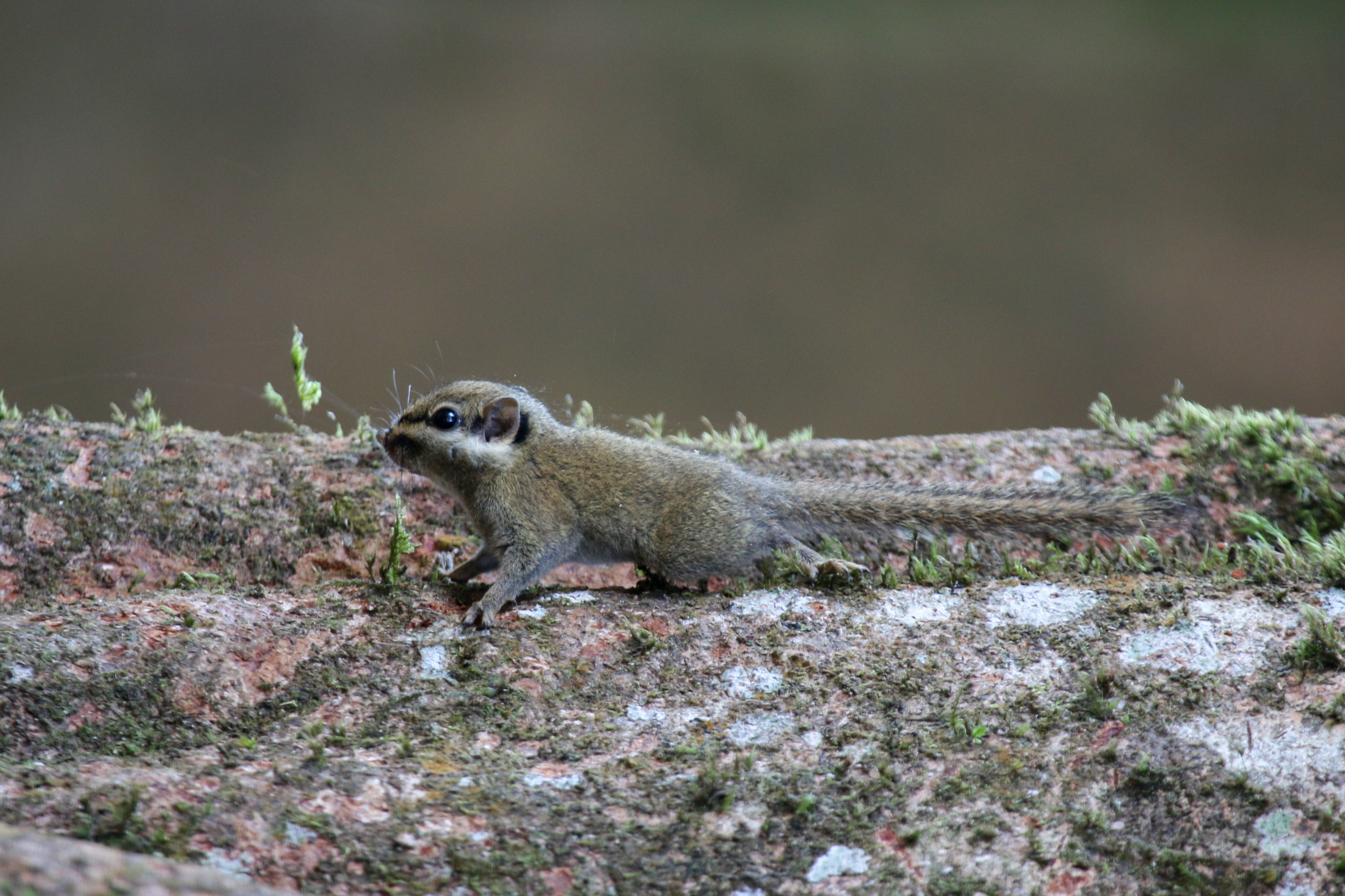

Conservation status
- Least Concern (IUCN 3.1)

Scientific classification
- Kingdom: Animalia
- Phylum: Chordata
- Class: Mammalia
- Order: Rodentia
- Family: Sciuridae
- Subfamily: Callosciurinae
- Genus: Nannosciurus; Trouessart, 1880
- Species: N. melanotis

Binomial name
- Nannosciurus melanotis (S. Müller, 1840)

Subspecies
- N. m. melanotis; N. m. bancanus; N. m. borneanus; N. m. pulcher

= Black-eared squirrel =

Species of rodent

The black-eared squirrel (Nannosciurus melanotis) is a species of rodent in the family Sciuridae. It is monotypic within the genus Nannosciurus. This tiny squirrel is found in forests in Borneo, Sumatra and Java. Except for its striking whitish and black facial markings, the black-eared squirrel resembles the least pygmy squirrel.
