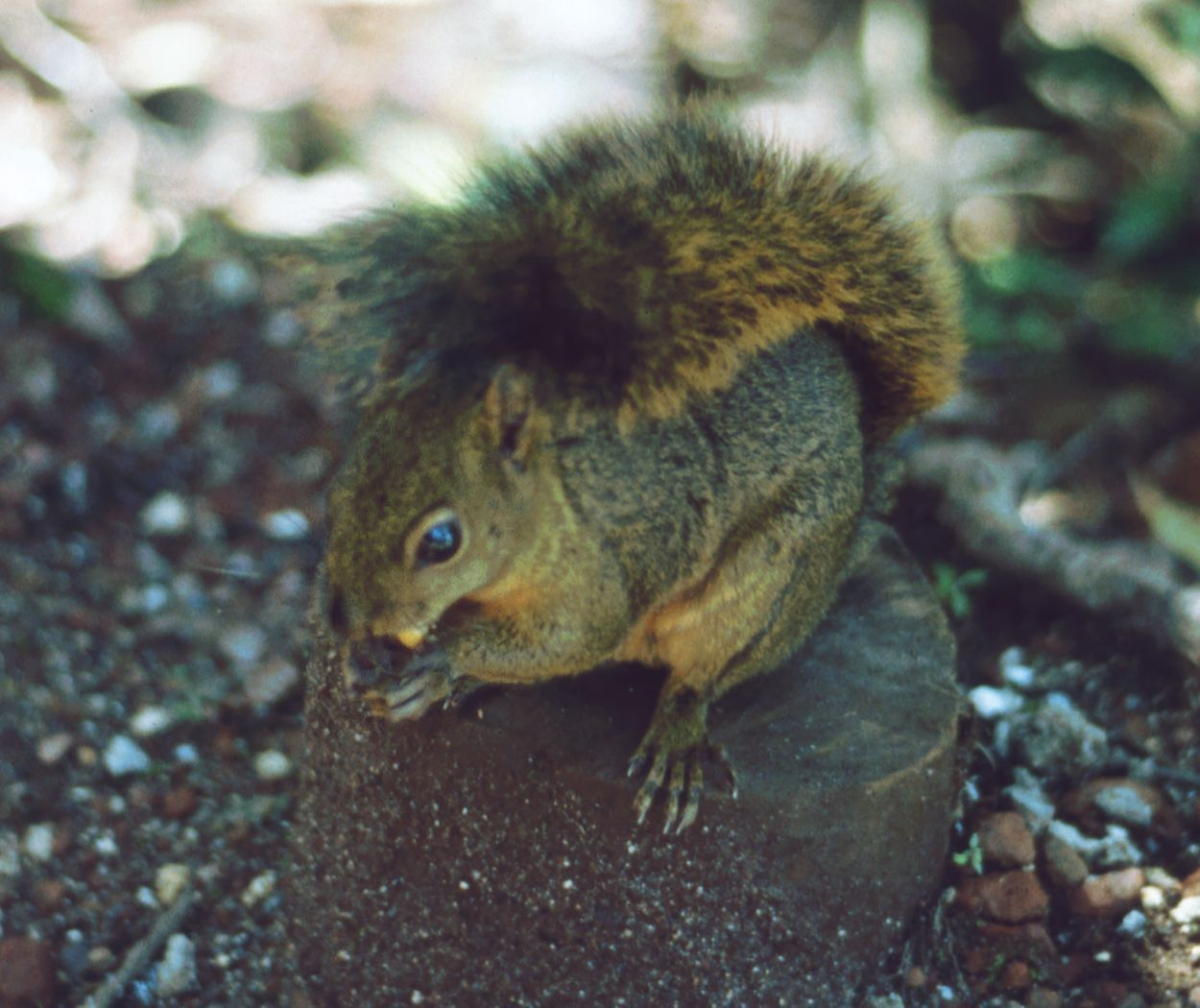
- Syntheosciurus brochus

Scientific classification
- Kingdom: Animalia
- Phylum: Chordata
- Class: Mammalia
- Infraclass: Placentalia
- Order: Rodentia
- Family: Sciuridae
- Subfamily: Sciurinae; Hemprich, 1820

Genera
- †Eopetes; †Junggarisciurus; Tribe Sciurini; Microsciurus; Rheithrosciurus; Sciurus; Syntheosciurus; Tamiasciurus; Tribe Pteromyini; Aeretes; Aeromys; Belomys; Biswamoyopterus; Eoglaucomys; Eupetaurus; Glaucomys; Hylopetes; Iomys; Petaurillus; Petaurista; Petinomys; Pteromys; Pteromyscus; Trogopterus

= Sciurinae =

Sciurinae Temporal range: Late Eocene - recent

Subfamily of rodents

Sciurinae (/sɪˈjuːrɪneɪ/) is a subfamily of squirrels (in the family Sciuridae), uniting the flying squirrels with certain related tree squirrels. Older sources place the flying squirrels in a separate subfamily (Pteromyinae) and unite all remaining sciurids into the subfamily Sciurinae, but this has been strongly refuted by genetic studies.

== Classification ==
Subfamily Sciurinae

- Tribe Sciurini
  - Genus Microsciurus – American dwarf squirrels
    - Central American dwarf squirrel, M. alfari
    - Amazon dwarf squirrel, M. flaviventer
    - Western dwarf squirrel, M. mimulus
    - Santander dwarf squirrel, M. santanderensis
  - Genus Rheithrosciurus
    - Tufted ground squirrel, R. macrotis
  - Genus Sciurus
    - Subgenus Sciurus
      - Allen's squirrel, S. alleni
      - Arizona gray squirrel, S. arizonensis
      - Mexican gray squirrel, S. aureogaster
      - Eastern gray squirrel, S. carolinensis
      - Collie's squirrel, S. colliaei
      - Deppe's squirrel, S. deppei
      - Japanese squirrel, S. lis
      - Calabrian black squirrel, S. meridionalis
      - Mexican fox squirrel, S. nayaritensis
      - Fox squirrel, S. niger
      - Peters's squirrel, S. oculatus
      - Variegated squirrel, S. variegatoides
      - Eurasian red squirrel, S. vulgaris
      - Yucatan squirrel, S. yucatanensis
    - Subgenus Otosciurus
      - Abert's squirrel, S. aberti
    - Subgenus Guerlinguetus
      - Brazilian squirrel or Guianan squirrel, S. aestuans
      - Yellow-throated squirrel, S. gilvigularis
      - Red-tailed squirrel, S. granatensis
      - Bolivian squirrel, S. ignitus
      - Andean squirrel, S. pucheranii
      - Richmond's squirrel, S. richmondi
      - Sanborn's squirrel, S. sanborni
      - Guayaquil squirrel, S. stramineus
    - Subgenus Tenes
      - Persian squirrel, S. anomalus
    - Subgenus Hadrosciurus
      - Fiery squirrel, S. flammifer
      - Junín red squirrel, S. pyrrhinus
    - Subgenus Hesperosciurus
      - Western gray squirrel, S. griseus
    - Subgenus Urosciurus
      - Northern Amazon red squirrel, S. igniventris
      - Southern Amazon red squirrel, S. spadiceus
  - Genus Syntheosciurus
    - Bangs's mountain squirrel, S. brochus
  - Genus Tamiasciurus - pine squirrels
    - Douglas squirrel, T. douglasii
    - Southwestern red squirrel T. fremonti
    - American red squirrel, T. hudsonicus
    - Mearns's squirrel, T. mearnsi
- Tribe Pteromyini – flying squirrels
  - Subtribe Glaucomyina
    - Genus Eoglaucomys
      - Kashmir flying squirrel, E. fimbriatus
    - Genus Glaucomys – New World flying squirrels
      - Southern flying squirrel, G. volans
      - Northern flying squirrel, G. sabrinus
      - Humboldt's flying squirrel, G. oregonensis
    - Genus Hylopetes
      - Particolored flying squirrel, H. alboniger
      - Afghan flying squirrel, H. baberi
      - Bartel's flying squirrel, H. bartelsi
      - Gray-cheeked flying squirrel, H. lepidus
      - Palawan flying squirrel, H. nigripes
      - Indochinese flying squirrel, H. phayrei
      - Jentink's flying squirrel, H. platyurus
      - Sipora flying squirrel, H. sipora
      - Red-cheeked flying squirrel, H. spadiceus
      - Sumatran flying squirrel, H. winstoni
    - Genus Iomys
      - Javanese flying squirrel, I. horsfieldi
      - Mentawi flying squirrel, I. sipora
    - Genus Petaurillus – pygmy flying squirrels
      - Lesser pygmy flying squirrel, P. emiliae
      - Hose's pygmy flying squirrel, P. hosei
      - Selangor pygmy flying squirrel, P. kinlochii
    - Genus Petinomys
      - Basilan flying squirrel, P. crinitus
      - Travancore flying squirrel, P. fuscocapillus
      - Whiskered flying squirrel, P. genibarbis
      - Hagen's flying squirrel, P. hageni
      - Siberut flying squirrel, P. lugens
      - Mindanao flying squirrel, P. mindanensis
      - Arrow flying squirrel, P. sagitta
      - Temminck's flying squirrel, P. setosus
      - Vordermann's flying squirrel, P. vordermanni
  - Subtribe Pteromyina
    - Genus Aeretes
      - Groove-toothed flying squirrel, A. melanopterus
    - Genus Aeromys – large black flying squirrels
      - Black flying squirrel, A. tephromelas
      - Thomas's flying squirrel, A. thomasi
    - Genus Belomys
      - Hairy-footed flying squirrel, B. pearsonii
    - Genus Biswamoyopterus
      - Namdapha flying squirrel, B. biswasi
      - Laotian giant flying squirrel, B. laoensis
      - Mount Gaoligong flying squirrel, B. gaoligongensis
    - Genus Eupetaurus
      - Western woolly flying squirrel, Eupetaurus cinereus
      - Yunnan woolly flying squirrel, Eupetaurus nivamons
      - Tibetan woolly flying squirrel, Eupetaurus tibetensis
    - Genus Petaurista
      - Red and white giant flying squirrel, P. alborufus
      - Spotted giant flying squirrel, P. elegans
      - Hodgson's giant flying squirrel, P. magnificus
      - Bhutan giant flying squirrel, P. nobilis
      - Indian giant flying squirrel, P. philippensis
      - Chinese giant flying squirrel, P. xanthotis
      - Japanese giant flying squirrel, P. leucogenys
      - Red giant flying squirrel, P. petaurista
    - Genus Pteromys – Old World flying squirrel
      - Siberian flying squirrel, P. volans
      - Japanese dwarf flying squirrel, P. momonga
    - Genus Pteromyscus
      - Smoky flying squirrel, P. pulverulentus
    - Genus Trogopterus
      - Complex-toothed flying squirrel, T. xanthipes
