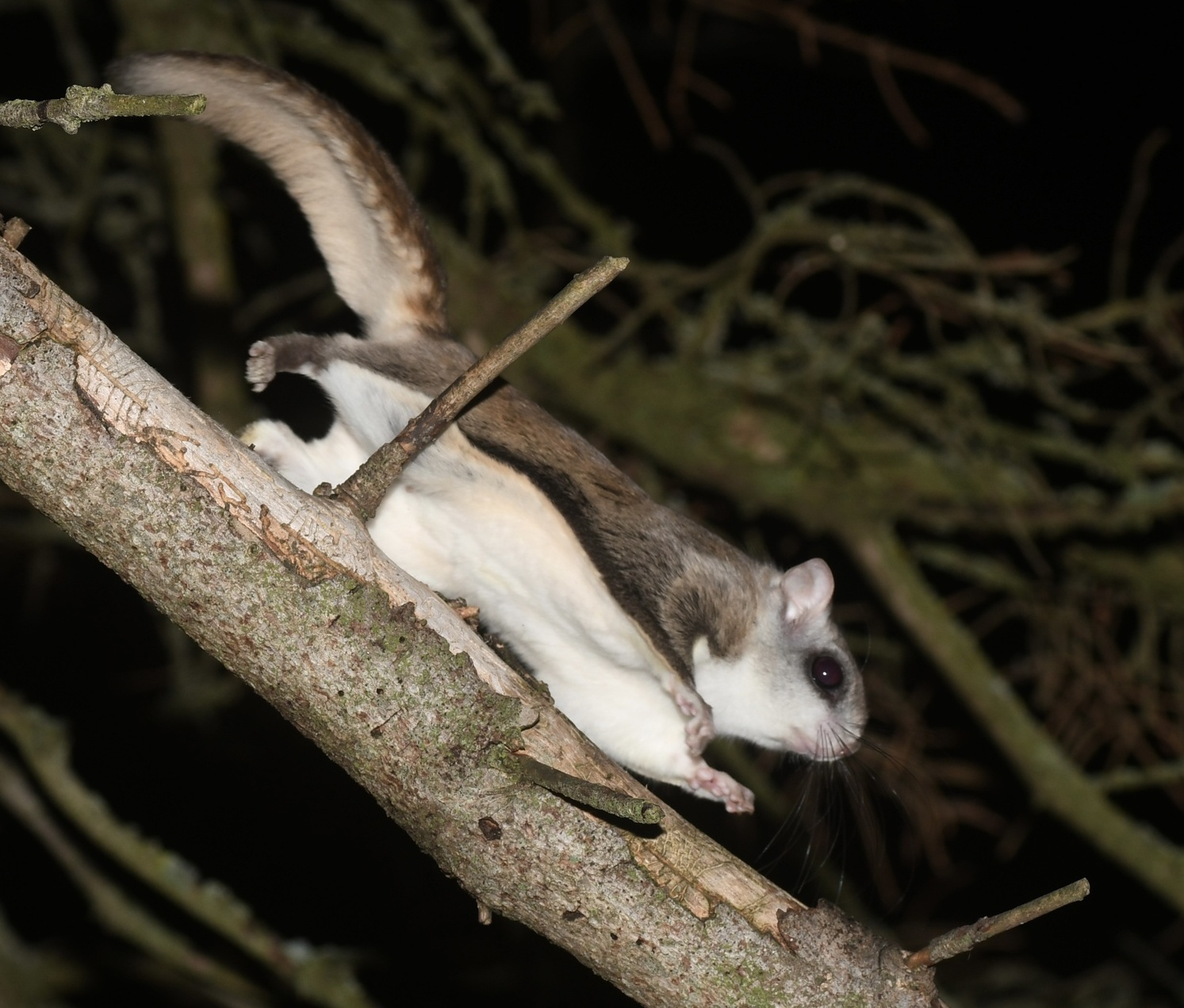
- Northern flying squirrel (Glaucomys sabrinus)

Scientific classification
- Kingdom: Animalia
- Phylum: Chordata
- Class: Mammalia
- Order: Rodentia
- Family: Sciuridae
- Subfamily: Sciurinae
- Tribe: Pteromyini; Brandt, 1855

Genera
- Aeretes; Aeromys; Belomys; Biswamoyopterus; Eoglaucomys; Eupetaurus; Glaucomys; Hylopetes; Iomys; Petaurillus; Petaurista; Petinomys; Priapomys; Pteromys; Pteromyscus; Trogopterus

= Flying squirrel =

Flying squirrel Temporal range: Early Oligocene – Recent

Tribe of mammals

Flying squirrels (scientifically known as Pteromyini or Petauristini) are a tribe of 50 species of squirrels in the family Sciuridae. Despite their name, they are not in fact capable of full flight in the same way as birds or bats, but they are able to glide from one tree to another with the aid of a patagium, a furred skin membrane that stretches from wrist to ankle. Their long tails also provide stability as they glide. Anatomically they are very similar to other squirrels with a number of adaptations to suit their lifestyle; their limb bones are longer and their hand bones, foot bones, and distal vertebrae are shorter. Flying squirrels are able to steer and exert control over their glide path with their limbs and tail. Molecular studies have shown that flying squirrels are monophyletic (having a common ancestor with no non-flying descendants) and originated some 18–20 million years ago. The genus Paracitellus is the earliest lineage to the flying squirrel dating back to the late Oligocene era. Most are nocturnal and omnivorous, eating fruit, seeds, buds, flowers, insects, gastropods, spiders, fungi, bird's eggs, tree sap and young birds. The young are born in a nest and are at first naked and helpless. They are cared for by their mother and by five weeks are able to practice gliding skills so that by ten weeks they are ready to leave the nest.

Some captive-bred southern flying squirrels have become domesticated as small household pets, a type of "pocket pet".

== Description ==
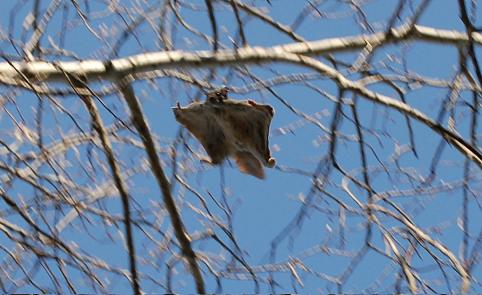
A northern flying squirrel (Glaucomys sabrinus) gliding

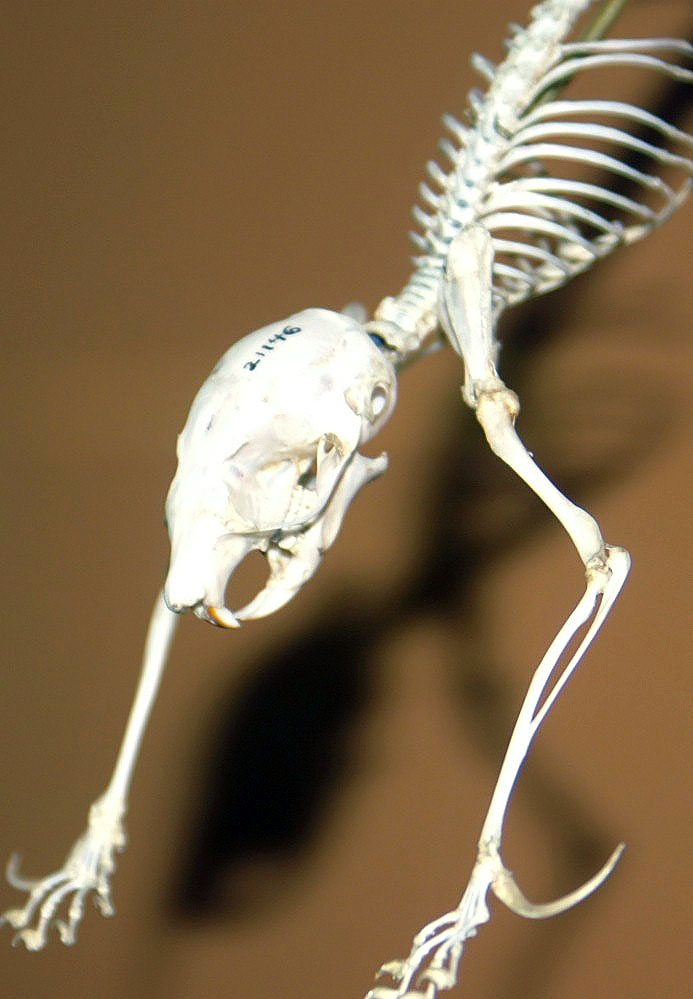
Southern flying squirrel (Glaucomys volans) skeleton at the NMNH. The styliform cartilage attached to the wrist supports the wing membrane.

Flying squirrels are not capable of flight like birds or bats; instead, they glide between trees. They are capable of obtaining lift within the course of these flights, with flights recorded to 90 metres (300 ft). The direction and speed of the animal in midair are varied by changing the positions of its limbs, largely controlled by small cartilaginous wrist bones. There is a cartilage projection from the wrist that the squirrel holds upwards during a glide. This specialized cartilage is only present in flying squirrels and not other gliding mammals. Possible origins for the styliform cartilage have been explored, and the data suggests that it is most likely homologous to the carpal structures that can be found in other squirrels. This cartilage along with the manus forms a wing tip to be used during gliding. After being extended, the wing tip may adjust to various angles, controlling aerodynamic movements. The wrist also changes the tautness of the patagium, a furry parachute-like membrane that stretches from wrist to ankle. It has a fluffy tail that stabilizes in flight. The tail acts as an adjunct airfoil, working as an air brake before landing on a tree trunk. The tail is dorsoventrally (from the back to the front) flattened to help control the surrounding air whilst it is gliding.

=== Similar gliding animals ===
The colugos, Petauridae, and Anomaluridae are gliding mammals which are similar to flying squirrels through convergent evolution, although are not particularly close in relation. Like the flying squirrel, they are scansorial mammals that use their patagium to glide, unpowered, to move quickly through their environment.

=== Evolutionary history ===
Prior to the 21st century, the evolutionary history of the flying squirrel was frequently debated. This debate was clarified greatly as a result of two molecular studies. These studies found support that flying squirrels originated 18–20 million years ago, are monophyletic, and have a sister relationship with tree squirrels. Due to their close ancestry, the morphological differences between flying squirrels and tree squirrels reveal insight into the formation of the gliding mechanism. Compared to squirrels of similar size, flying squirrels, northern and southern flying squirrels show lengthening in bones of the lumbar vertebrae and forearm, whereas bones of the feet, hands, and distal vertebrae are reduced in length. Such differences in body proportions reveal the flying squirrels' adaptation to minimize wing loading and to increase maneuverability while gliding. The consequence for these differences is that unlike regular squirrels, flying squirrels are not well adapted for quadrupedal locomotion and therefore must rely more heavily on their gliding abilities.

Several hypotheses have attempted to explain the evolution of gliding in flying squirrels. One possible explanation is related to energy efficiency and foraging. Gliding is an energetically efficient way to progress from one tree to another while foraging, as opposed to climbing down trees and maneuvering on the ground floor or executing dangerous leaps in the air. By gliding at high speeds, flying squirrels can rummage through a greater area of forest more quickly than tree squirrels. Flying squirrels can glide long distances by increasing their aerial speed and increasing their lift.

Other hypotheses state that the mechanism evolved to avoid nearby predators and prevent injuries. If a dangerous situation arises on a specific tree, flying squirrels can glide to another, and thereby typically escape the previous danger. Furthermore, take-off and landing procedures during leaps, implemented for safety purposes, may explain the gliding mechanism. While leaps at high speeds are important to escape danger, the high-force impact of landing on a new tree could be detrimental to a squirrel's health. Yet the gliding mechanism of flying squirrels involves structures and techniques during flight that allow for great stability and control. If a leap is miscalculated, a flying squirrel may easily steer back onto the original course by using its gliding ability. A flying squirrel also creates a large glide angle when approaching its target tree, decreasing its velocity due to an increase in air resistance and allowing all four limbs to absorb the impact of the target.

=== Fluorescence ===
In 2019 it was observed, by chance, that a flying squirrel fluoresced pink under UV light. Subsequent research by biologists at Northland College in Northern Wisconsin found that this is true for all three species of North American flying squirrels. At this time it is unknown what purpose this serves. Non-flying squirrels do not fluoresce under UV light.

== Taxonomy ==
=== Recent species ===
New World flying squirrels belong to the genus Glaucomys (Greek for gleaming mouse). Old World flying squirrels belong to the genus Pteromys (Greek for winged mouse).

The three species of the genus Glaucomys (Glaucomys sabrinus, Glaucomys volans and Glaucomys oregonensis) are native to North America and Central America; many other taxa are found throughout Asia as well, with the range of the Siberian Flying Squirrel (Pteromys volans) reaching into parts of northeast Europe (Russia, Finland and Estonia).

Thorington and Hoffman (2005) recognize 15 genera of flying squirrels in two subtribes.

Tribe Pteromyini – flying squirrels

- Subtribe Glaucomyina
  - Genus Eoglaucomys
    - Kashmir flying squirrel, Eoglaucomys fimbriatus
      - Afghan flying squirrel, E. f. baberi
  - Genus Glaucomys – New World flying squirrels (American flying squirrels), North America
    - Southern flying squirrel, Glaucomys volans
    - Northern flying squirrel, Glaucomys sabrinus
    - Humboldt's flying squirrel, Glaucomys oregonensis
  - Genus Hylopetes, Southeast Asia
    - Particolored flying squirrel, Hylopetes alboniger
    - Bartel's flying squirrel, Hylopetes bartelsi
    - Gray-cheeked flying squirrel, Hylopetes lepidus
    - Palawan flying squirrel, Hylopetes nigripes
    - Indochinese flying squirrel, Hylopetes phayrei
    - Jentink's flying squirrel, Hylopetes platyurus
    - Sipora flying squirrel, Hylopetes sipora
    - Red-cheeked flying squirrel, Hylopetes spadiceus
    - Sumatran flying squirrel, Hylopetes winstoni
  - Genus Iomys, Malaysia and Indonesia
    - Javanese flying squirrel (Horsfield's flying squirrel), Iomys horsfieldi
    - Mentawi flying squirrel, Iomys sipora
  - Genus Petaurillus – pygmy flying squirrels, Borneo and the Malay Peninsula
    - Lesser pygmy flying squirrel, Petaurillus emiliae
    - Hose's pygmy flying squirrel, Petaurillus hosei
    - Selangor pygmy flying squirrel, Petaurillus kinlochii
  - Genus Petinomys, Southeast Asia
    - Basilan flying squirrel, Petinomys crinitus
    - Travancore flying squirrel, Petinomys fuscocapillus
    - Whiskered flying squirrel, Petinomys genibarbis
    - Hagen's flying squirrel, Petinomys hageni
    - Siberut flying squirrel, Petinomys lugens
    - Mindanao flying squirrel, Petinomys mindanensis
    - Arrow flying squirrel, Petinomys sagitta
    - Temminck's flying squirrel, Petinomys setosus
    - Vordermann's flying squirrel, Petinomys vordermanni
  - Genus Priapomys, western Yunnan in China and adjoining regions of Myanmar
    - Himalayan large-eared flying squirrel, P. leonardi
- Subtribe Pteromyina
  - Genus Aeretes, northeastern China
    - Groove-toothed flying squirrel (North Chinese flying squirrel), Aeretes melanopterus
  - Genus Aeromys – large black flying squirrels, Thailand to Borneo
    - Black flying squirrel, Aeromys tephromelas
    - Thomas's flying squirrel, Aeromys thomasi
  - Genus Belomys, Southeast Asia
    - Hairy-footed flying squirrel, Belomys pearsonii
  - Genus Biswamoyopterus, northeastern India to southern China and southeast Asia
    - Namdapha flying squirrel, Biswamoyopterus biswasi
    - Laotian giant flying squirrel, Biswamoyopterus laoensis
    - Mount Gaoligong flying squirrel Biswamoyopterus gaoligongensis
  - Genus Eupetaurus, Pakistan to China; rare
    - Western woolly flying squirrel, Eupetaurus cinereus
    - Yunnan woolly flying squirrel, Eupetaurus nivamons
    - Tibetan woolly flying squirrel, Eupetaurus tibetensis
  - Genus Petaurista - giant flying squirrels, Southeast and East Asia
    - Red and white giant flying squirrel, Petaurista alborufus
    - Spotted giant flying squirrel, Petaurista elegans
    - Hodgson's giant flying squirrel, Petaurista magnificus
    - Bhutan giant flying squirrel, Petaurista nobilis
    - Indian giant flying squirrel, Petaurista philippensis
    - Chinese giant flying squirrel, Petaurista xanthotis
    - Japanese giant flying squirrel, Petaurista leucogenys
    - Red giant flying squirrel, Petaurista petaurista
    - Mechuka giant flying squirrel, Petaurista mechukaensis
    - Mishmi Hills giant flying squirrel, Petaurista mishmiensis
    - Mebo giant flying squirrel, Petaurista siangensis
  - Genus Pteromys – Old World flying squirrels, Finland to Japan
    - Siberian flying squirrel, Pteromys volans
    - Japanese dwarf flying squirrel, Pteromys momonga
  - Genus Pteromyscus, southern Thailand to Borneo
    - Smoky flying squirrel, Pteromyscus pulverulentus
  - Genus Trogopterus, China
    - Complex-toothed flying squirrel, Trogopterus xanthipes

The Mechuka, Mishmi Hills, and Mebo giant flying squirrels were discovered in the northeastern state of India of Arunachal Pradesh in the late 2000s. Their holotypes are preserved in the collection of the Zoological Survey of India, Kolkata, India.

=== Fossil species ===
Flying squirrels have a well-documented fossil record from the Oligocene onwards. Some fossil genera go far back as the Eocene, and given that the flying squirrels are thought to have diverged later, these are likely misidentifications.

- Miopetaurista
  - Miopetaurista crusafonti
  - Miopetaurista dehmi
  - Miopetaurista diescalidus
  - Miopetaurista gaillardi
  - Miopetaurista gibberosa
  - Miopetaurista lappi
  - Miopetaurista neogrivensis
  - Miopetaurista thaleri
  - Miopetaurista tobieni
- Pliopetaurista
  - Pliopetaurista kollmanni Daxner-Höck, 2004
- Neopetes
  - Neopetes hoeckarum (De Bruijn, 1998)
  - Neopetes macedoniensis (Bouwens and De Bruijn, 1986)
  - Neopetes debruijni (Reumer & Hoek Ostende, 2003)

== Life cycles ==
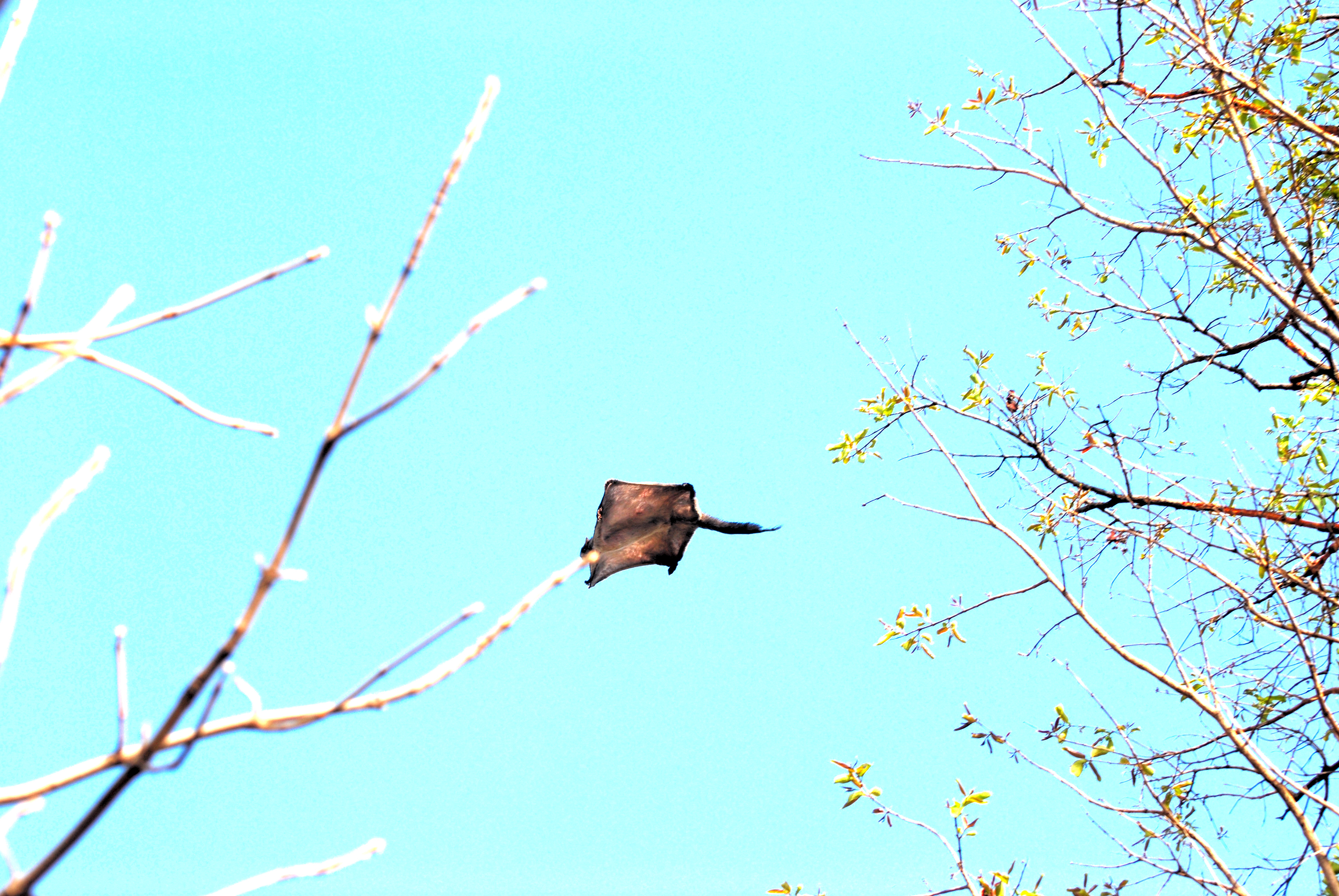
A southern flying squirrel (Glaucomys volans) gliding

The life expectancy of flying squirrels in the wild is about six years, and up to about fifteen years in captivity. Mortality rate in young flying squirrels is high because of predators and diseases. Predators of flying squirrels include tree snakes, raccoons, owls, martens, fishers, coyotes, bobcats, and feral cats. In the Pacific Northwest of North America, the northern spotted owl (Strix occidentalis) is a common predator.

Flying squirrels are usually nocturnal, since they are not adept at escaping birds of prey that hunt during the daytime. They are often omnivorous and opportunistic in diet, eating whatever is available. The North American southern flying squirrel eats seeds, insects, gastropods (slugs and snails), spiders, shrubs, flowers, fungi, and tree sap.

=== Reproduction ===
The mating season for flying squirrels is during February and March. When the infants are born, the female squirrels live with them in maternal nest sites. The mothers nurture and protect them until they leave the nest. The males do not participate in nurturing their offspring.

At birth, flying squirrels are mostly hairless, apart from their whiskers, and most of their senses are not present. Their internal organs are visible through the skin, and their sex can be signified. By week five, they are almost fully developed. At that point, they can respond to their environment and start to develop a mind of their own. Through the upcoming weeks of their lives, they practice leaping and gliding. After two and a half months, their gliding skills are perfected, they are ready to leave the nest, and they are capable of independent survival.

=== Diet ===
Flying squirrels can easily forage for food in the night, given their highly developed sense of smell. They harvest fruits, nuts, fungi, and birds' eggs. Many gliders have specialized diets and there is evidence showing gliders may be able to take advantage of scattered protein deficient food. Although gliding is less energy efficient, its greater speed allows flying squirrels to spend more time foraging, and less time in transit.

Skull shape in flying squirrels is strongly influenced by diet, influenced by the differing jaw and teeth needs for various foods. Species that consume abrasive and low-nutrient diets, such as folivores (flower and leaf eaters) and generalists, typically exhibit large, wide, and robust skulls, characterized by wide zygomatic arches on the sides of the skull, and anatomical features on the skull to accommodate large and powerful chewing muscles. Conversely, frugivorous species generally tend toward smaller and narrower skulls, while nucivorous (nut eating) species display a wide variability in cranial size and shape.

== See also ==
- Anomalure, aka: scaly-tailed squirrel
- Flying and gliding animals
- Gliding possum
