= Hainan flying squirrel =

Scientific classification
- Kingdom: Animalia
- Phylum: Chordata
- Class: Mammalia
- Order: Rodentia
- Family: Sciuridae
- Genus: Hylopetes
- Species: H. electilis

Binomial name
- Hylopetes electilis (G. M. Allen, 1925)

Synonyms
- Hylopetes phayrei electilis

Species of rodent

The Hainan flying squirrel (Hylopetes electilis) is a species of rodent in the family Sciuridae. It is endemic to Hainan Island in China.

It was formerly considered conspecific with the Indochinese flying squirrel (H. phayrei) until a 2013 study found them to be distinct species. Both species have anatomical and genetic differences, as well as differences in pelage coloration. They are thought to have a relatively recent genetic divergence from one another.

== Nut caching ==
Hylopetes electilis is one of two squirrels (the other is Hylopetes alboniger that hang elliptical or oblate nuts securely in vegetation. They carve grooves into the nuts, using them to fix the nuts tightly between small intersecting twigs, reminiscent of the mortise-tenon joint in carpentry. Strategically, these cache sites are 10–25 m away from the nearest nut-producing tree, reducing potential theft. This behavior not only ensures secure storage but may also influence the forest's tree distribution.
