= Junggarisciurus =

Junggarisciurus Temporal range: Priabonian

Scientific classification
- Kingdom: Animalia
- Phylum: Chordata
- Class: Mammalia
- Infraclass: Placentalia
- Order: Rodentia
- Family: Sciuridae
- Subfamily: Sciurinae
- Genus: †Junggarisciurus; Li et al., 2023
- Species: †J. jeminaiensis

Binomial name
- †Junggarisciurus jeminaiensis Li et al., 2023

Extinct genus of squirrels

Junggarisciurus is an extinct genus of sciurine sciurid that lived during the Late Eocene.

== Distribution ==
Junggarisciurus jeminaiensis fossils are known from the Keziletuogayi Formation in the Junggar Basin in northwestern China.
