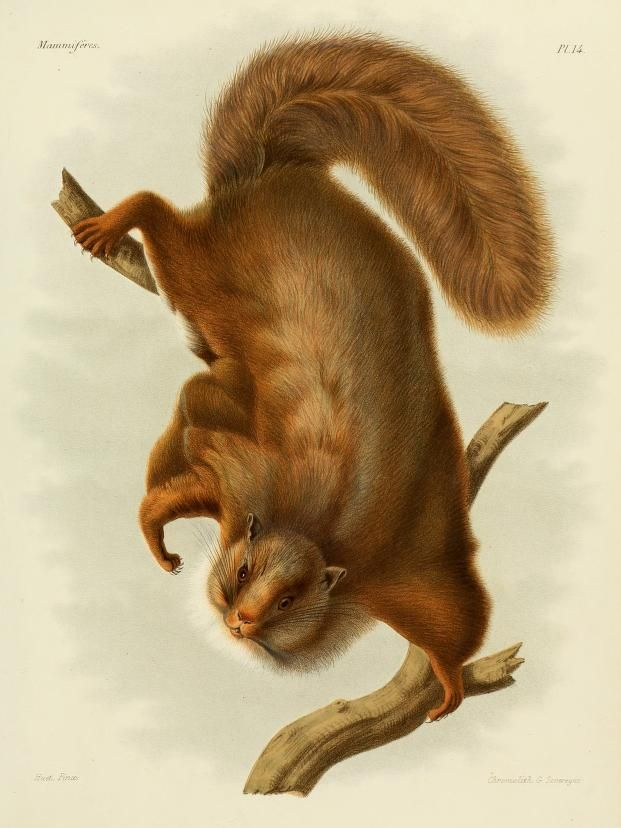

Conservation status
- Near Threatened (IUCN 3.1)

Scientific classification
- Kingdom: Animalia
- Phylum: Chordata
- Class: Mammalia
- Order: Rodentia
- Family: Sciuridae
- Subfamily: Sciurinae
- Tribe: Pteromyini
- Genus: Trogopterus; Heude, 1898
- Species: T. xanthipes

Binomial name
- Trogopterus xanthipes (A. Milne-Edwards, 1867)

Synonyms
- Pteromys xanthipes A. Milne-Edwards, 1867; Trogopterus mordax Thomas, 1914; Trogopterus himalaicus Thomas, 1914; Trogopterus edithae Thomas, 1923; Trogopterus minax Thomas, 1923

= Complex-toothed flying squirrel =

Complex-toothed flying squirrel Temporal range: Early Pleistocene to Recent

Species of rodent

The complex-toothed flying squirrel (Trogopterus xanthipes) occurs in the southern Chinese provinces Hubei, Hunan, Guizhou, Sichuan, and Yunnan. The common name refers to the teeth, which differ from those of other species of flying squirrels.

== Description ==
Trogopterus xanthipes looks much like other flying squirrels, but with a characteristic tuft of black hair below the base of the ear. The fur is generally grey-brown, but white beneath. There is a slight reddish tinge to the face and the tail. The overall length is about 60 cm, of which the tail is about half.

== Conservation ==
The conservation status of the complex-toothed flying squirrel is near threatened because the population is shrinking as a result of habitat loss and excessive hunting for food and traditional Chinese medicine. The droppings of the flying squirrel are made into a tea used in traditional medicine in parts of China.

With the initial purpose of improve living and mating conditions for the fragmented populations of the giant panda, nearly 70 natural reserves have been combined to form the Giant Panda National Park in 2020. With a size of 10,500 square miles the park is roughly three times as large as Yellowstone National Park and incorporates the area of the Wolong National Nature Reserve. Flying squirrels are among the various other species who profit from the protection of their habitat and there is hope that their numbers will rise again due to this measure. A large number of the former inhabitants of the protected area have been relocated, however local officials have been known to turn a blind eye on local farmers allowing their cattle to graze within the limits of the park, so in order to ensure effective conservation of nature, of all species populating the area, some rules will have to be enforced with more vigor in the future.

== Biology and reproduction ==
Trogopterus xanthipes builds its nests in cliffs, usually around 30 m above the ground. They live in mountainous terrain in altitudes of 1300 to 1500 m above sea level, or even up to 2750 m according to some sources. Their activity pattern is nocturnal; they leave their nests at night to search for food, such as nuts, fruits, and leaves. They become sexually mature at about 22 months. A litter may comprise up to four young, and gestation lasts for roughly 80 to 90 days. Captive specimens have been reported to live for ten to twelve years.

== Taxonomy ==
Though five species of the genus Trogopterus have been described, current opinion favours including them all in the same species: Trogopterus xanthipes. The hairy-footed flying squirrel (Belomys pearsoni) is closely related, and may be added to the genus Trogopterus.

== Medical and commercial interest ==
The species is collected as a meat animal, and also is captured for collection of the fecal matter, which is valued in traditional Chinese medicine as "five spirits grease" (五靈脂, wǔ líng zhī). It is used in the treatment of ulcers in the duodenum. Recent research has attempted to establish whether the fecal matter includes components of possible medical interest. Antithrombotic flavonoids have been reported. Various diterpenoids, both known and unknown, have been evaluated for cytotoxicity against human tumor cell lines, and so have various neolignans classed as trogopterins. Although none of the compounds showed clinically significant activity against important tumor cell lines, some did produce detectable cytotoxic effects, suggesting a source of lignans with cytotoxic activity.
