= Miopetaurista =

Miopetaurista Temporal range: Miocene–Pliocene

Scientific classification
- Kingdom: Animalia
- Phylum: Chordata
- Class: Mammalia
- Order: Rodentia
- Family: Sciuridae
- Tribe: Pteromyini
- Genus: †Miopetaurista; Kretzoi, 1962

Species
- Miopetaurista crusafonti Miopetaurista dehmi Miopetaurista diescalidus Miopetaurista gaillardi Miopetaurista gibberosa Miopetaurista lappi Miopetaurista neogrivensis Miopetaurista thaleri Miopetaurista tobieni Miopetaurista webbi

Extinct genus of rodents

Miopetaurista is an extinct genus of flying squirrels in the family Sciuridae. Fossils of this genus have been found from the Miocene and Pliocene of Europe (France, Germany), Asia (China), and North America (Florida, Tennessee).

== Description ==
A partial skeleton from the Miocene of Spain indicates that Miopetaurista very closely resembles living Petaurista giant flying squirrels in overall anatomy and therefore probably ecology.
