= Eopetes =

Eopetes Temporal range: Priabonian

Scientific classification
- Kingdom: Animalia
- Phylum: Chordata
- Class: Mammalia
- Infraclass: Placentalia
- Order: Rodentia
- Family: Sciuridae
- Genus: †Eopetes; Li et al., 2023
- Species: †E. irtyshensis

Binomial name
- †Eopetes irtyshensis Li et al., 2023

Extinct genus of squirrels

Eopetes is an extinct genus of sciurine sciurid that lived during the Priabonian stage of the Eocene epoch.

== Distribution ==
Eopetes irtyshensis fossils are known from the Keziletuogayi Formation in the Junggar Basin of Xinjiang.
