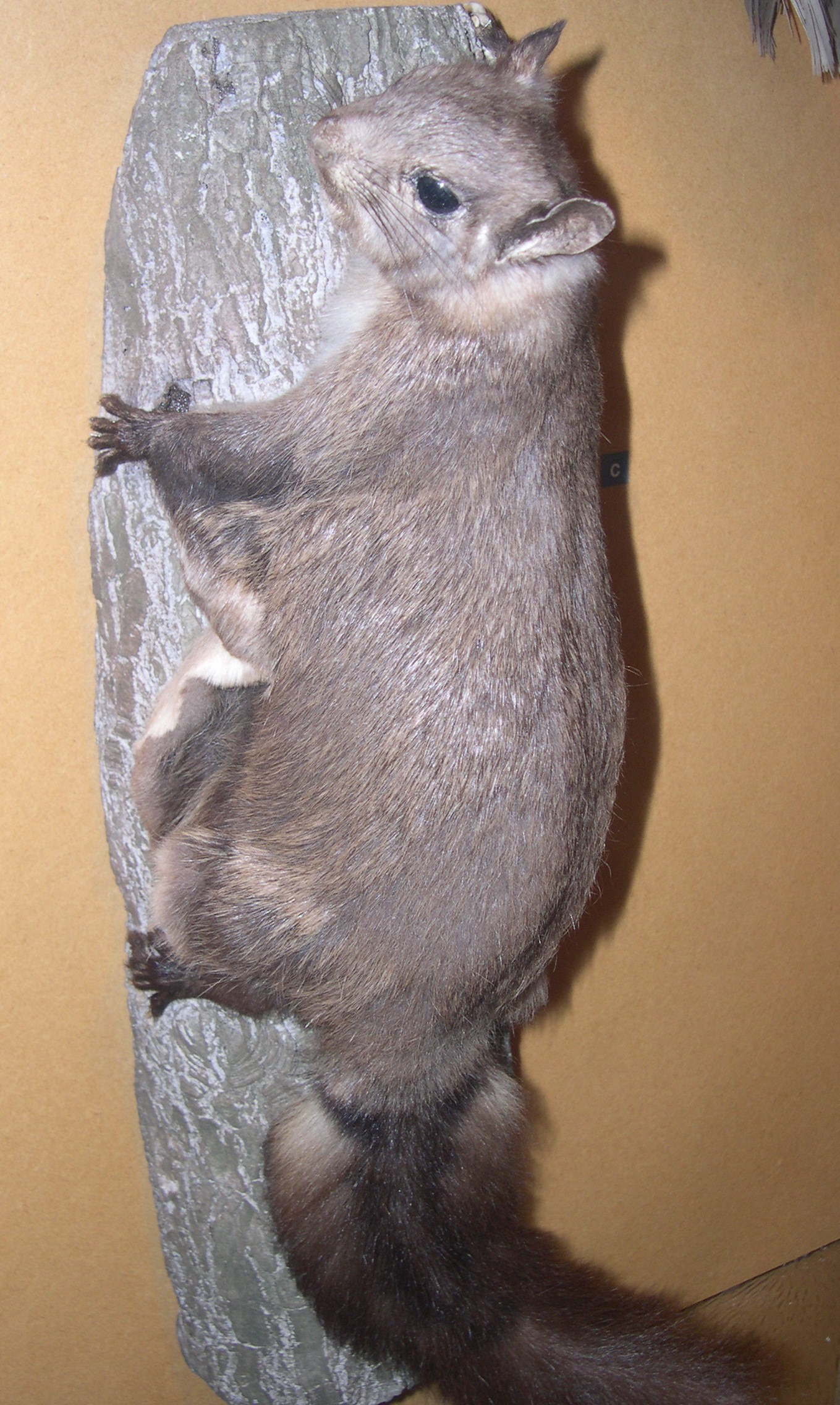
- Palawan flying squirrel (Hylopetes nigripes)

Scientific classification
- Domain: Eukaryota
- Kingdom: Animalia
- Phylum: Chordata
- Class: Mammalia
- Order: Rodentia
- Family: Sciuridae
- Subfamily: Sciurinae
- Tribe: Pteromyini
- Genus: Hylopetes; Thomas, 1908

Type species
- Sciuropterus everetti Thomas, 1908 (= Sciruopterus spadiceus Blyth, 1847)

Species
- See text

= Hylopetes =

Hylopetes Temporal range: Late Miocene to Recent

Genus of rodents

Hylopetes is a genus of flying squirrels. There are about 10 species.

Species include:

- Particolored flying squirrel - H. alboniger (Hodgson, 1836)
- Bartel's flying squirrel - H. bartelsi Chasen, 1939
- Hainan flying squirrel - H. electilis (Allen, 1925)
- Palawan flying squirrel - H. nigripes (Thomas, 1893)
- Indochinese flying squirrel - H. phayrei (Blyth, 1859)
- Jentink's flying squirrel - H. platyurus (Jentink, 1890)
- Arrow flying squirrel - H. sagitta (Linnaeus, 1766)
- Sipora flying squirrel - H. sipora Chasen, 1940
- Red-cheeked flying squirrel - H. spadiceus (Blyth, 1847)
- Sumatran flying squirrel - H. winstoni (Sody, 1949)
