= Pygmy flying squirrel =

Scientific classification
- Domain: Eukaryota
- Kingdom: Animalia
- Phylum: Chordata
- Class: Mammalia
- Order: Rodentia
- Family: Sciuridae
- Subfamily: Sciurinae
- Tribe: Pteromyini
- Genus: Petaurillus; Thomas, 1908

Type species
- Sciuropterus hosei Thomas, 1900

Species
- See text

Genus of rodents

Pygmy flying squirrels (Petaurillus) are a genus of flying squirrels.

== Species ==
- Lesser pygmy flying squirrel Petaurillus emiliae Thomas, 1908
- Hose's pygmy flying squirrel Petaurillus hosei (Thomas, 1900)
- Selangor pygmy flying squirrel Petaurillus kinlochii (Robinson & Kloss, 1911)
