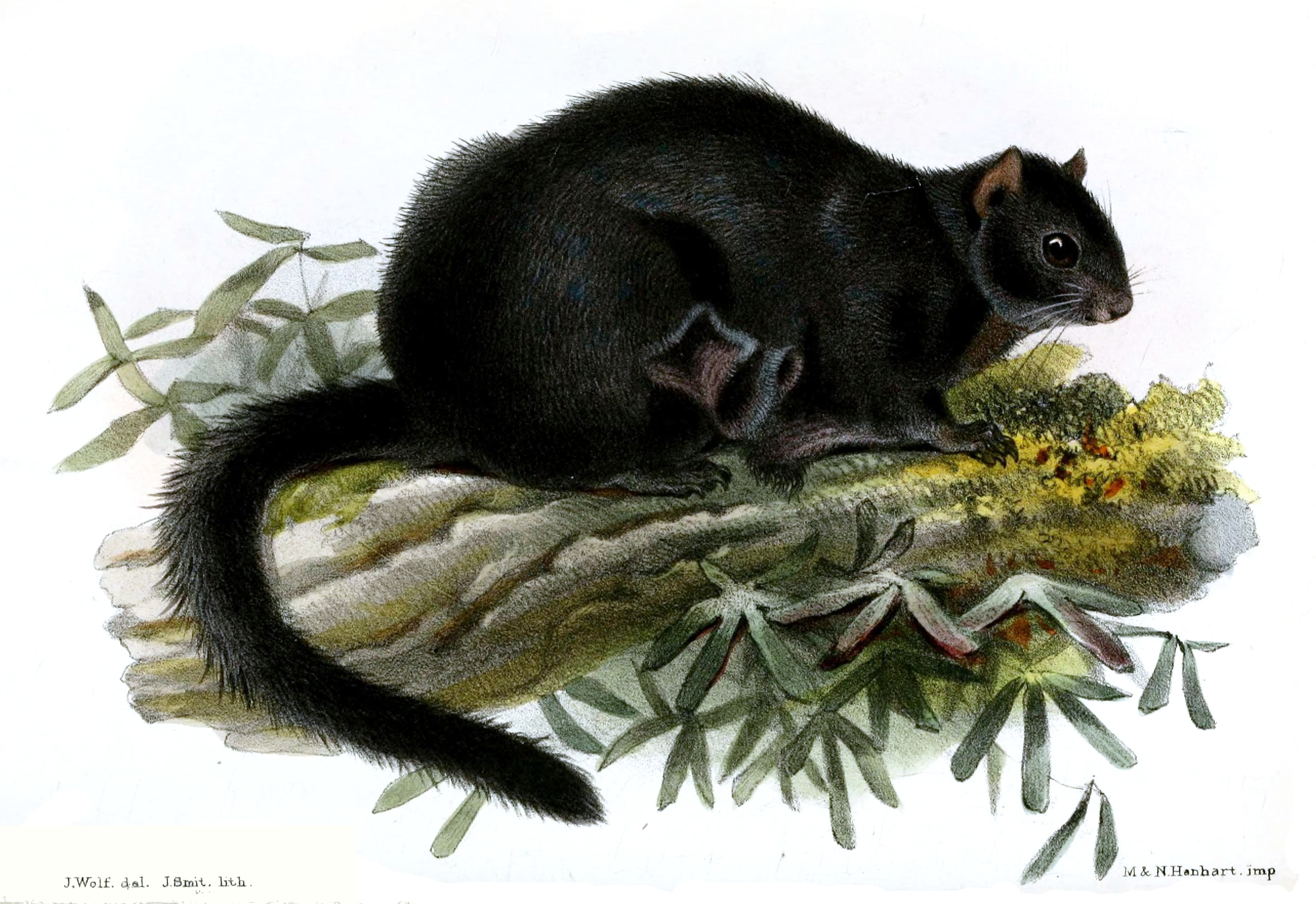
- Black flying squirrel, Aeromys tephromelas

Scientific classification
- Kingdom: Animalia
- Phylum: Chordata
- Class: Mammalia
- Infraclass: Placentalia
- Order: Rodentia
- Family: Sciuridae
- Subfamily: Sciurinae
- Tribe: Pteromyini
- Genus: Aeromys; Robinson & Kloss, 1915

Type species
- Pteromys tephromelas Günther, 1873

Species
- Aeromys tephromelas Aeromys thomasi

= Large black flying squirrel =

Genus of rodents

Large black flying squirrels (genus Aeromys) form a taxon of squirrels under the tribe Pteromyini. They are only found in South-east Asia.

== Species ==
There are two species of large black flying squirrel:

- Black flying squirrel, Aeromys tephromelas
- Thomas's flying squirrel, Aeromys thomasi
