= Himalayan large-eared flying squirrel =

Scientific classification
- Kingdom: Animalia
- Phylum: Chordata
- Class: Mammalia
- Order: Rodentia
- Family: Sciuridae
- Tribe: Pteromyini
- Genus: Priapomys; Li et al., 2021
- Species: P. leonardi

Binomial name
- Priapomys leonardi (Thomas, 1921)

Synonyms
- Pteromys leonardi Hylopetes alboniger leonardi

Species of rodent

The Himalayan large-eared flying squirrel (Priapomys leonardi) is a species of flying squirrel found in southwestern Yunnan Province, China, and adjoining Myanmar. It is the only member of the genus Priapomys.

== Taxonomy ==
P. leonardi was formerly considered a subspecies of the particolored flying squirrel (Hylopetes alboniger) as H. a. leonardi. It was initially described as a species of Pteromys from a single specimen collected in Myanmar in 1921 by Oldfield Thomas, which remained the only record of the taxon for over 90 years. Future taxonomic treatments, without serious review of the taxon, considered it a subspecies of H. alboniger, and other treatments outright considered it synonymous with H. alboniger.

In surveys from 2014 to 2016, whose results were published in 2021, several flying squirrels morphologically very similar to the original H. a. leonardi specimen were collected on Mt. Gaoligong in Yunnan; genetic analysis performed upon these found these to not only represent their own species, but a completely separate genus most closely related to Iomys, a genus of flying squirrel restricted to Sundaland. This new genus was named Priapomys after the Greek fertility god Priapus, as reference to the very large glans penis of male members of this species. The American Society of Mammalogists recognizes these results. Priapomys and Iomys are thought to have diverged during the mid-Miocene.

== Description ==
This species has a larger external ear than most other flying squirrels, and has a less-developed uropatagium. It can also be differentiated by aspects in the development of its cheek teeth, as well as its larger glans penis.

== Conservation ==
Due to its small body size, this species is not actively hunted or poached, but it is indiscriminately caught in traps set for hunting meat by visiting herb collectors. This species has also been observed being sold in wet markets in the vicinity of Mt. Gaoligong. Despite its small range, this species is not thought to be extremely threatened, and thus it has been proposed that it be classified as Near Threatened on the IUCN Red List.
