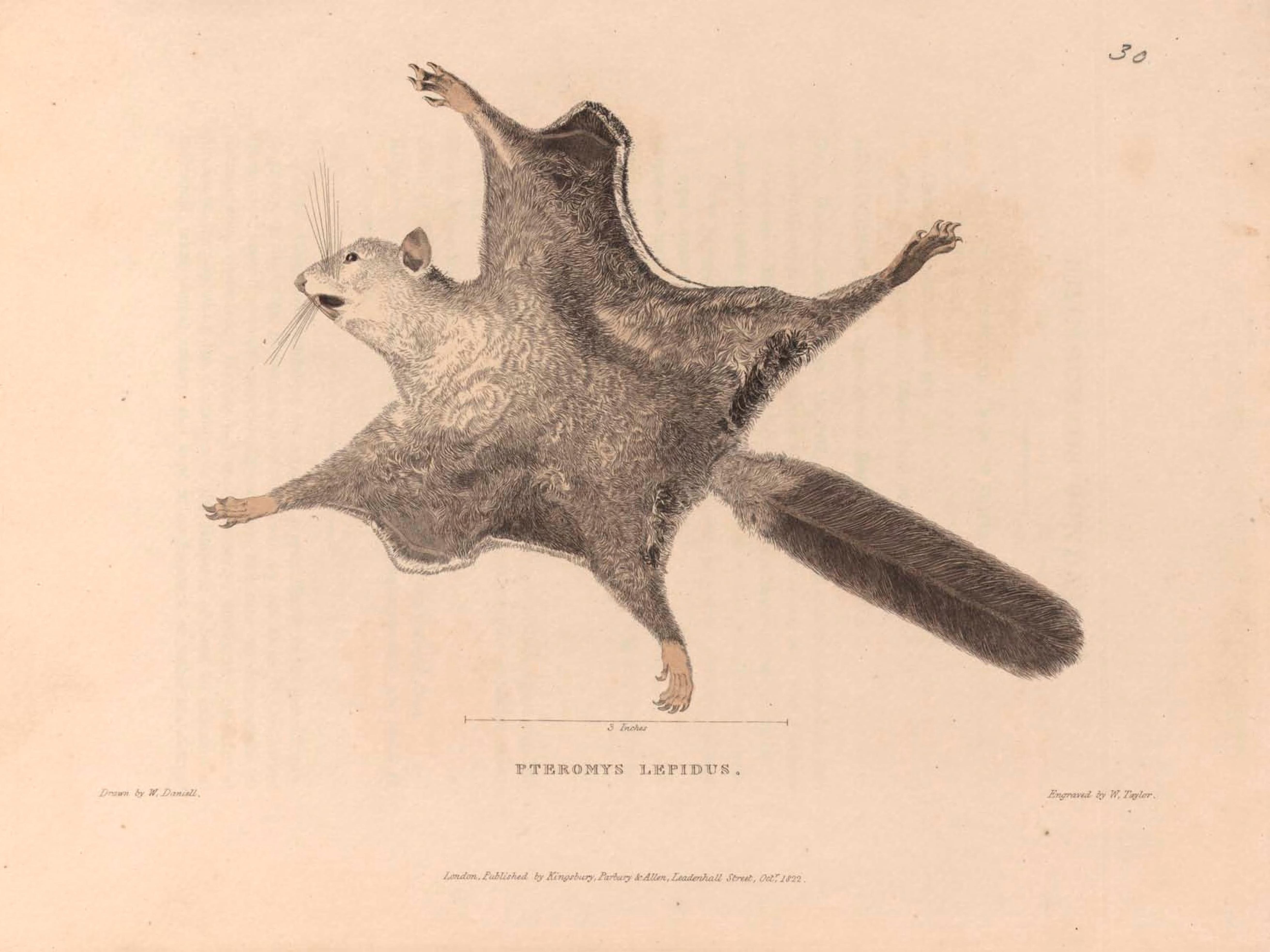

Conservation status
- Data Deficient (IUCN 3.1)

Scientific classification
- Kingdom: Animalia
- Phylum: Chordata
- Class: Mammalia
- Infraclass: Placentalia
- Order: Rodentia
- Family: Sciuridae
- Genus: Hylopetes
- Species: H. sagitta

Binomial name
- Hylopetes sagitta (Linnaeus, 1766)

Synonyms
- Sciurus sagitta Linnaeus, 1766; Petinomys sagitta (Linnaeus, 1766); Pteromys lepidus Horsfield, 1824; Hylopetes lepidus (Horsfield, 1824)

= Arrow flying squirrel =

Species of rodent

The arrow flying squirrel (Hylopetes sagitta) is a species of flying squirrel. It is endemic to Java and Bangka, Indonesia. The population is unknown as it has only been collected from a few localities. It is nocturnal and arboreal and may be found in primary and secondary forest. It is threatened by forest loss due to logging and agriculture and there are no known conservation actions.

Phylogenetic evidence indicates that the grey-cheeked flying squirrel (H. lepidus), a widespread species described in 1822 and known from peninsular Thailand, Malaysia, Sumatra, Java and Borneo, is conspecific with this species.
