= Sumatran flying squirrel =

Conservation status
- Data Deficient (IUCN 3.1)

Scientific classification
- Kingdom: Animalia
- Phylum: Chordata
- Class: Mammalia
- Infraclass: Placentalia
- Order: Rodentia
- Family: Sciuridae
- Genus: Hylopetes
- Species: H. winstoni

Binomial name
- Hylopetes winstoni (Sody, 1949)
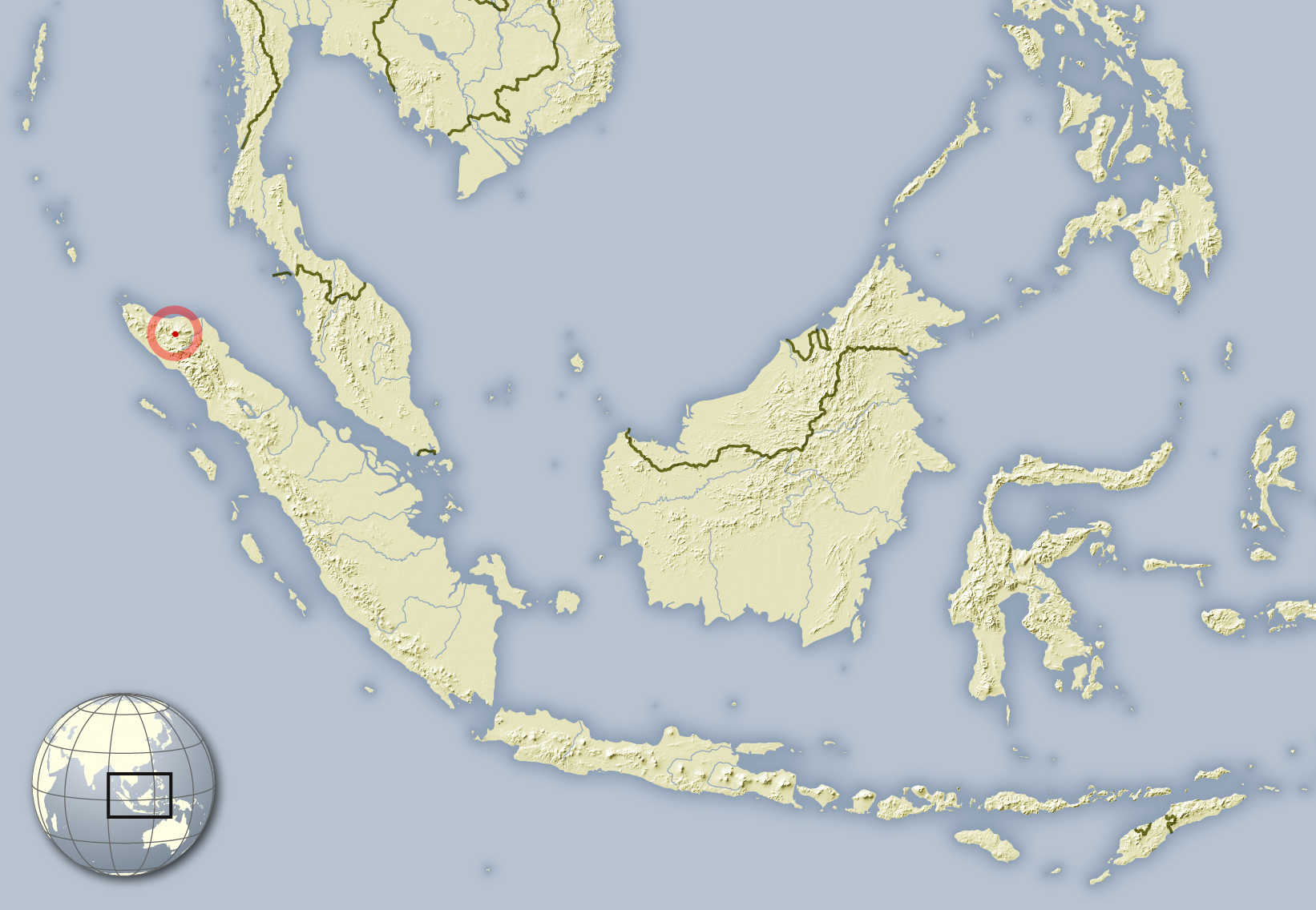
- Sumatran Flying Squirrel Range

Species of mammal

The Sumatran flying squirrel (Hylopetes winstoni) is a flying squirrel only found on the island of Sumatra. It is listed as data deficient on the IUCN red list. Originally discovered in 1949, it is known only from a single specimen. It is a nocturnal, arboreal creature, spending most of its life in the canopy. The Sumatran flying squirrel is threatened by a restricted range and habitat loss due to logging. Unlike most other flying squirrels, it does not have a membrane connecting to its tail.
