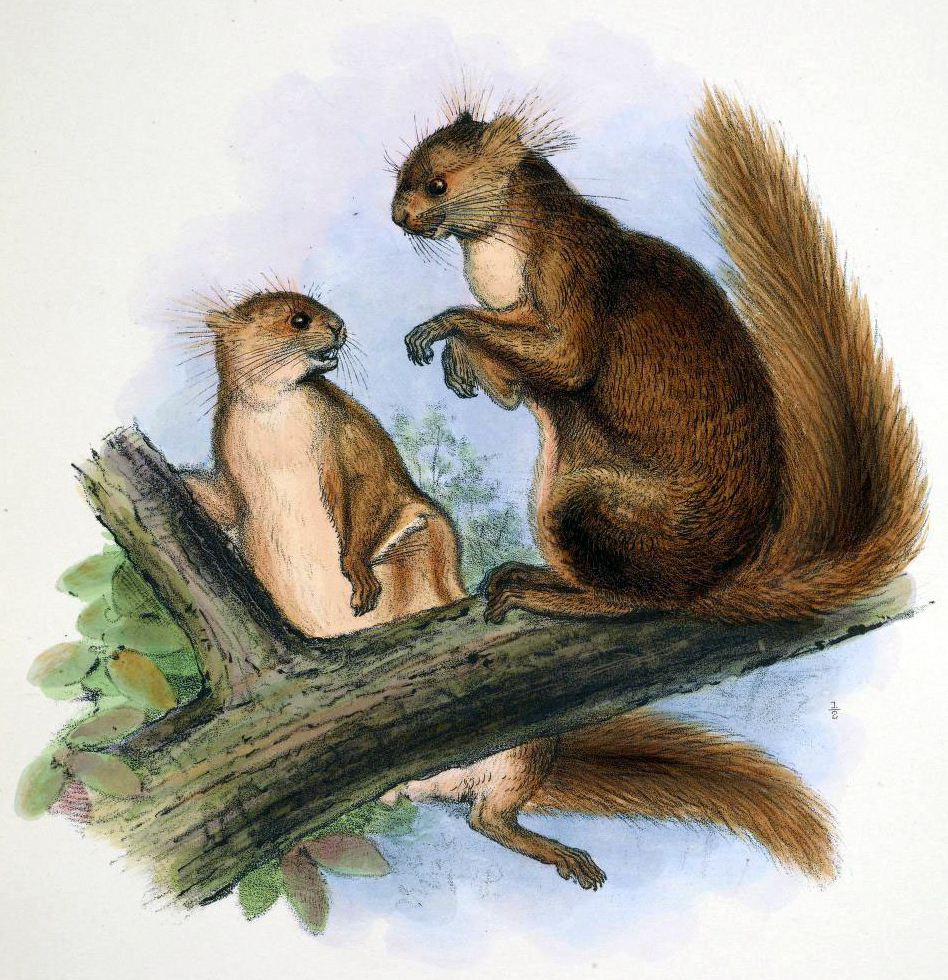
- Hairy-footed flying squirrel (illustration from 1878)

Scientific classification
- Kingdom: Animalia
- Phylum: Chordata
- Class: Mammalia
- Infraclass: Placentalia
- Order: Rodentia
- Family: Sciuridae
- Tribe: Pteromyini
- Genus: Belomys; Thomas, 1908

Type species
- Sciruopterus pearsonii J. E. Gray, 1842

Species
- Belomys pearsonii; †Belomys parapearsoni; †Belomys thamkaewi

= Belomys =

Belomys Temporal range: Late Pliocene to Recent

Genus of rodent

Belomys is a genus of squirrels that contains a single extant species, the hairy-footed flying squirrel (Belomys pearsonii).

Fossil species include the Pleistocene Belomys thamkaewi and the Late Pliocene Belomys parapearsoni, both from Southeast Asia.
