= Travancore flying squirrel =

Conservation status
- Least Concern (IUCN 3.1)

Scientific classification
- Kingdom: Animalia
- Phylum: Chordata
- Class: Mammalia
- Order: Rodentia
- Family: Sciuridae
- Genus: Petinomys
- Species: P. fuscocapillus

Binomial name
- Petinomys fuscocapillus (Jerdon, 1847)

Synonyms
- Sciuropterus layardi Kelaart, 1850; Sciuropterus fuscocapillus Jerdon, 1847

Species of rodent

Travancore flying squirrel (Petinomys fuscocapillus) is a flying squirrel found in Sri Lanka and the Western Ghats of South India. Travancore flying squirrels were thought to be extinct but were rediscovered in 1989 after a gap of 100 years in Kerala (Nanayakkara et al. 2013). It was subsequently confirmed to also be present in Sri Lanka after 78 years (Nanayakkara et al. 2013). The animals were reported only in wet and intermediate zones of the island, and had a few sightings in the Sinharaja Forest Reserve.

== Description ==
The head and body length is 32 cm, and the tail is 25–29 cm. Dorsally, this species is reddish brown, with ruddy-tinged grayish underparts. The tail is feather-shaped and reddish brown with a blackish undersurface. Their vibrissae are black. Like other members of this genus, the fur is soft, long and sheen.

== Subspecies ==
There are 2 subspecies:

- Petinomys fuscocapillus fuscocapillus (Jerdon, 1847) - Western Ghats of Peninsular India
- Petinomys fuscocapillus layardi (Kelaart, 1850) - Sri Lanka.

== Ecology ==
A rare, nocturnal mammal with a largely frugivorous diet, they are known to eat bark, shoots, and leaves, and sometimes insects.
