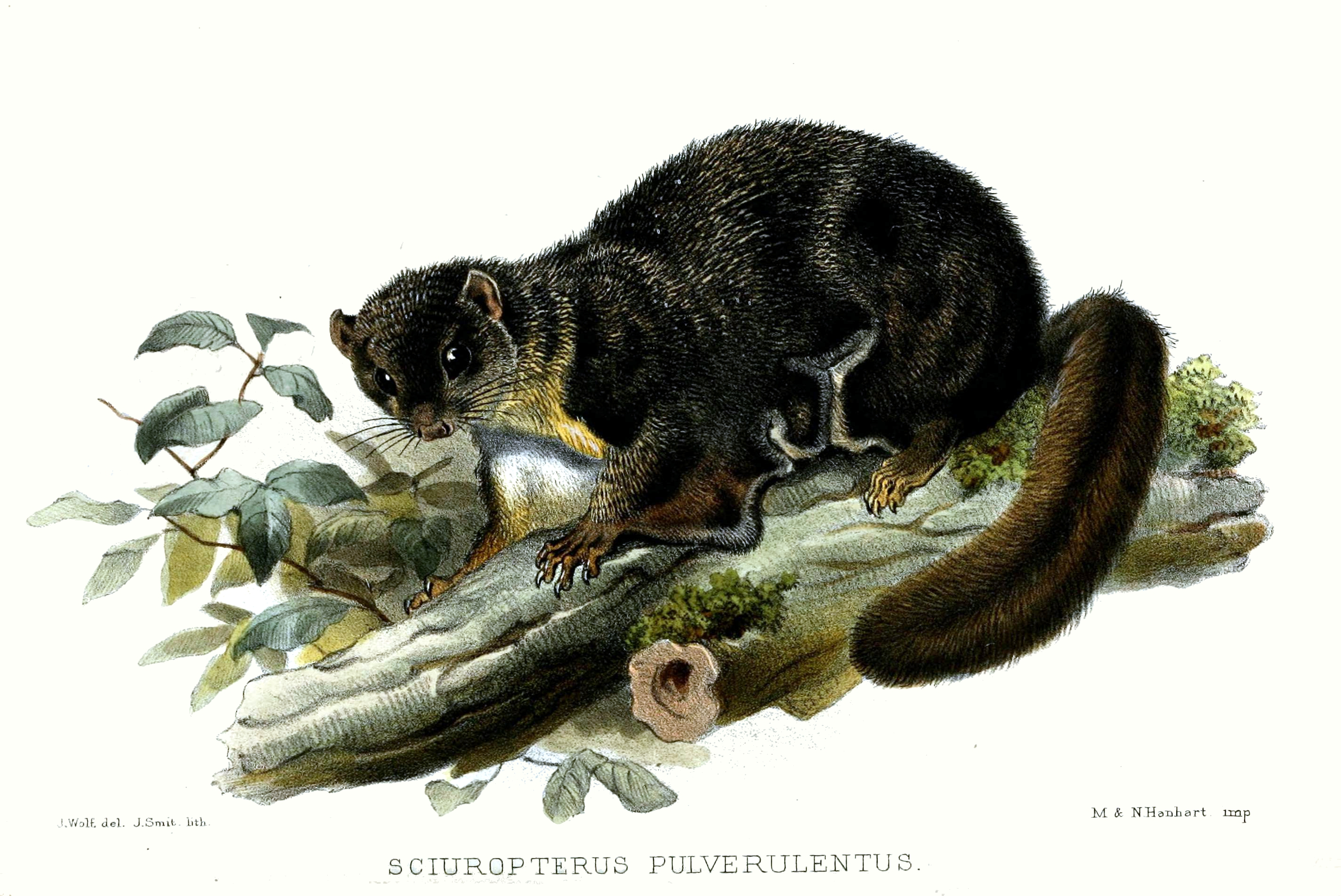

Conservation status
- Endangered (IUCN 3.1)

Scientific classification
- Kingdom: Animalia
- Phylum: Chordata
- Class: Mammalia
- Order: Rodentia
- Family: Sciuridae
- Tribe: Pteromyini
- Genus: Pteromyscus; Thomas, 1908
- Species: P. pulverulentus

Binomial name
- Pteromyscus pulverulentus (Günther, 1873)

= Smoky flying squirrel =

Species of rodent

The smoky flying squirrel (Pteromyscus pulverulentus) is a species of rodent in the family Sciuridae. It is monotypic within the genus Pteromyscus. It is found in parts of Brunei, Indonesia, Peninsular Malaysia, and southern Thailand, but its range may be more extensive than currently mapped. Their natural habitat is subtropical or tropical dry forests. It is listed as an endangered species because of estimated population loss of 50% in past and future, judging from extensive and rapid habitat loss.

Its average body length ranges from 22 centimetres to 29 centimetres (cm). Their tails range from 18 to 23 centimetres, feet range from 38 to 45 millimetres (mm), and ears range from 17 to 23 millimetres. In total, the smoky flying squirrel weights approximately 5 to 9 ounces (oz).

According to records of sightings from Borneo and Malaysia, the species is only rarely sighted even in primary/pristine forest, although it lives mainly in these conditions. A threat to the smoky flying squirrel population is habitat loss due to low elevational range, restricting or preventing long-distance gliding needed to maintain a large range. Smoky flying squirrels usually eat fruits, nuts, and fungi found on nocturnal forays through the trees.
