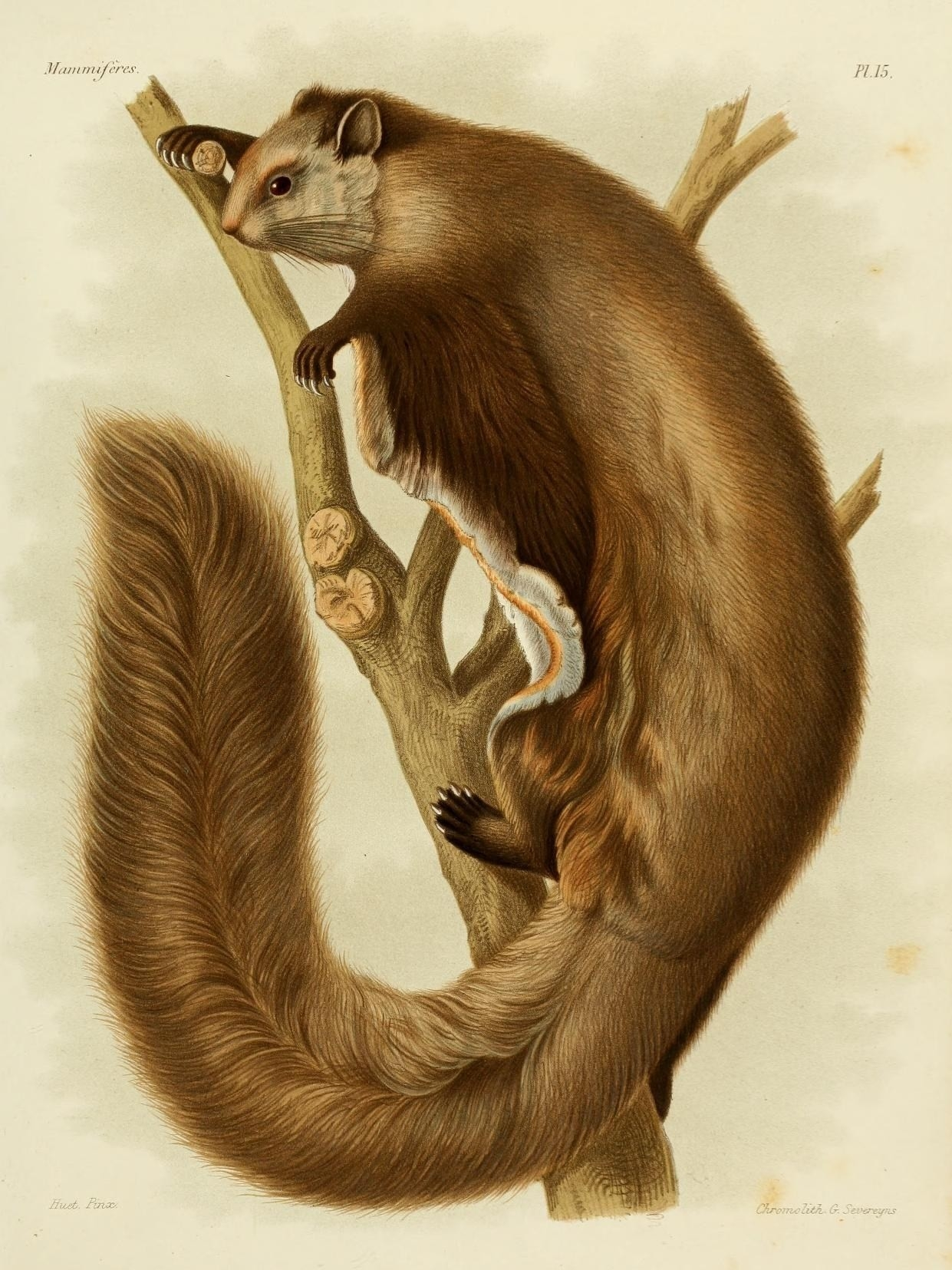

Scientific classification
- Kingdom: Animalia
- Phylum: Chordata
- Class: Mammalia
- Order: Rodentia
- Family: Sciuridae
- Tribe: Pteromyini
- Genus: Aeretes; G. M. Allen, 1940

Type species
- Pteromys melanopterus A. Milne-Edwards

Species
- Aeretes melanopterus; †Aeretes grandidens; †Aeretes premelanopterus

= Aeretes =

Aeretes Temporal range: Late Pliocene - Recent

Genus of rodent

Aeretes is a genus of squirrels that contains a single extant species, the groove-toothed flying squirrel (Aeretes melanopterus).

Two fossil species are also known from Late Pliocene of China.

The earliest fossil record of Aeretes was found in South China in Middle Pleistocene deposits. In the Beijing area, the earliest records are from Upper Cave and Tianyuan Cave at Zhoukoudian. These fossils are of the Late Pleistocene age. The geographical distribution of this species are very limited. Aeretes experience evolution through the increase and decrease of tooth size throughout time.

Aeretes melanopterus is known for its distinctive teeth, which feature grooves on its upper incisors. This unique characteristic helps the squirrel gnaw more efficiently, possibly giving it an advantage when feeding on tougher plant materials.

In addition to changes in their tooth size, the height of their crown continuously increased over time. Due to an adaptation of learning to process the material of tougher plants such as tree bark and fibrous vegetation
