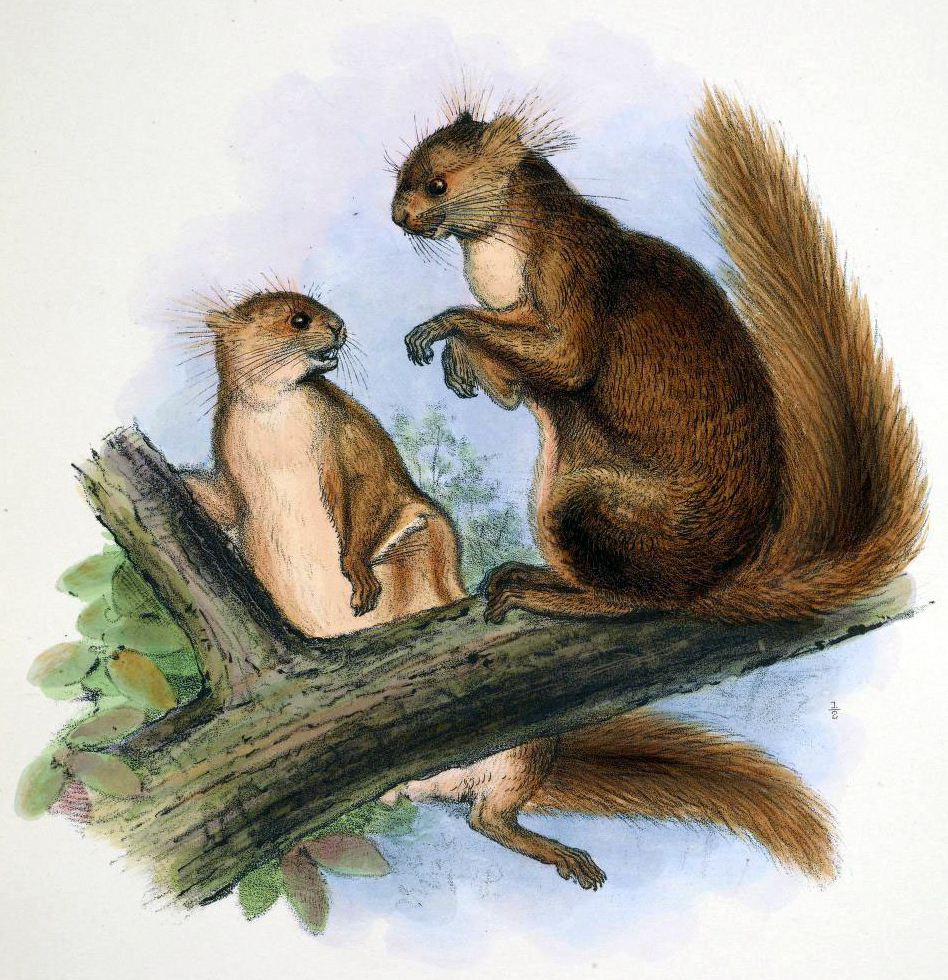

Conservation status
- Data Deficient (IUCN 3.1)

Scientific classification
- Kingdom: Animalia
- Phylum: Chordata
- Class: Mammalia
- Order: Rodentia
- Family: Sciuridae
- Genus: Belomys
- Species: B. pearsonii

Binomial name
- Belomys pearsonii (J. E. Gray, 1842)
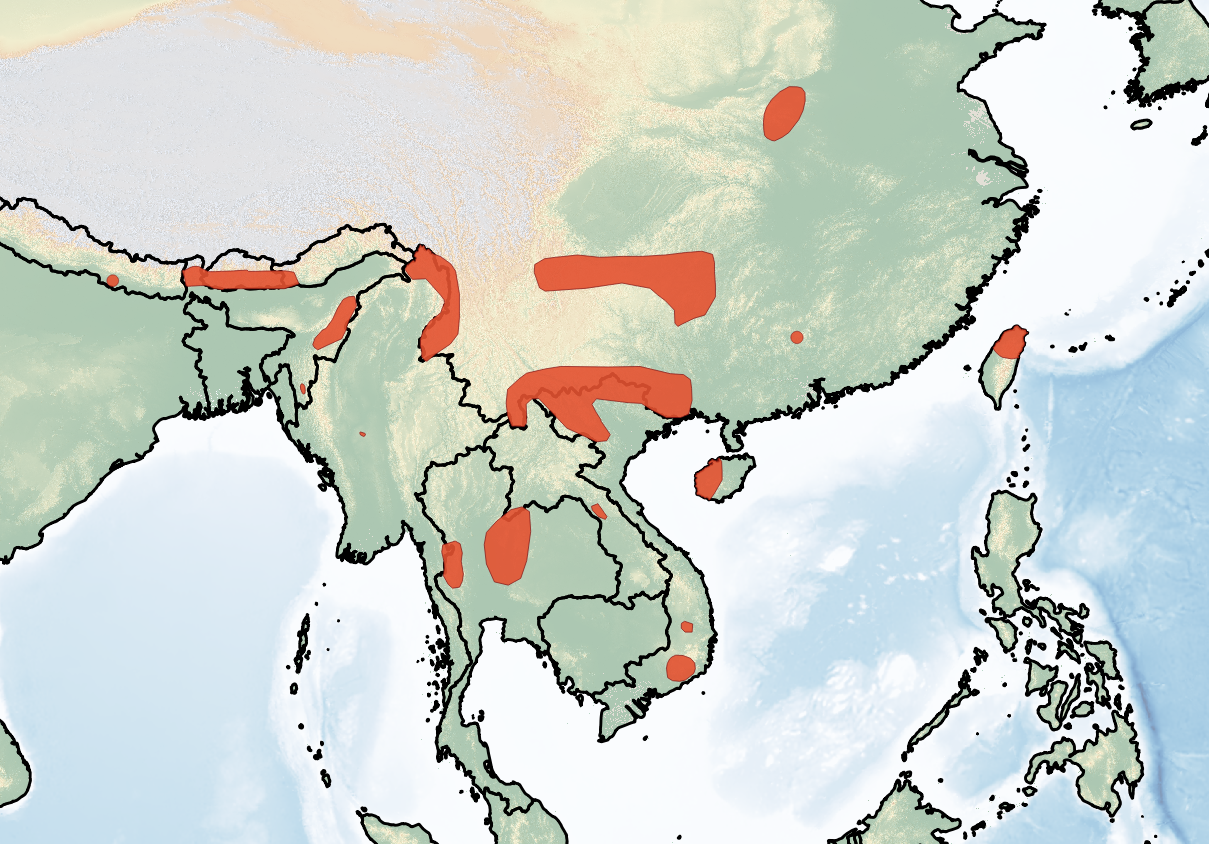

Synonyms
- Sciuropterus pearsonii Gray, 1842; Trogopterus pearsonii (Gray, 1842)

= Hairy-footed flying squirrel =

Species of rodent

The hairy-footed flying squirrel (Belomys pearsonii) is a flying squirrel found in the mountains of the eastern Himalaya, Southeast Asia, southern China, and the island of Taiwan. It lives at elevations of 800–2,400 m (2,600–7,900 ft) above sea level.

The fur is red-brown on the top and white at the bottom. the margins of the eyelids are dark brown, and the sides of the face are pale rufous; the ears are moderately large and rounded, rather dark brown towards the tips, and pencilled at the base, anteriorly and posteriorly, with long delicate hairs. Characteristic are the long hair at the feet, which even covers the claws to protect against the cold in the higher altitudes. The body has a length of about 22 cm; the tail is another 13 cm long.

== Taxonomy and systematics ==
As hairy-footed flying squirrel is related to the complex-toothed flying squirrel, some taxonomists have included the species to the genus Trogopterus. However, its status as distinct genus is now generally accepted. The species is named after John Thomas Pearson.

There are four subspecies: Belomys pearsonii pearsonii, B. m. blandus, B. m. kaleensis, and B. m. trichotis. B. m. kaleensis is endemic to Taiwan. It appears to be genetically distinct from Vietnamese specimens, which themselves represented two distinct lineages (of unknown subspecies). All three lineages are distinct enough to be recognized as separate species.
