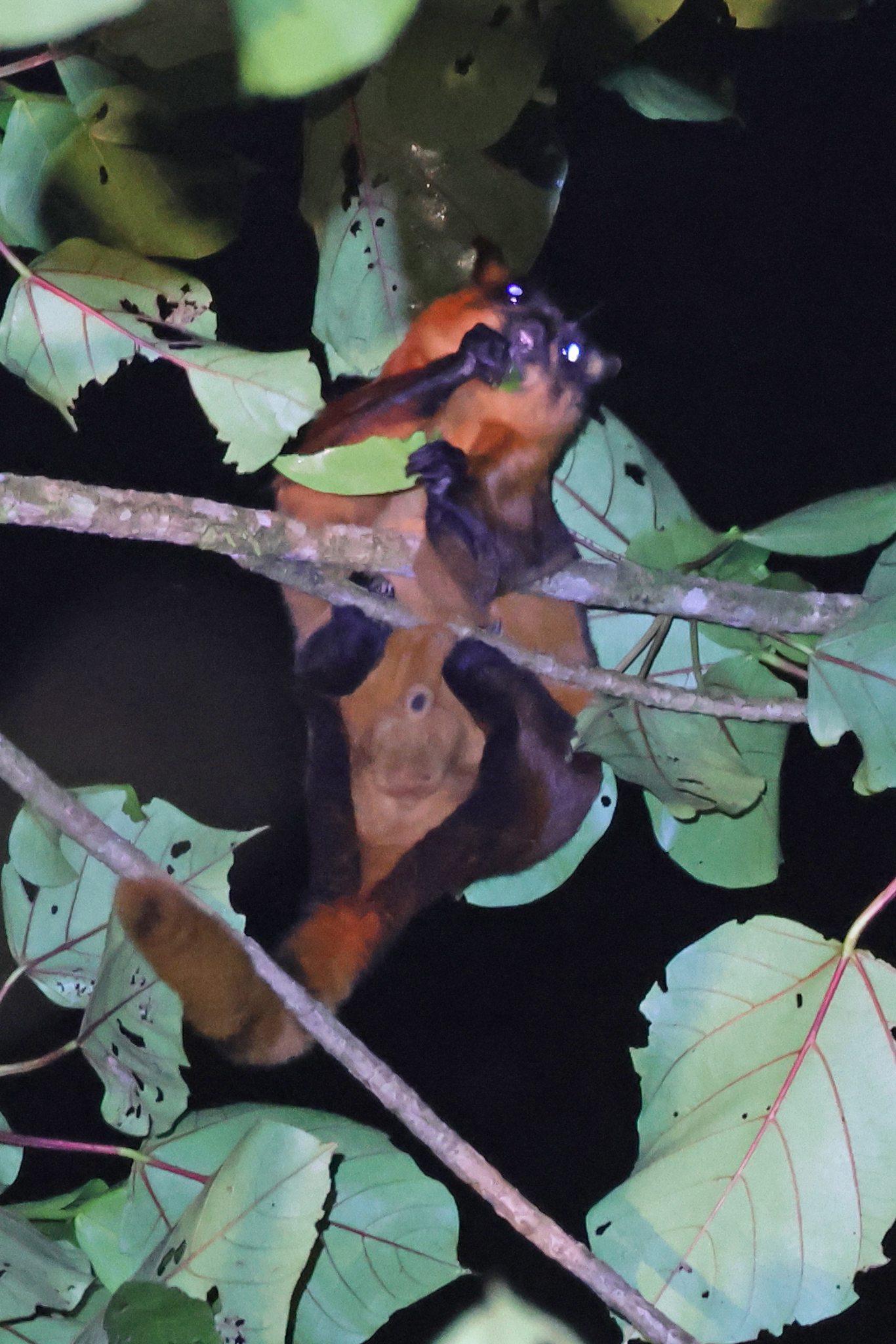

Conservation status
- Least Concern (IUCN 3.1)

Scientific classification
- Kingdom: Animalia
- Phylum: Chordata
- Class: Mammalia
- Order: Rodentia
- Family: Sciuridae
- Genus: Aeromys
- Species: A. thomasi

Binomial name
- Aeromys thomasi (Hose, 1900)

= Thomas's flying squirrel =

Species of rodent

Thomas's flying squirrel (Aeromys thomasi) is a species of rodent in the family Sciuridae. It is one of two species in the genus Aeromys. It is found in Indonesia and Malaysia.
