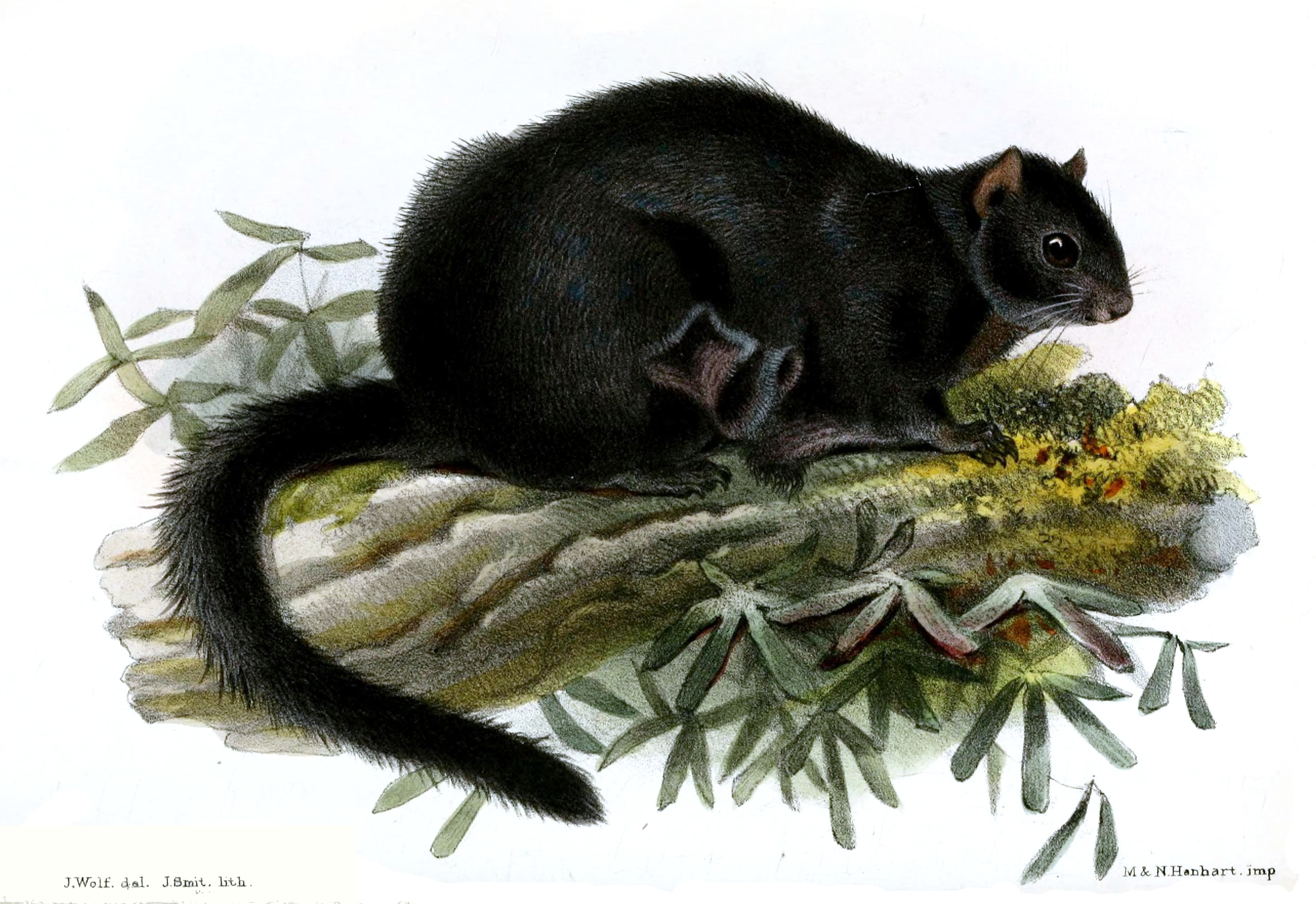

Conservation status
- Data Deficient (IUCN 3.1)

Scientific classification
- Kingdom: Animalia
- Phylum: Chordata
- Class: Mammalia
- Order: Rodentia
- Family: Sciuridae
- Genus: Aeromys
- Species: A. tephromelas

Binomial name
- Aeromys tephromelas (Günther, 1873)
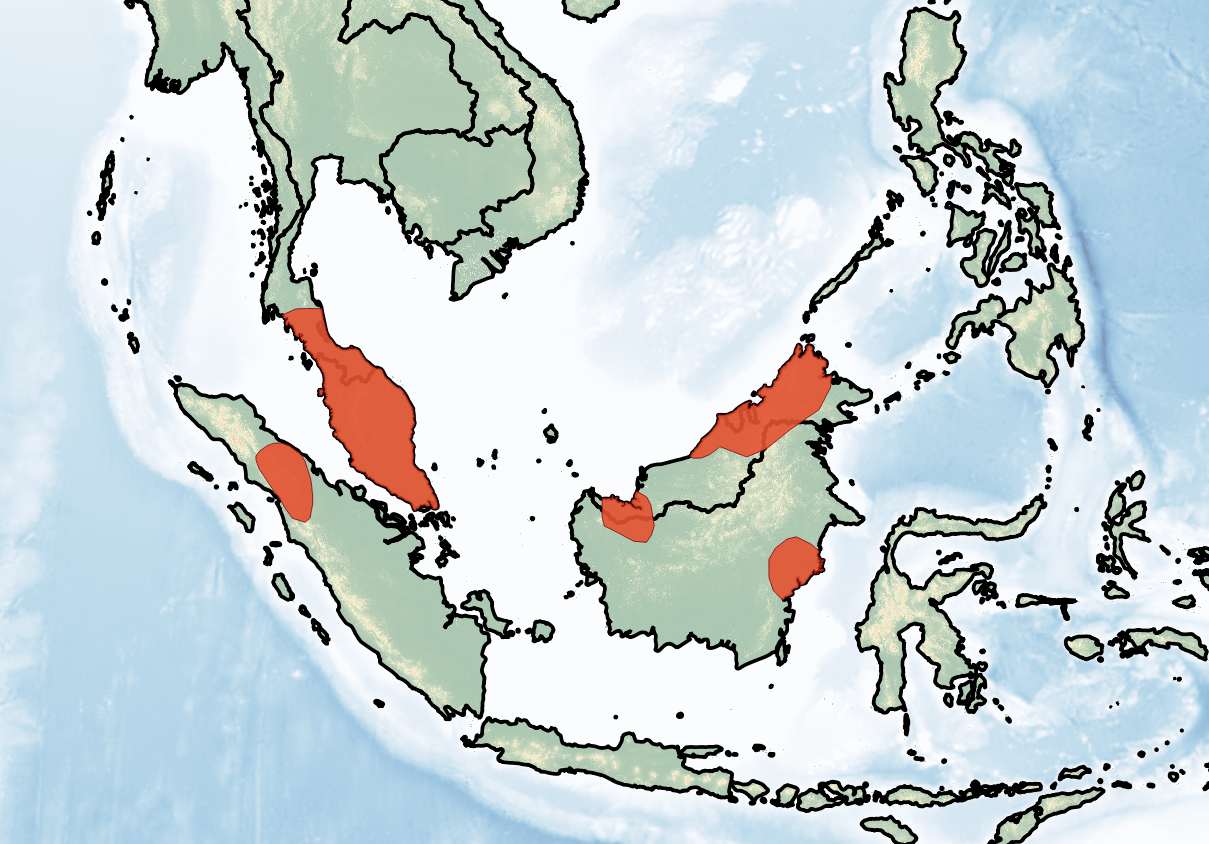

Synonyms
- Pteromys tephromelas

= Black flying squirrel =

Species of rodent

The black flying squirrel or large black flying squirrel (Aeromys tephromelas) is a species of rodent in the family Sciuridae. It is found in Brunei, Indonesia, and Malaysia; its habitat is primary and secondary forests and gardens where it uses tree hollows. It feeds on fruits, nuts and other vegetable matter. It is likely not threatened and is adaptable to habitat loss. Black flying squirrels tend to have smaller populations than other squirrels because female black flying squirrels breed infrequently and have a small litter size of just one young.
