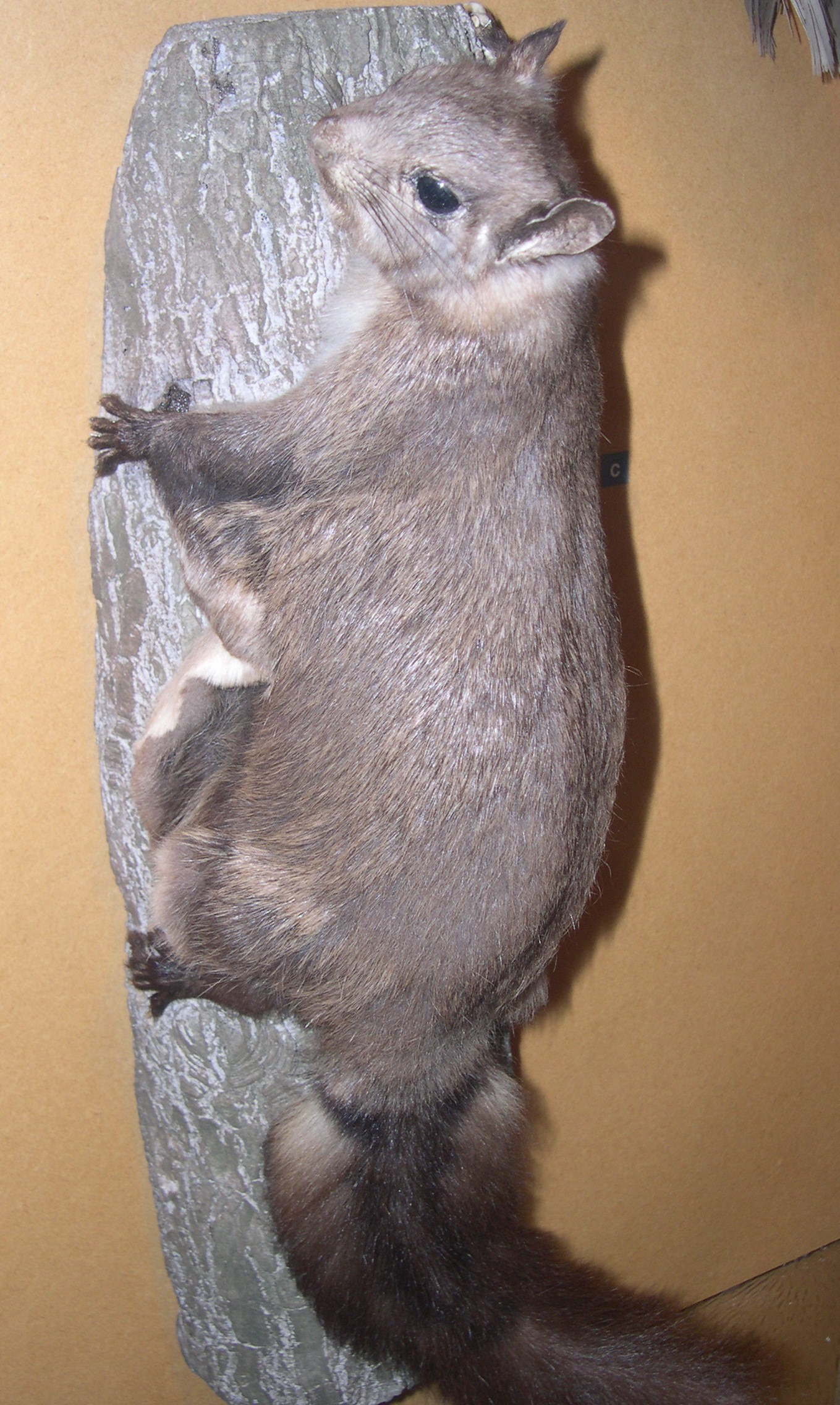

Conservation status
- Near Threatened (IUCN 3.1)

Scientific classification
- Kingdom: Animalia
- Phylum: Chordata
- Class: Mammalia
- Order: Rodentia
- Family: Sciuridae
- Genus: Hylopetes
- Species: H. nigripes

Binomial name
- Hylopetes nigripes (Thomas, 1893)
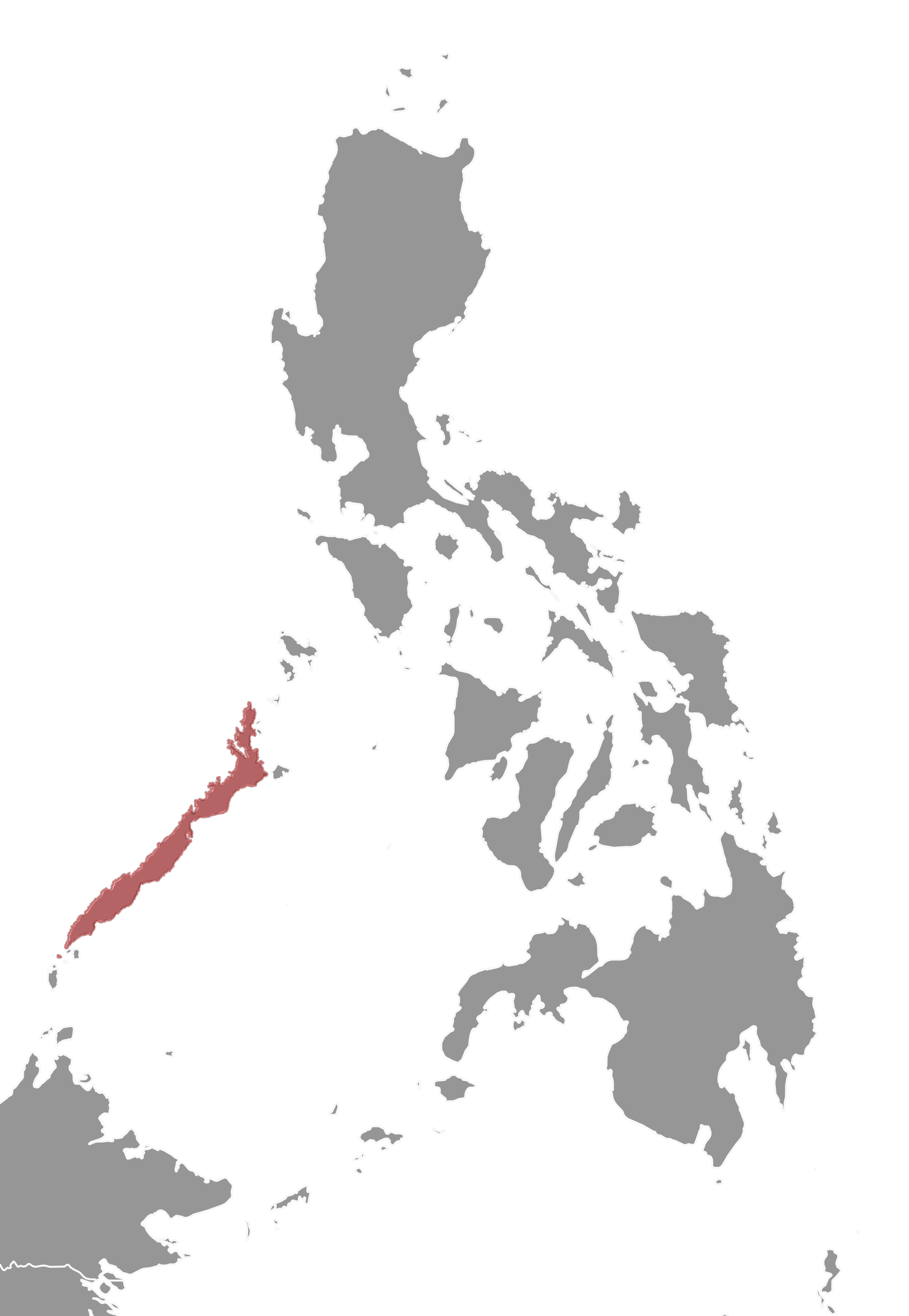

= Palawan flying squirrel =

Species of rodent

The Palawan flying squirrel or tapilak (Hylopetes nigripes) is a species of rodent in the family Sciuridae. It is endemic to the Philippines.

Its natural habitat is subtropical or tropical dry forests.

Its population is decreasing as time goes on. It is a nocturnal species, and is mainly being destroyed by deforestation
