= Sipora flying squirrel =

Conservation status
- Endangered (IUCN 3.1)

Scientific classification
- Kingdom: Animalia
- Phylum: Chordata
- Class: Mammalia
- Order: Rodentia
- Family: Sciuridae
- Genus: Hylopetes
- Species: H. sipora

Binomial name
- Hylopetes sipora Chasen, 1940
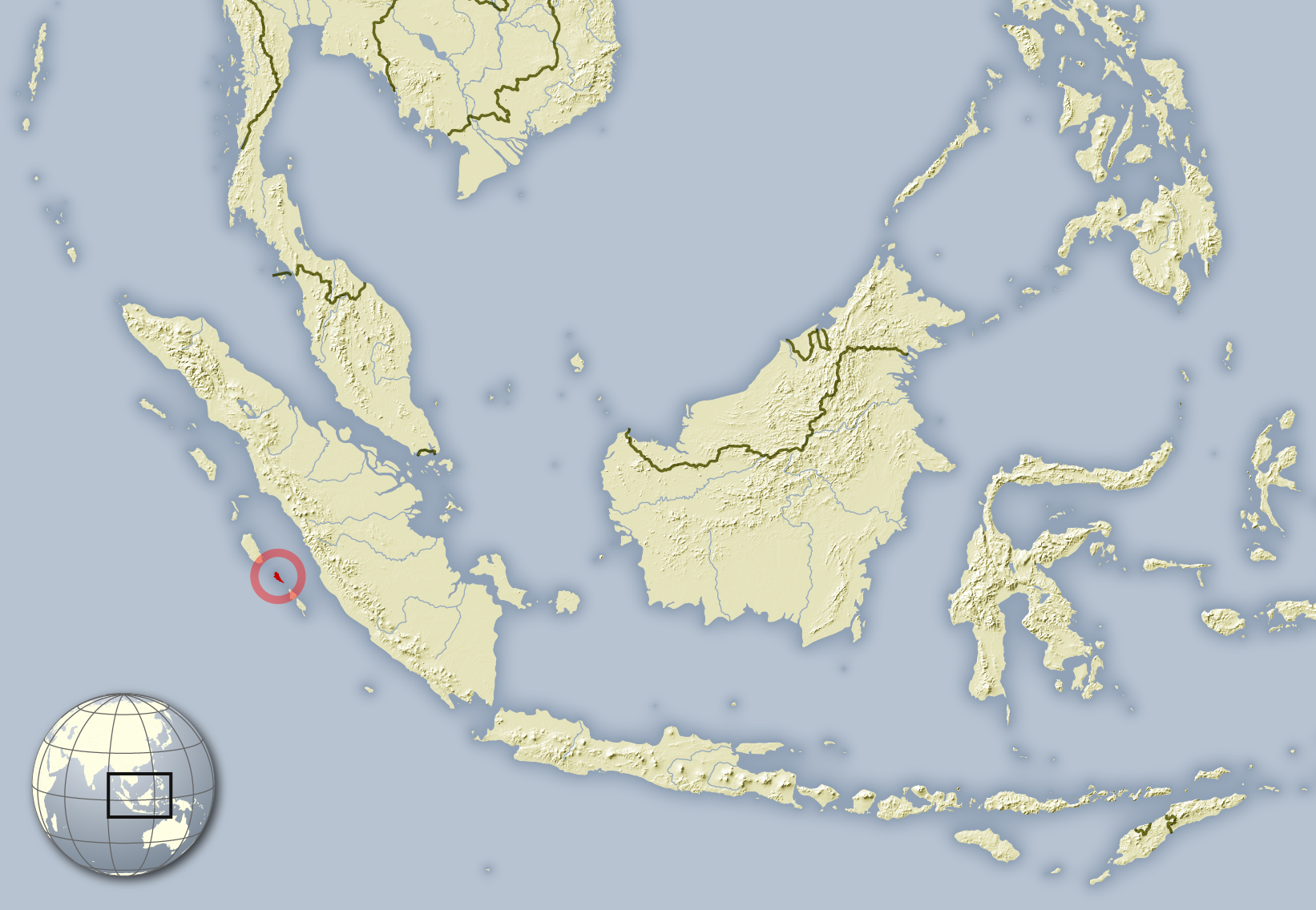
- Sipora Flying Squirrel Range Map

Species of rodent

The Sipora flying squirrel (Hylopetes sipora) is a species of rodent in the family Sciuridae. It is endemic to Indonesia. Its natural habitat is subtropical or tropical dry forests. It is threatened by habitat loss.
