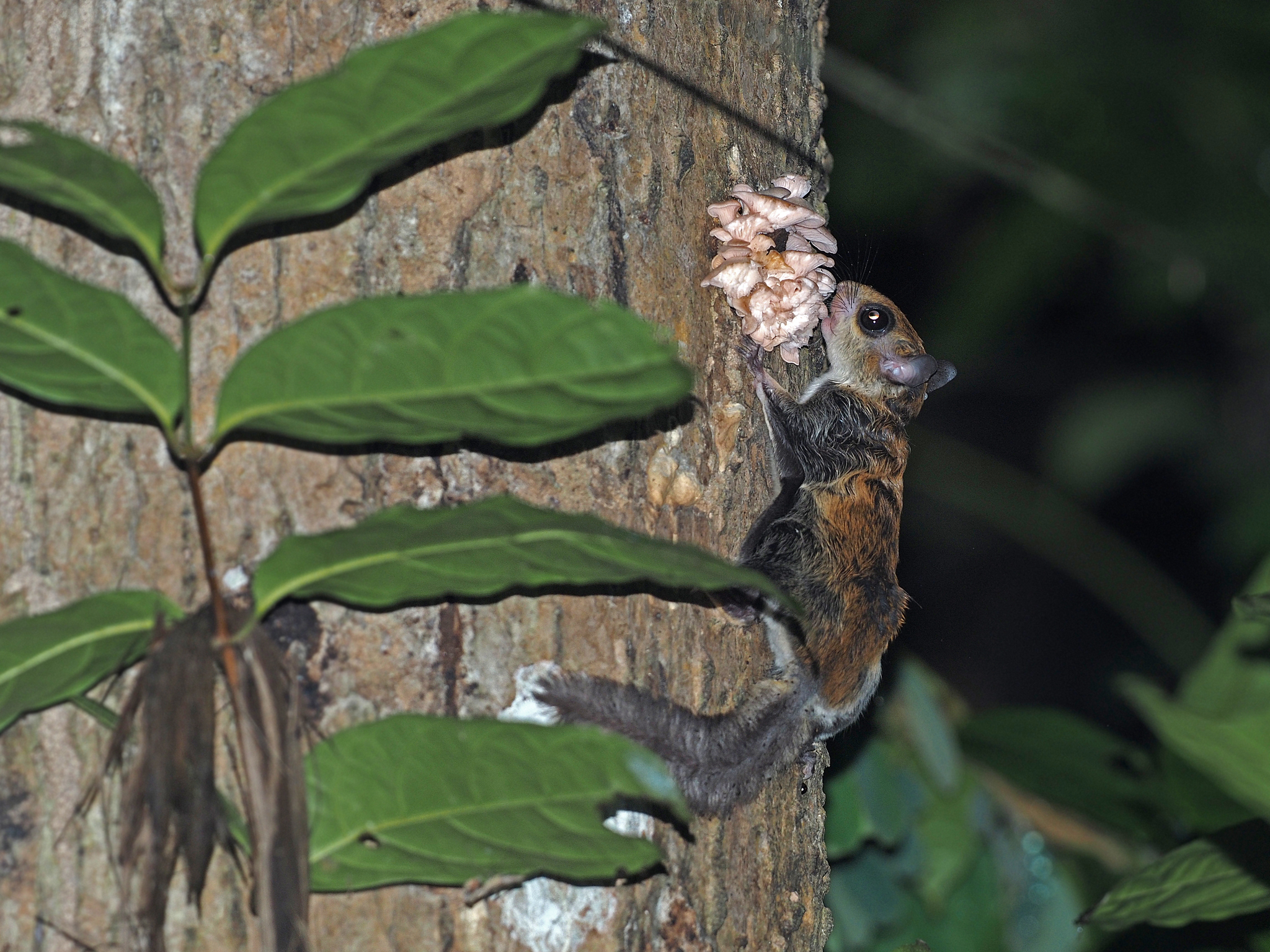

Conservation status
- Least Concern (IUCN 3.1)

Scientific classification
- Kingdom: Animalia
- Phylum: Chordata
- Class: Mammalia
- Order: Rodentia
- Family: Sciuridae
- Genus: Hylopetes
- Species: H. spadiceus

Binomial name
- Hylopetes spadiceus (Blyth, 1847)
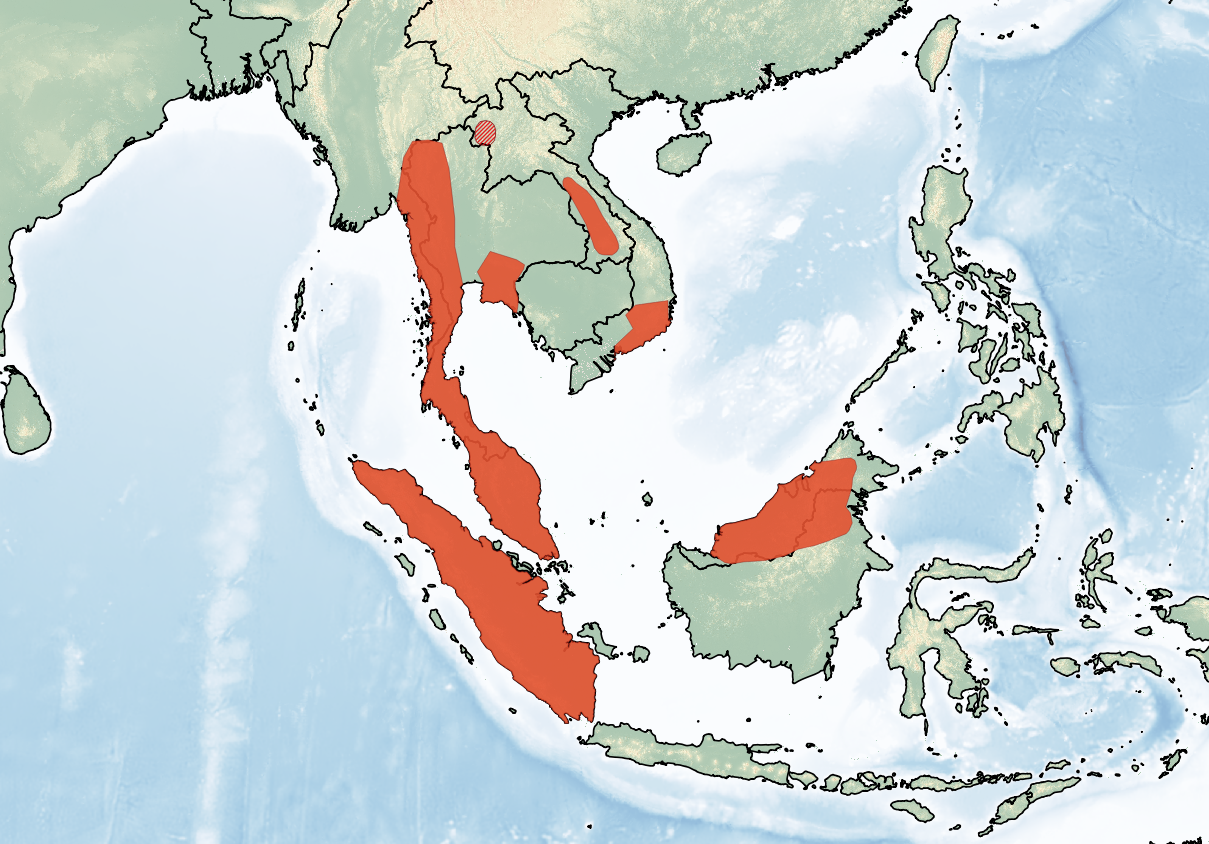

= Red-cheeked flying squirrel =

Species of rodent

The red-cheeked flying squirrel (Hylopetes spadiceus) is a species of rodent in the family Sciuridae. It is found in Indonesia, Malaysia, Myanmar, Singapore, Thailand, and Vietnam.
