= Bartel's flying squirrel =

Conservation status
- Data Deficient (IUCN 3.1)

Scientific classification
- Kingdom: Animalia
- Phylum: Chordata
- Class: Mammalia
- Order: Rodentia
- Family: Sciuridae
- Genus: Hylopetes
- Species: H. bartelsi

Binomial name
- Hylopetes bartelsi Chasen, 1939

Species of rodent

The Bartel's flying squirrel (Hylopetes bartelsi) is a rodent species in the family Sciuridae endemic to West Java, Indonesia. It inhabits subtropical and tropical forest.

== Name ==
The Bartel's flying squirrel was named after Dutch naturalist Max Eduard Gottlieb Bartels.
