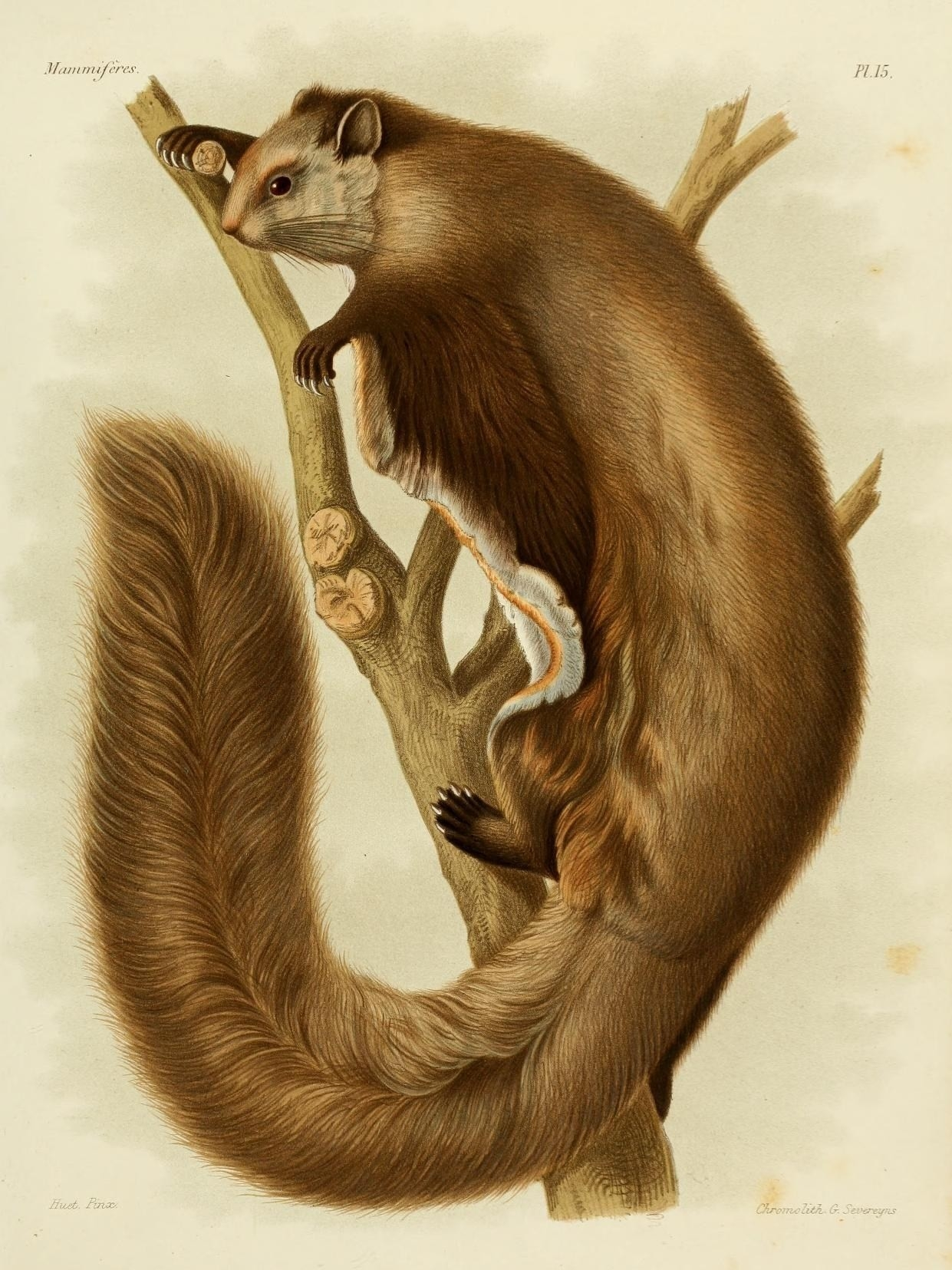

Conservation status
- Least Concern (IUCN 3.1)

Scientific classification
- Kingdom: Animalia
- Phylum: Chordata
- Class: Mammalia
- Order: Rodentia
- Family: Sciuridae
- Genus: Aeretes
- Species: A. melanopterus

Binomial name
- Aeretes melanopterus (A. Milne-Edwards, 1867)

= Groove-toothed flying squirrel =

Species of rodent

The groove-toothed flying squirrel or Colorful flying Chinese squirrel (Aeretes melanopterus) is a species of rodent in the family Sciuridae. It is the only extant species assigned to the genus Aeretes, along with two extinct species. It is endemic to China, and occurs in Sichuan, Gansu, Hebei, and Beijing. Its natural habitat is temperate forests.

== See also ==
- List of mammals of China
