= Jentink's flying squirrel =

Jentink’s flying squirrel

Conservation status
- Data Deficient (IUCN 3.1)

Scientific classification
- Domain: Eukaryota
- Kingdom: Animalia
- Phylum: Chordata
- Class: Mammalia
- Order: Rodentia
- Family: Sciuridae
- Genus: Hylopetes
- Species: H. platyurus

Binomial name
- Hylopetes platyurus Jentink, 1890
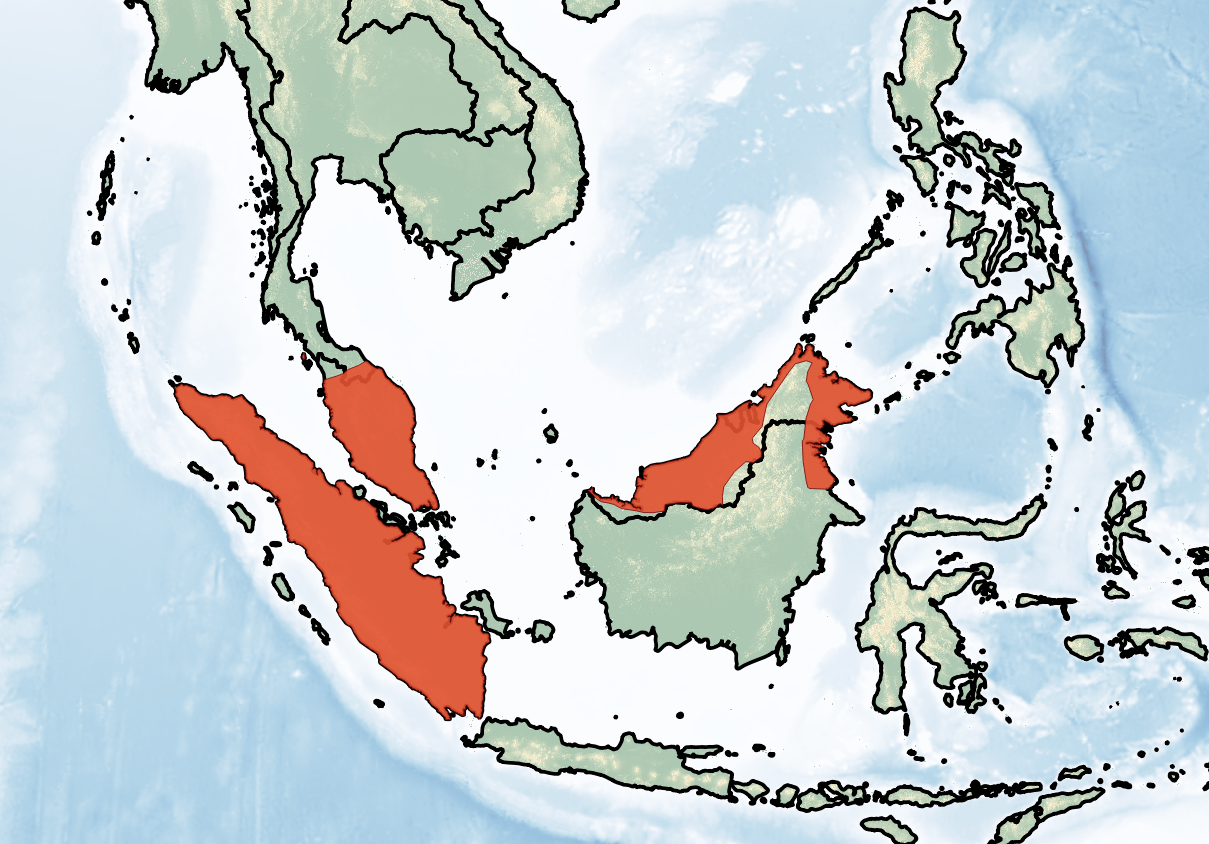

Species of mammal

The Jentink’s flying squirrel (Hylopetes platyurus) is a species of squirrel native to Indonesia and Malaysia. They are nocturnal omnivores, and have an average body length of 131.27 mm and an average body mass of 56.98 grams.
