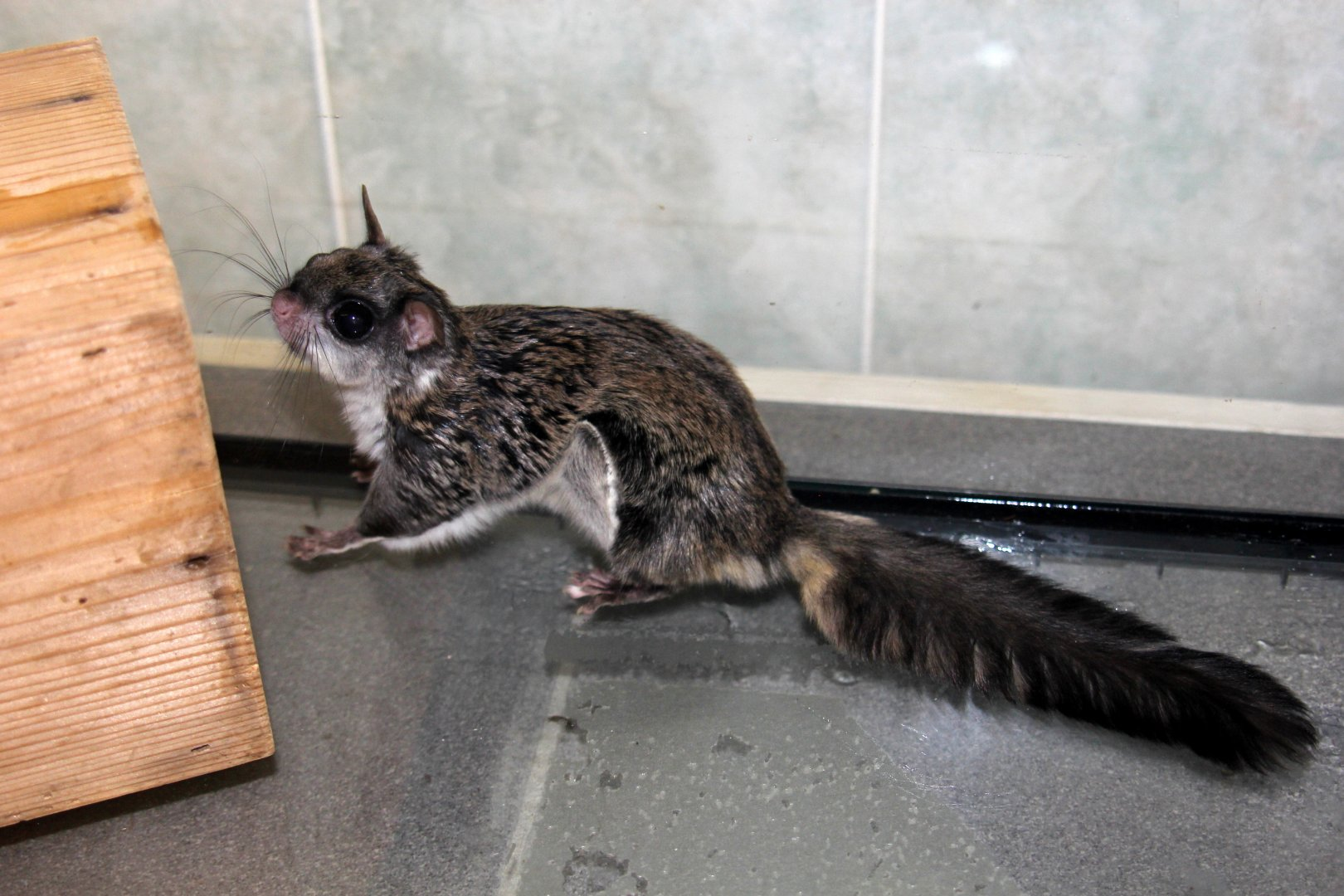

Conservation status
- Least Concern (IUCN 3.1)

Scientific classification
- Kingdom: Animalia
- Phylum: Chordata
- Class: Mammalia
- Order: Rodentia
- Family: Sciuridae
- Genus: Hylopetes
- Species: H. alboniger

Binomial name
- Hylopetes alboniger (Hodgson, 1836)
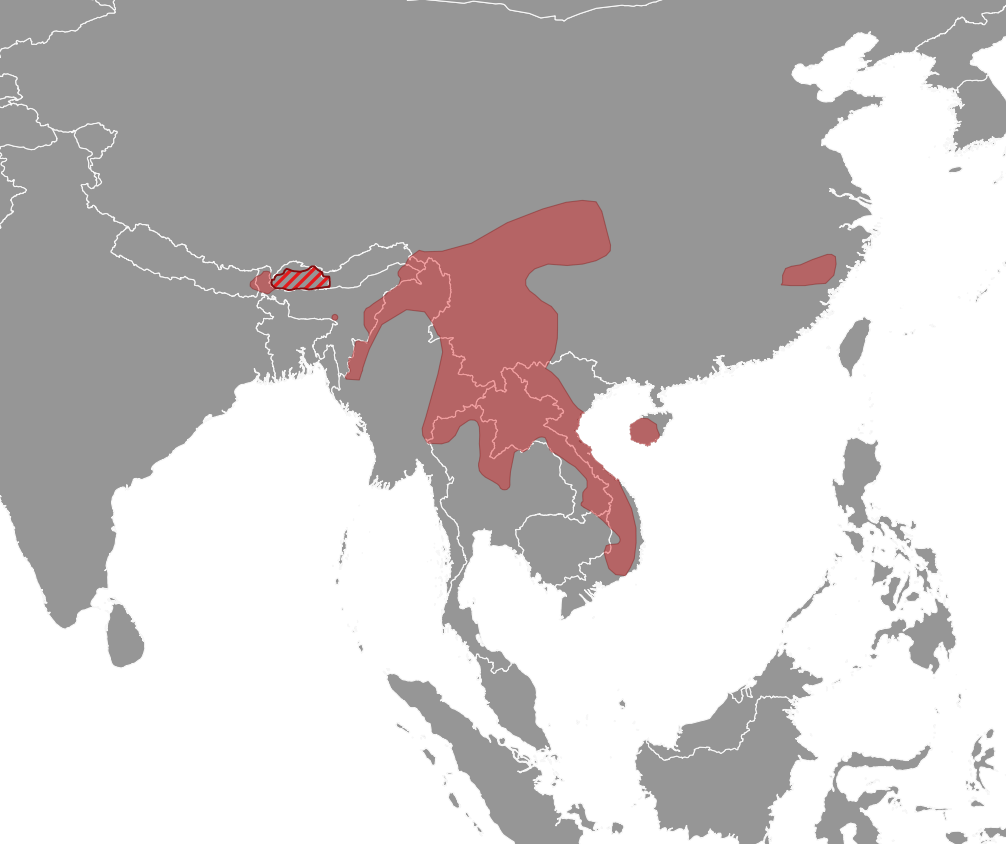

= Particolored flying squirrel =

Species of rodent

The particolored flying squirrel (Hylopetes alboniger) is a species of rodent in the family Sciuridae. It is found in Bangladesh, Bhutan, Cambodia, China, India, Laos, Myanmar, Nepal, Thailand, and Vietnam. Its natural habitat is subtropical or tropical dry forests. It is threatened by habitat loss.

The Himalayan large-eared flying squirrel (Priapomys leonardi) was formerly considered a subspecies of H. alboniger, but phylogenetic analysis revealed that it occupies a completely different place in the taxonomy of flying squirrels, and it as thus classified as a distinct species in its own genus.

== Nut Caching ==
Hylopetes alboniger is one of two squirrels (the other is Hylopetes phayrei electilis) that hang elliptical or oblate nuts securely in vegetation. They carve grooves into the nuts, using them to fix the nuts tightly between small intersecting twigs, reminiscent of the mortise-tenon joint in carpentry. Strategically, these cache sites are 10–25 m away from the nearest nut-producing tree, reducing potential theft. This behavior not only ensures secure storage but may also influence the forest's tree distribution.

This storing of nuts contrasts with squirrels in temperate zones that typically do this in ground holes or under leaf litter.
