= Lesser pygmy flying squirrel =

Conservation status
- Data Deficient (IUCN 3.1)

Scientific classification
- Kingdom: Animalia
- Phylum: Chordata
- Class: Mammalia
- Order: Rodentia
- Family: Sciuridae
- Genus: Petaurillus
- Species: P. emiliae

Binomial name
- Petaurillus emiliae Thomas, 1908

Species of rodent

The lesser pygmy flying squirrel (Petaurillus emiliae) is a species of rodent in the family Sciuridae. It is endemic to Borneo where it is known from the type specimen collected in 1901 in Sarawak (Malaysia) and another specimen collected in 2013 in Labanan Research Forest in East Kalimantan (Indonesia).

The lesser pygmy flying squirrel is arboreal and probably prefers forest. It is threatened by habitat conversion due to agriculture and logging. There are no conservation measures in place. Further studies are needed into the taxonomy, distribution, abundance, reproduction and ecology of this species.
