= Selangor pygmy flying squirrel =

Conservation status
- Data Deficient (IUCN 3.1)

Scientific classification
- Kingdom: Animalia
- Phylum: Chordata
- Class: Mammalia
- Order: Rodentia
- Family: Sciuridae
- Genus: Petaurillus
- Species: P. kinlochii

Binomial name
- Petaurillus kinlochii (Robinson & Kloss, 1911)

Species of squirrel native to Malaysia

The Selangor pygmy flying squirrel (Petaurillus kinlochii) is a species of rodent in the family Sciuridae. It is endemic to Malaysia where it has only been found in the State of Selangor.
