= Temminck's flying squirrel =

Conservation status
- Vulnerable (IUCN 3.1)

Scientific classification
- Kingdom: Animalia
- Phylum: Chordata
- Class: Mammalia
- Order: Rodentia
- Family: Sciuridae
- Genus: Petinomys
- Species: P. setosus

Binomial name
- Petinomys setosus (Temminck, 1844)
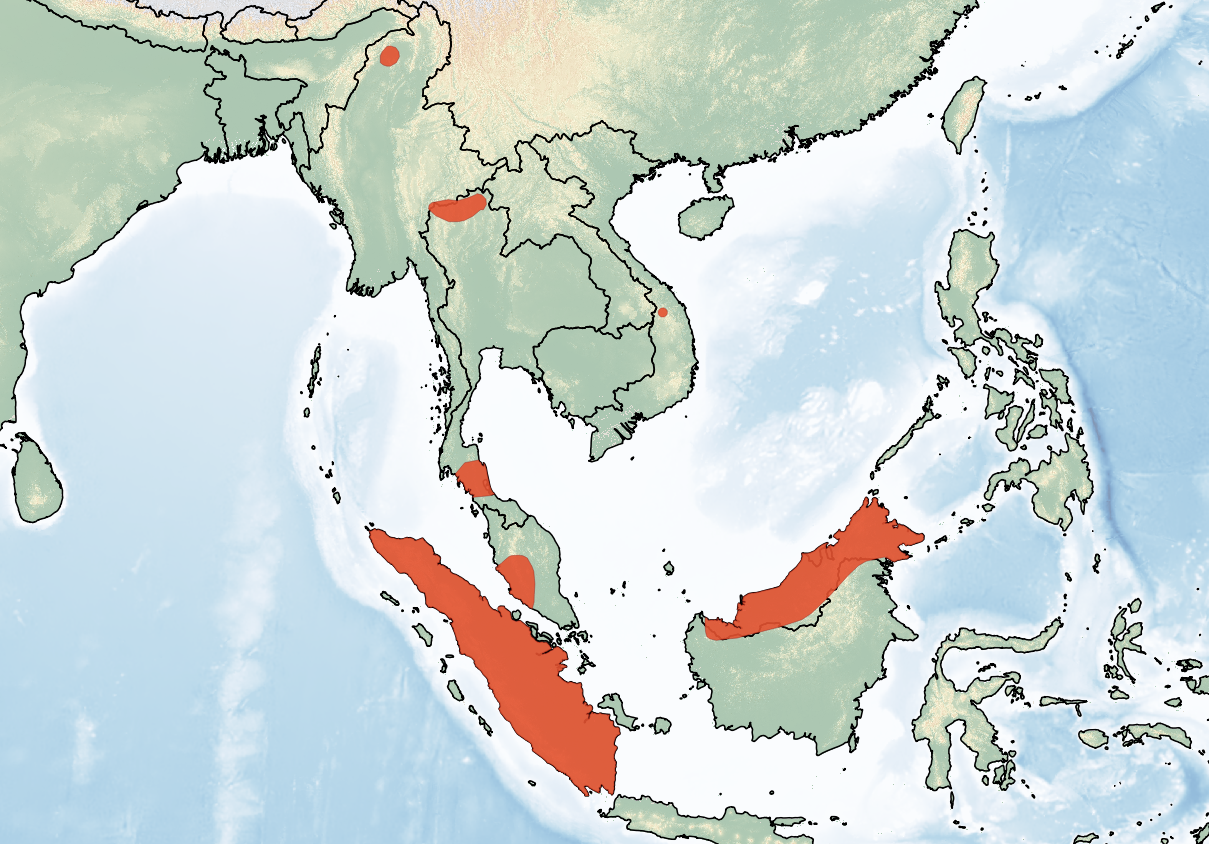

Species of rodent

Temminck's flying squirrel (Petinomys setosus) is a species of rodent in the family Sciuridae. It is found in Indonesia, Malaysia, Myanmar, and Thailand.
