= Hose's pygmy flying squirrel =

Conservation status
- Data Deficient (IUCN 3.1)

Scientific classification
- Kingdom: Animalia
- Phylum: Chordata
- Class: Mammalia
- Order: Rodentia
- Family: Sciuridae
- Genus: Petaurillus
- Species: P. hosei

Binomial name
- Petaurillus hosei (Thomas, 1900)

Species of rodent

The Hose's pygmy flying squirrel (Petaurillus hosei) is a species of rodent in the family Sciuridae. It was named for zoologist Charles Hose. It is endemic to northern Borneo where it is known from both northeastern Sarawak and Sabah (Malaysia) and from Brunei.
