= Hagen's flying squirrel =

Conservation status
- Data Deficient (IUCN 3.1)

Scientific classification
- Kingdom: Animalia
- Phylum: Chordata
- Class: Mammalia
- Order: Rodentia
- Family: Sciuridae
- Genus: Petinomys
- Species: P. hageni

Binomial name
- Petinomys hageni (Jentink, 1888)

Species of rodent

Hagen's flying squirrel (Petinomys hageni) is a species of rodent in the family Sciuridae. It is endemic to Indonesia.
