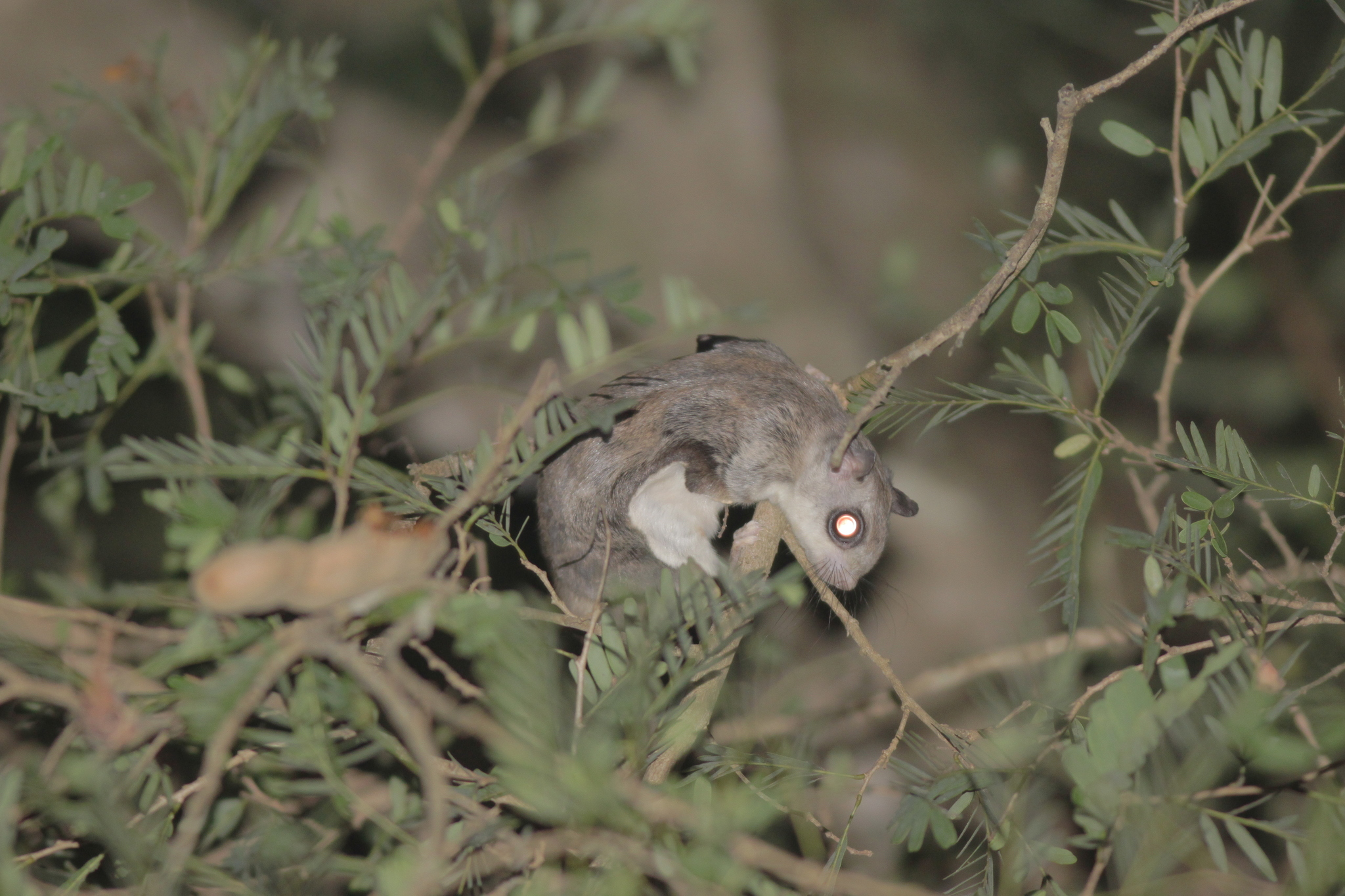

Conservation status
- Least Concern (IUCN 3.1)

Scientific classification
- Kingdom: Animalia
- Phylum: Chordata
- Class: Mammalia
- Order: Rodentia
- Family: Sciuridae
- Genus: Hylopetes
- Species: H. phayrei

Binomial name
- Hylopetes phayrei (Blyth, 1859)
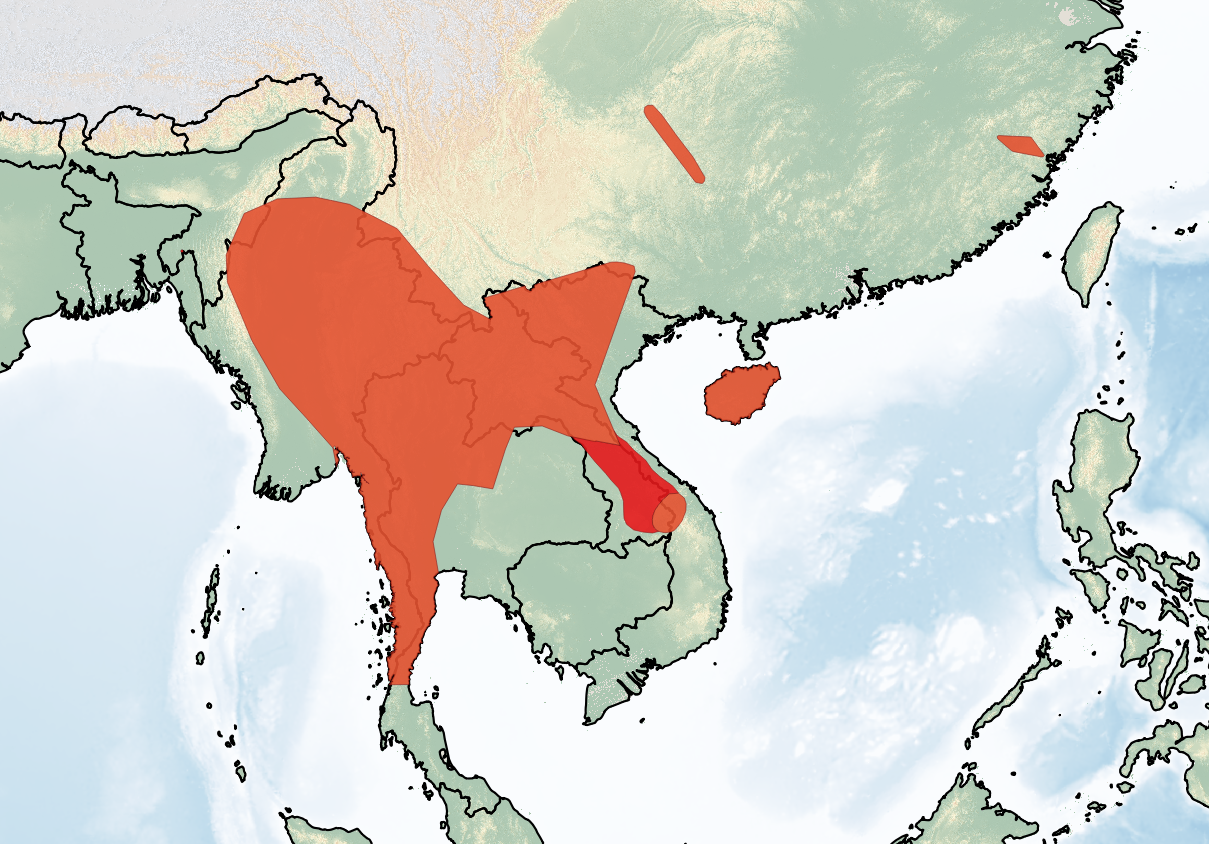

= Indochinese flying squirrel =

Species of rodent

The Indochinese flying squirrel (Hylopetes phayrei), also known as Phayre's flying squirrel, is a species of rodent in the family Sciuridae. It is found in China, Laos, Myanmar, Thailand, and Vietnam.
