= Namdapha National Park =

National park in Arunachal Pradesh, India

- IUCN category II (national park)
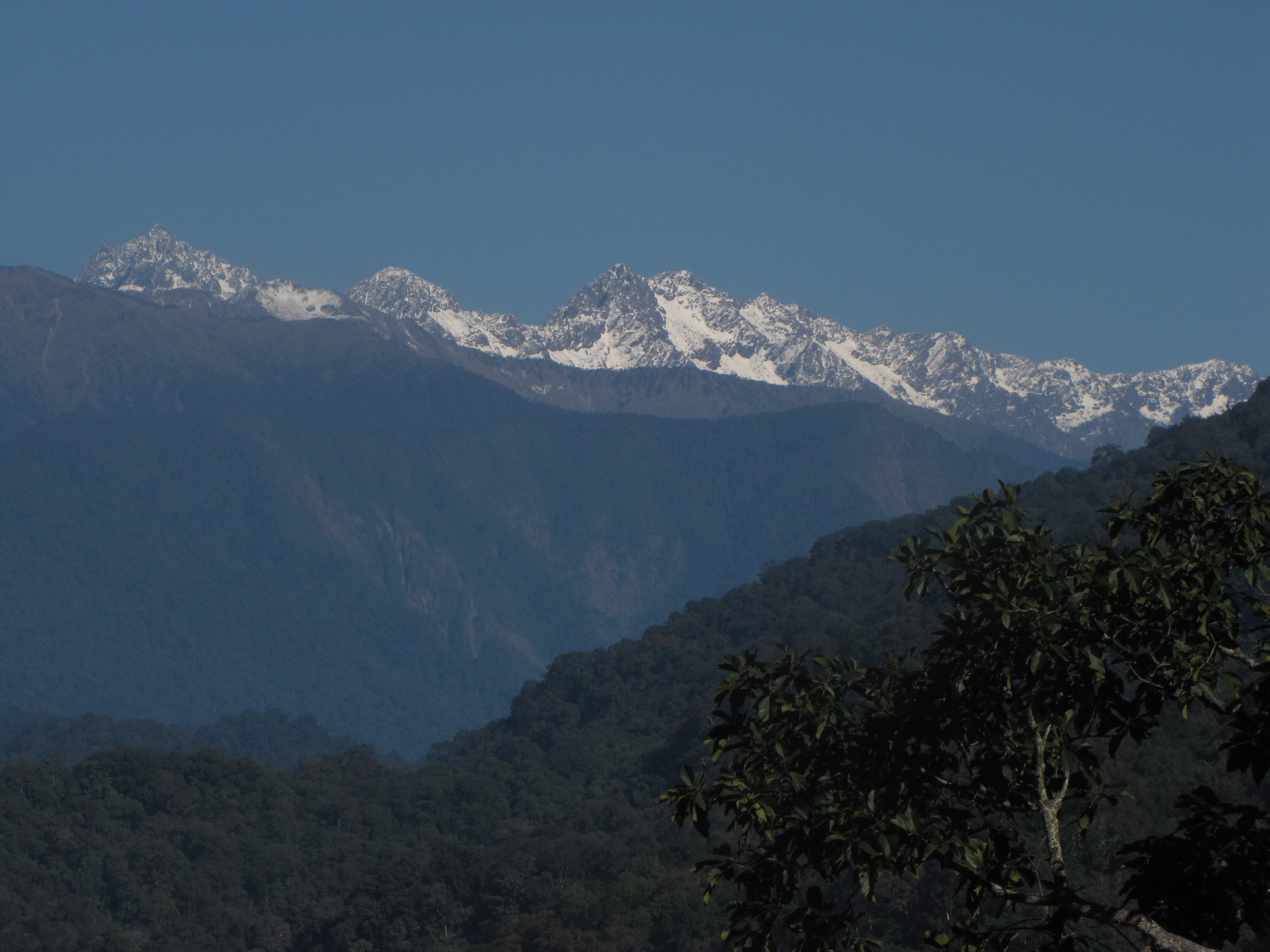
- Canopy cover of Namdapha National Park

- Location within Arunachal Pradesh Location within India
- Interactive map of Namdapha National Park
- Location: Changlang district, Arunachal Pradesh, India
- Nearest city: Miao
- Coordinates: 27°29′00″N 96°23′00″E
- Area: 1,985.23 km^{2} (766.50 sq mi)
- Established: 1974
- Governing body: Government of Arunachal Pradesh, Government of India
- Website: arunachalforests.gov.in/Namdapha%20Tiger%20Reserve.html

Namdapha National Park is a 1,985.23 km^{2} (766.50 sq mi) large national park in Arunachal Pradesh of Northeast India. The park was established in 1983. With more than 1,000 floral and about 1,400 faunal species, it is a biodiversity hotspot in the Eastern Himalayas. It harbours the northernmost lowland evergreen rainforests in the world at 27°N latitude. It also harbours extensive dipterocarp forests, comprising the northwestern parts of the Mizoram-Manipur-Kachin rain forests ecoregion.

It is the fourth largest national park in India. In 2024, it was declared as a Eco-Sensitive Zone.

== History ==
Namdapha was originally declared a wildlife sanctuary in 1972, a national park in 1983 and became a tiger reserve under Project Tiger in the same year. Its name was a combination of two Singpho words, namely "nam" which means water, and "dapha" which means origin; The park is located between the Dapha bum range of the Mishmi Hills and the Patkai range.

== Geography and vegetation ==
Namdapha National Park is located in Changlang district of the Northeast Indian state of Arunachal Pradesh, near the international border with Myanmar. It spans an area of 1,985 km^{2} (766 sq mi) including a core area of 1,808 km^{2} (698 sq mi) and a surrounding buffer zone of 177 km^{2} (68 sq mi). It is located between the Dapha bum range of the Mishmi Hills and the Patkai range with a wide elevation range between 200 and 4,571 m (656 and 14,997 ft). It is crossed from east to west by the Noa Dihing River that originates at the Chaukan Pass on the Indo-Myanmar border. The land cover changes with increasing elevation from tropical evergreen forest to temperate broadleaf and mixed forest. Secondary forests cover 345.47 km^{2} (133.39 sq mi); seasonal snow occurs above 2,700 m (8,900 ft) between December and March.

== Flora ==
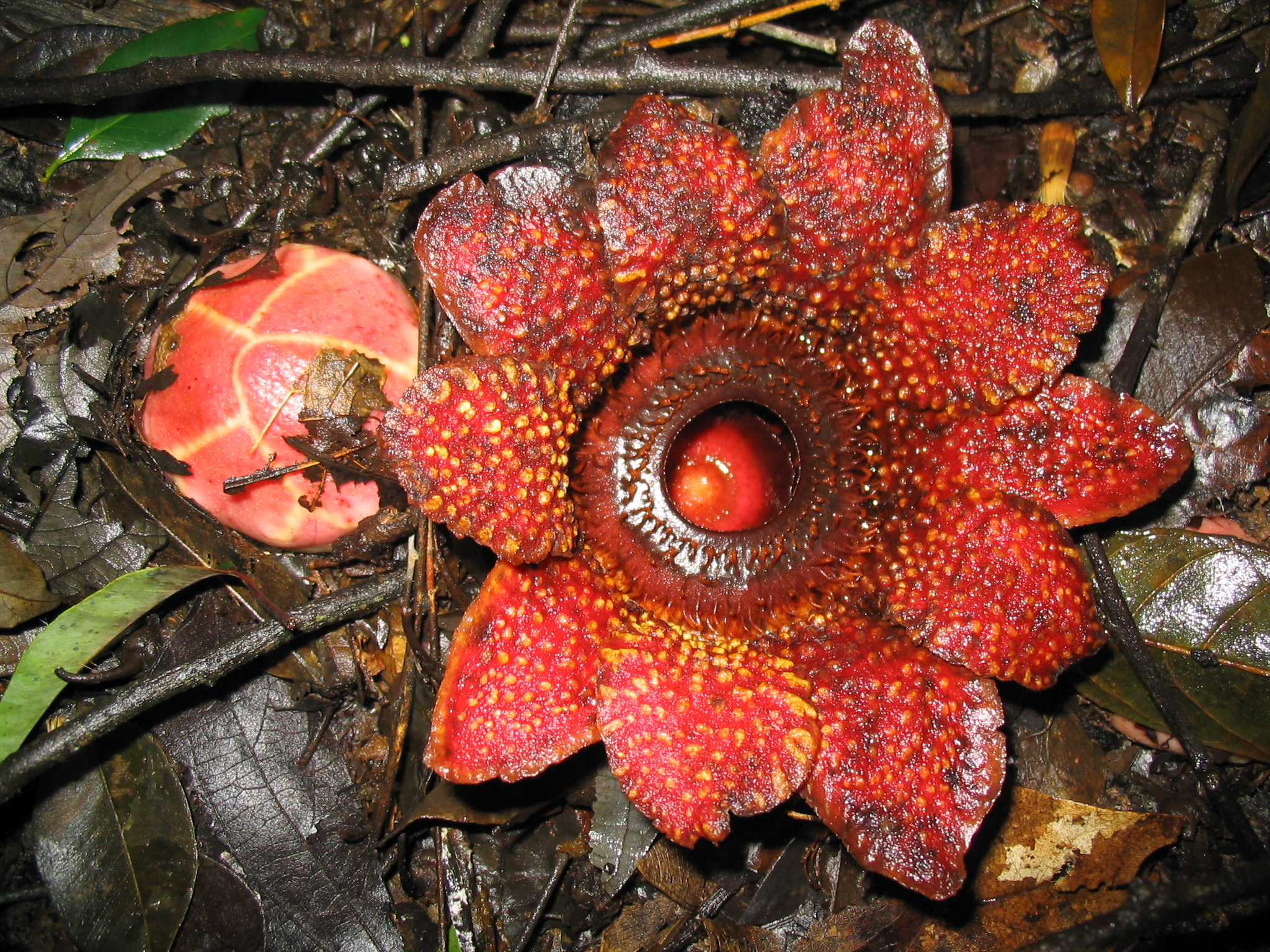
Flower of Sapria himalayana

Sapria himalayana and Balanophora are root parasites related to Rafflesia recorded from the area. The floristic diversity of Namdapha is as follows:

Floristic Composition of Namdapha National Park
Category (total no.)	Dicots	Monocots	Lichens	Bryophytes	Pteridophytes	Gymnosperms
Families (215)	119 (55.35)	19 (8.84)	17 (7.90)	21 (9.77)	36 (16.74)	3 (1.4)
Genera (639)	403 (63)	111 (17.37)	34 (5.32)	33 (5.16)	54 (8.45)	4 (0.63)
Species (1119)	674 (60.25)	196 (17.5)	73 (6.53)	59 (5.27)	112 (10)	5 (0.66)

Values in parentheses are percentage of total number.

== Fauna ==
=== Mammals ===
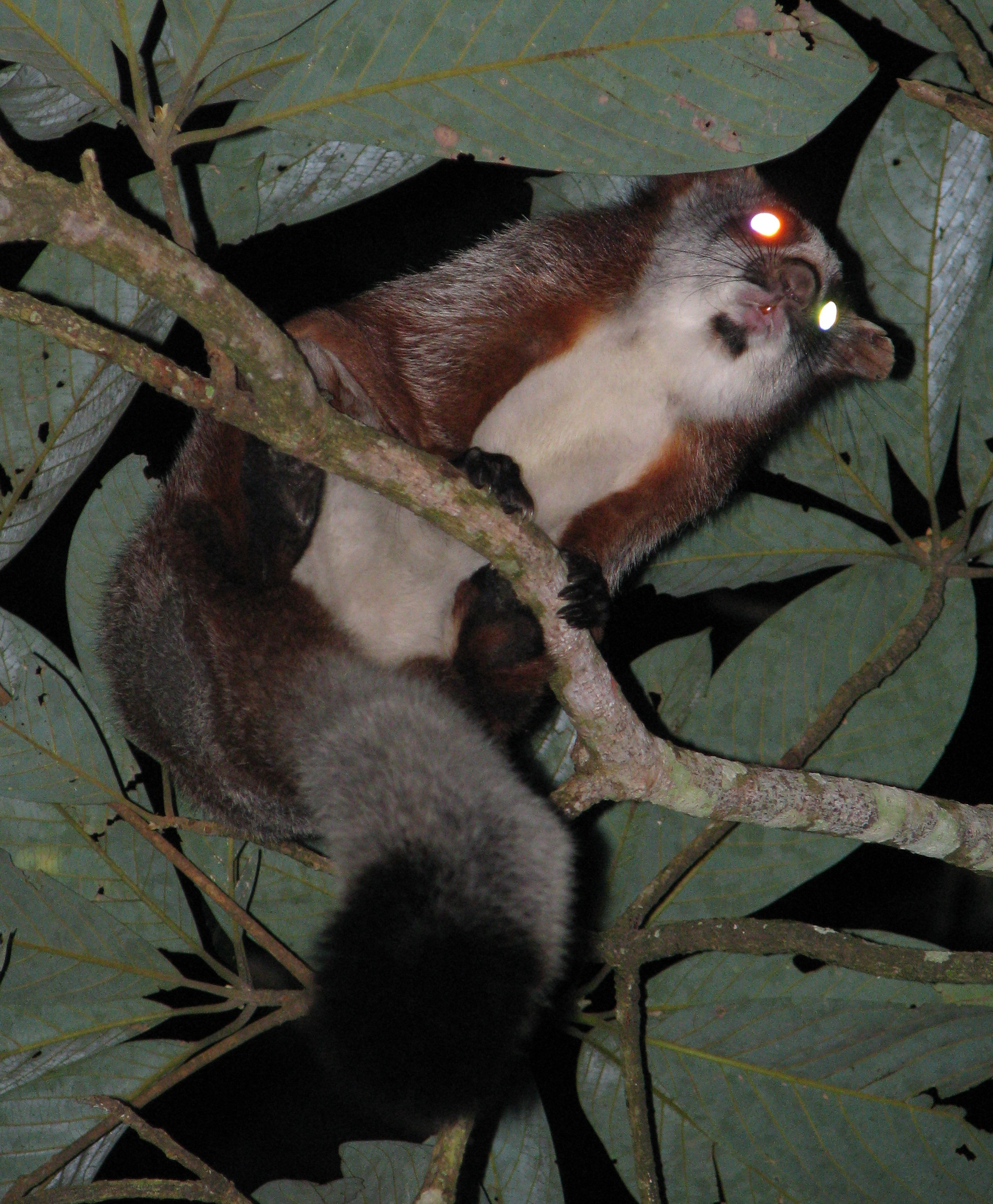
Red giant flying squirrel

The Namdapha flying squirrel (Biswamoyopterus biswasi) was first collected in the park and described. It is endemic to the park and critically endangered. It was last recorded in 1981 in a single valley within the park.

Because of the elevation range from 300 to 4,500 m (980 to 14,760 ft) and vegetation zones from evergreen, moist deciduous to temperate broadleaved and coniferous forest types to alpine vegetation, the park is home to a great diversity of mammal species. Four pantherines occur in the park: leopard (Panthera pardus), snow leopard (P. uncia), tiger (P. tigris) and clouded leopard (Neofelis nebulosa).

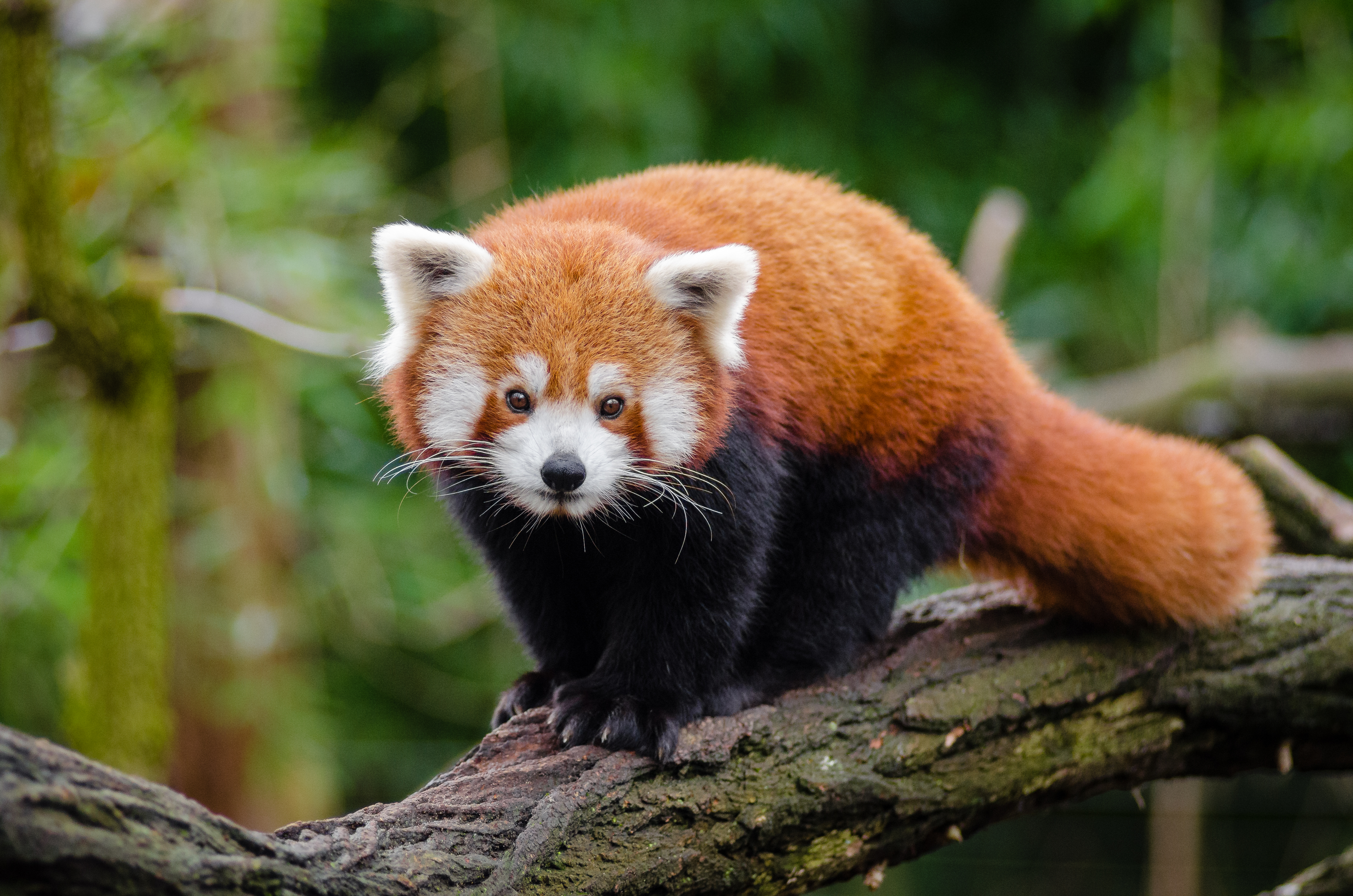
Red panda

Other predators present in the protected area are dhole, Malayan sun bear, Indian wolf and Asiatic black bear. Smaller mammals include red panda, red fox, yellow-throated marten, Eurasian otter, Asian small-clawed otter, spotted linsang, binturong, Asian palm civet, small Indian civet, large Indian civet, masked palm civet, marbled cat,Asian golden cat and two mongoose species. Large herbivores are represented by Indian elephant, wild boar, musk deer, Indian muntjac, hog deer, sambar, gaur, goral, mainland serow, takin and bharal. Primates present include stump-tailed macaque, slow loris, hoolock gibbon, capped langur, Assamese macaque and rhesus macaque.

=== Birds ===
Among the earlier papers on the birds of Namdapha was published in 1990. The park has about 425 bird species, with many more to be recorded from work in the higher areas. There are six species of hornbills recorded from the area. Several species of rare wren-babblers have been recorded in Namdapha. Other bird groups include laughing thrushes, parrotbills, fulvettas, shrike babblers and scimitar babblers. The snowythroated babbler is a rare species of babbler found only in the Patkai and Mishmi Hills and nearby areas in Northern Myanmar, is found in Namdapha. Other rare, restricted range or globally endangered species include the rufous-necked hornbill, green cochoa, purple cochoa, beautiful nuthatch, Ward's trogon, ruddy kingfisher, blue-eared kingfisher, white-tailed fish eagle, Eurasian hobby, pied falconet, white-winged wood duck, Himalayan wood-owl, rufous-throated hill-partridge, and whitecheeked hill partridge. Several leaf warblers and migrants such as amur falcon and several thrushes can be seen here. The first mid-winter waterfowl census in Namdapha was conducted in 1994 when species such as the white-bellied heron, a critically endangered bird, was recorded for the first time.

=== Butterflies and moths ===
The region is very rich in Lepidoptera species. Both butterflies and moths are found in equal abundance here, along with a variety of other insects. As per the observations taken during the National Camp organised in October 2014 by Bombay Natural History Society, a lot of rare species of butterflies were seen. These include the koh-i-noor, naga treebrown, red caliph, cruiser, wizard, fluffy tit, East Himalayan purple emperor.

== See also ==
- Tourism in North East India
- Wildlife of India
