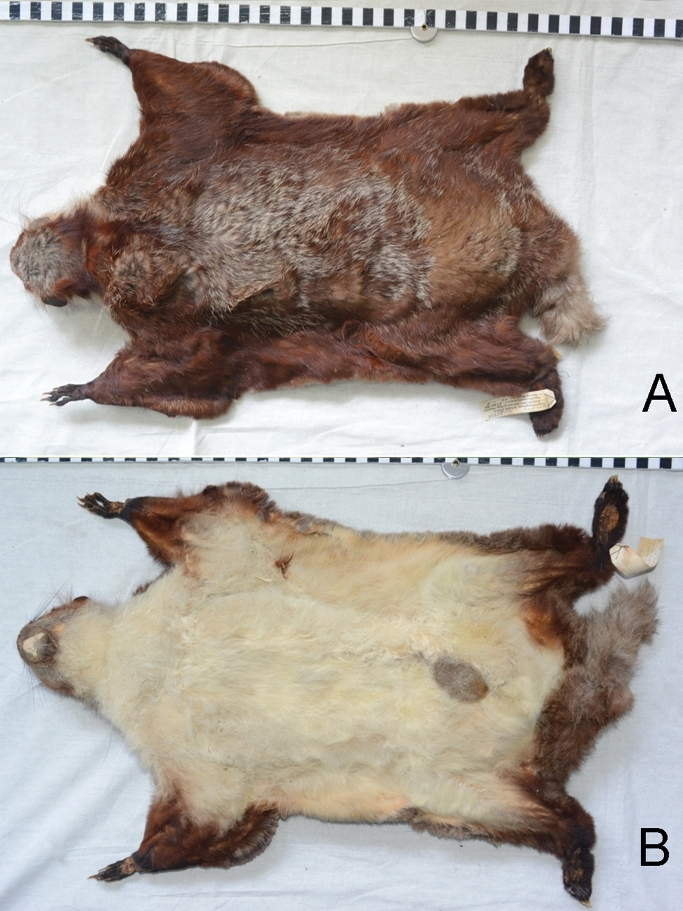
- Holotype of the Namdapha flying squirrel, viewed from above and below

Conservation status
- Critically Endangered (IUCN 3.1)

Scientific classification
- Kingdom: Animalia
- Phylum: Chordata
- Class: Mammalia
- Infraclass: Placentalia
- Order: Rodentia
- Family: Sciuridae
- Genus: Biswamoyopterus
- Species: B. biswasi

Binomial name
- Biswamoyopterus biswasi Saha, 1981

= Namdapha flying squirrel =

Species of rodent

The Namdapha flying squirrel (Biswamoyopterus biswasi) is a flying squirrel endemic to Arunachal Pradesh in northeast India, where it is known from a single zoological specimen collected in Namdapha National Park in 1981.

== Description ==
The Namdapha flying squirrel has reddish, grizzled fur with white above and a pale grey crown; its patagium is orangish and its underparts are white. Its cheek teeth are simple, and its incisors are unpigmented. Septae are multiple in auditory bullae and sometimes honeycomb-shaped with 10 to 12 cells in it. It measures 40.5 cm (15.9 in) from head-to-vent and has a 60 cm (24 in) long tail. The hindfoot is 7.8 cm (3.1 in), and the ear is 4.6 cm (1.8 in) long.

== Taxonomy ==
The Namdapha flying squirrel was first described in 1981, based on a single zoological specimen collected in Namdapha National Park. Its scientific name commemorates Biswamoy Biswas, director of the Zoological Survey of India. It was the first member of the genus Biswamoyopterus; in 2013, the Laotian giant flying squirrel (Biswamoyopterus laoensis) was described. In 2018, a new flying squirrel, the Mount Gaoligong flying squirrel (Biswamoyopterus gaoligongensis) was discovered in China.

== Distribution and habitat ==
The Namdapha flying squirrel is endemic to Arunachal Pradesh in northeast India. It inhabits tall Mesua ferrea jungles, often on hill slopes in the drainage basin area of Dihing River, particularly on the western slope of Patkai range in northeastern India.

In April 2022, a putative Namdapha flying squirrel was recorded in Arunachal Pradesh. To prove its validity, the researchers are planning to collect fecal samples for identification of DNA.

Field observations suggest that the Namdapha flying squirrel primarily feeds on young leaves and shoots in the upper canopy of subtropical evergreen forests, indicating a folivorous diet closely tied to mature forest habitat. This canopy-dependent feeding behavior highlights the importance of intact old-growth trees and continuous canopy cover for its survival, as these provide both food resources and gliding pathways.

== Status ==
The Namdapha flying squirrel is listed as critically endangered on the IUCN Red List. Its range may be restricted to a single valley, and it is threatened by poaching of animals for food within the park, and possibly by habitat destruction. It is among the 25 "most wanted lost" species that are the focus of Re:wild's "Search for Lost Species" initiative.
