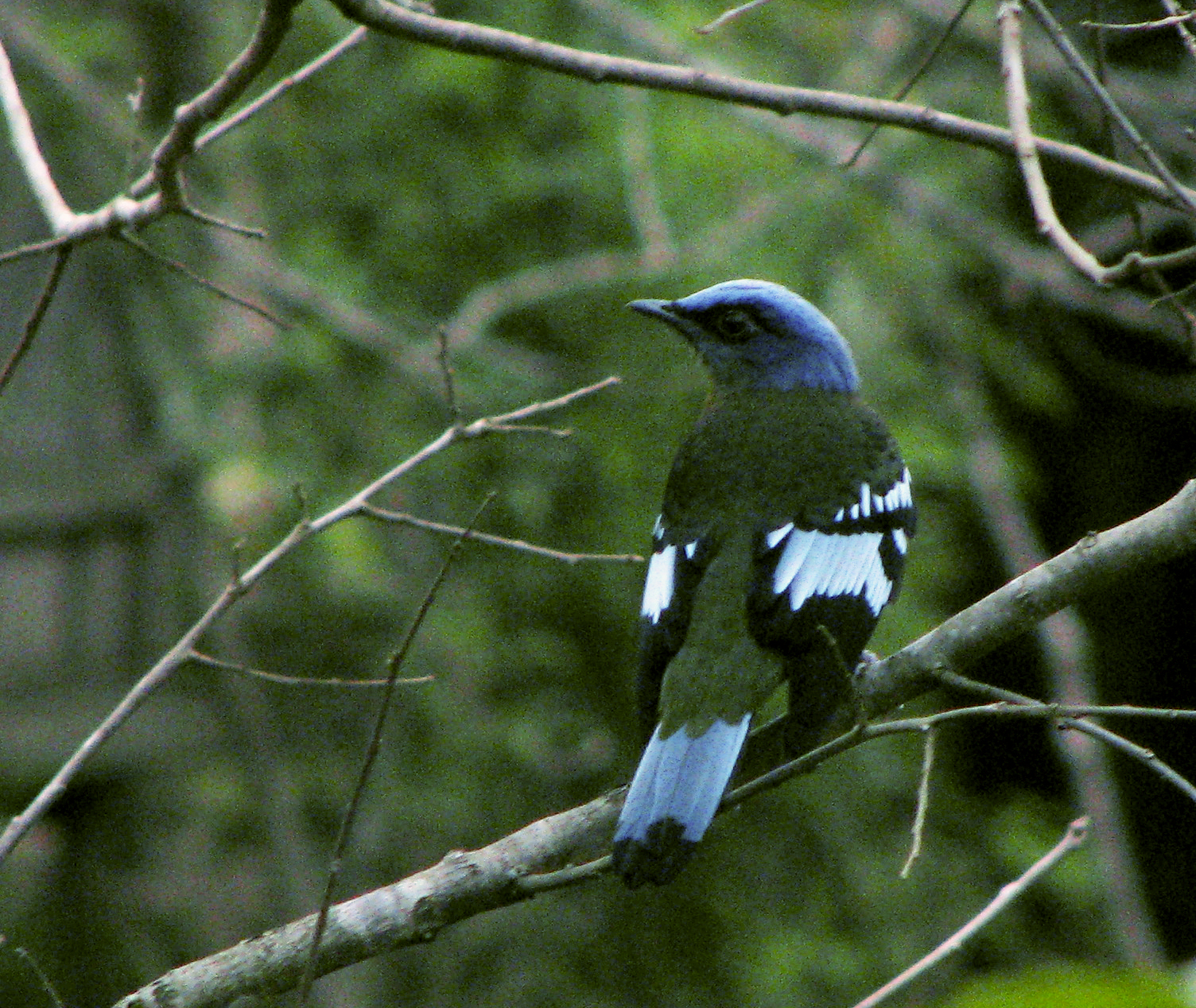
- Green cochoa (Cochoa viridis)

Scientific classification
- Kingdom: Animalia
- Phylum: Chordata
- Class: Aves
- Order: Passeriformes
- Family: Turdidae
- Genus: Cochoa; Hodgson, 1836

Type species
- Cochoa purpurea Hodgson, 1836

Species
- Cochoa purpurea Cochoa viridis Cochoa beccarii Cochoa azurea

= Cochoa =

Cochoas

Genus of birds

The cochoas (from cocho, Nepali for Cochoa purpurea) are medium-sized frugivorous, insectivorous and molluscivorous birds in the genus Cochoa. Their bright contrasting plumage patterns, sexual dimorphism and feeding habits made their systematic position difficult to ascertain in early times, Richard Bowdler Sharpe placed them with the Prionopidae in 1879 while many considered them as some kind of aberrant thrush. The genus was previously included in the Old World flycatcher family Muscicapidae but molecular phylogenetic studies have shown that it is more closely related to the thrush family Turdidae.

== Species ==
These are southeast Asian forest-dwelling species, often found near water. The genus contains the following four species:

Image	Common name	Scientific name	Distribution
	Purple cochoa	Cochoa purpurea	Bangladesh, Bhutan, China, India, Laos, Myanmar, Nepal, Thailand, and Vietnam
	Green cochoa	Cochoa viridis	Cambodia, China, India, Laos, Myanmar, Nepal, Thailand, Vietnam, and possibly Bhutan.
	Sumatran cochoa	Cochoa beccarii	Indonesia.
	Javan cochoa	Cochoa azurea	Indonesia.

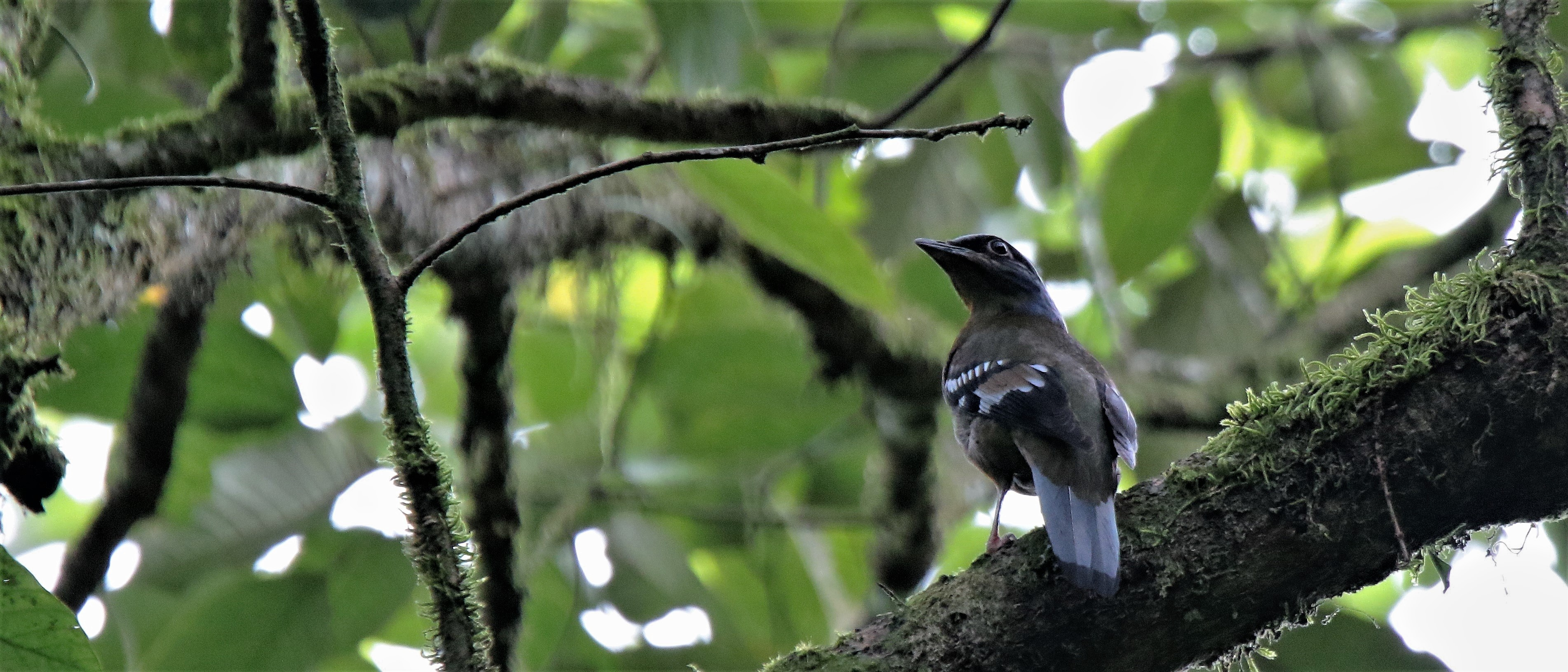

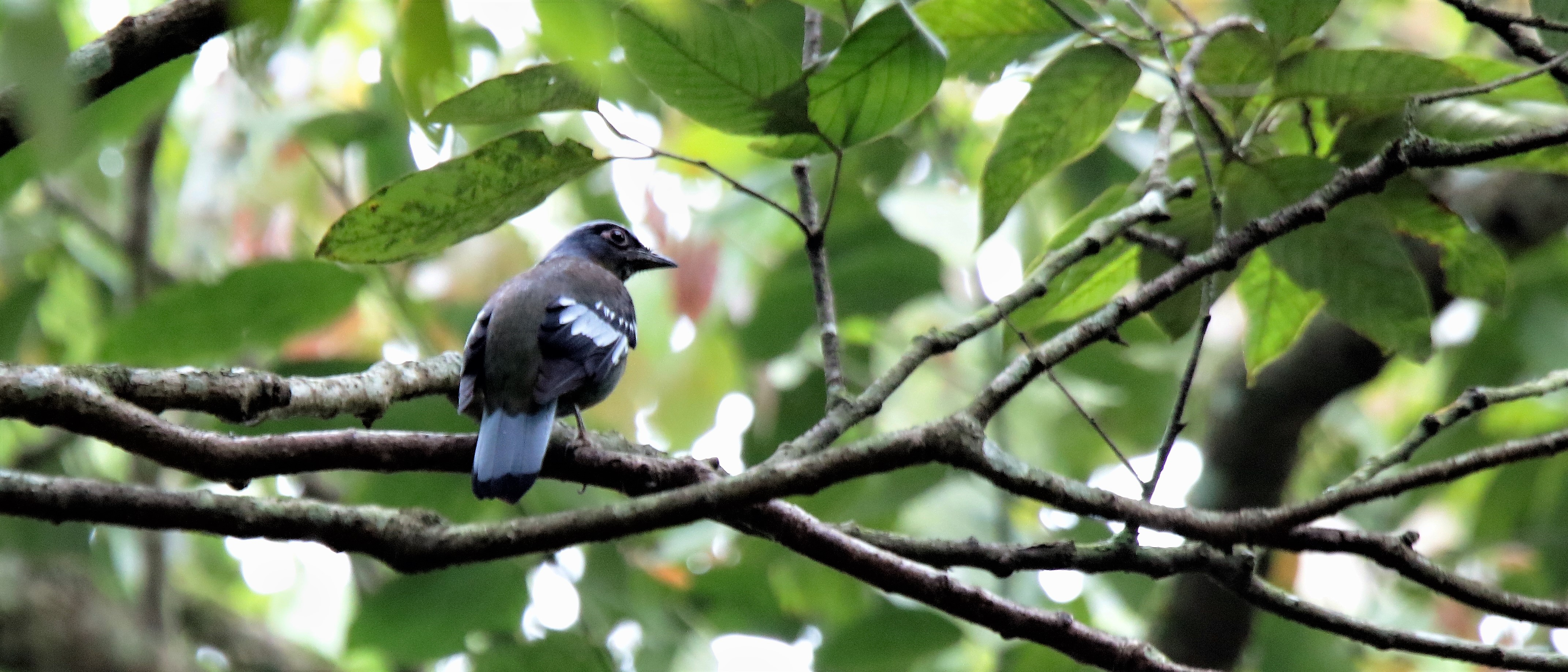
