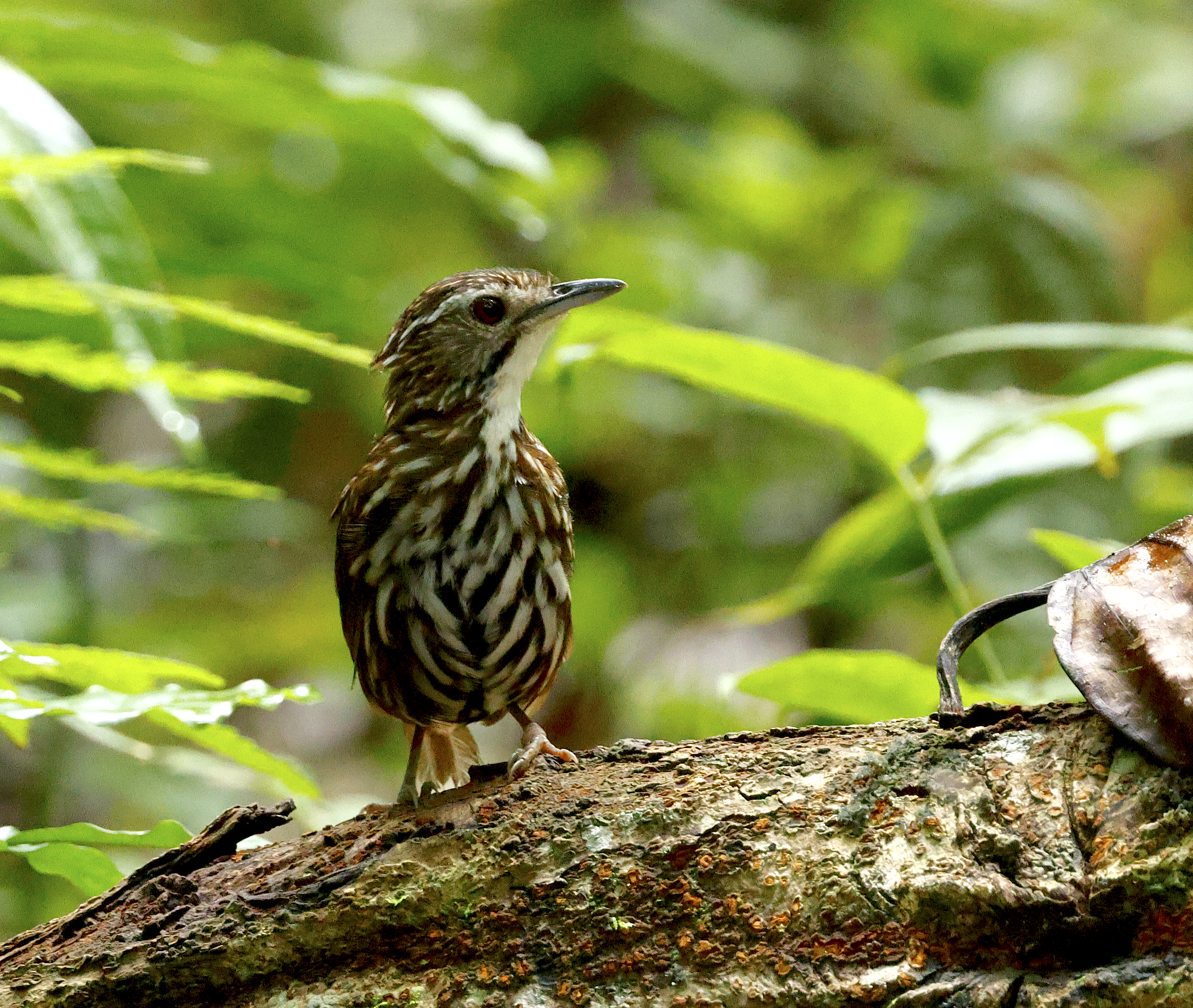
- ssp. fortichi
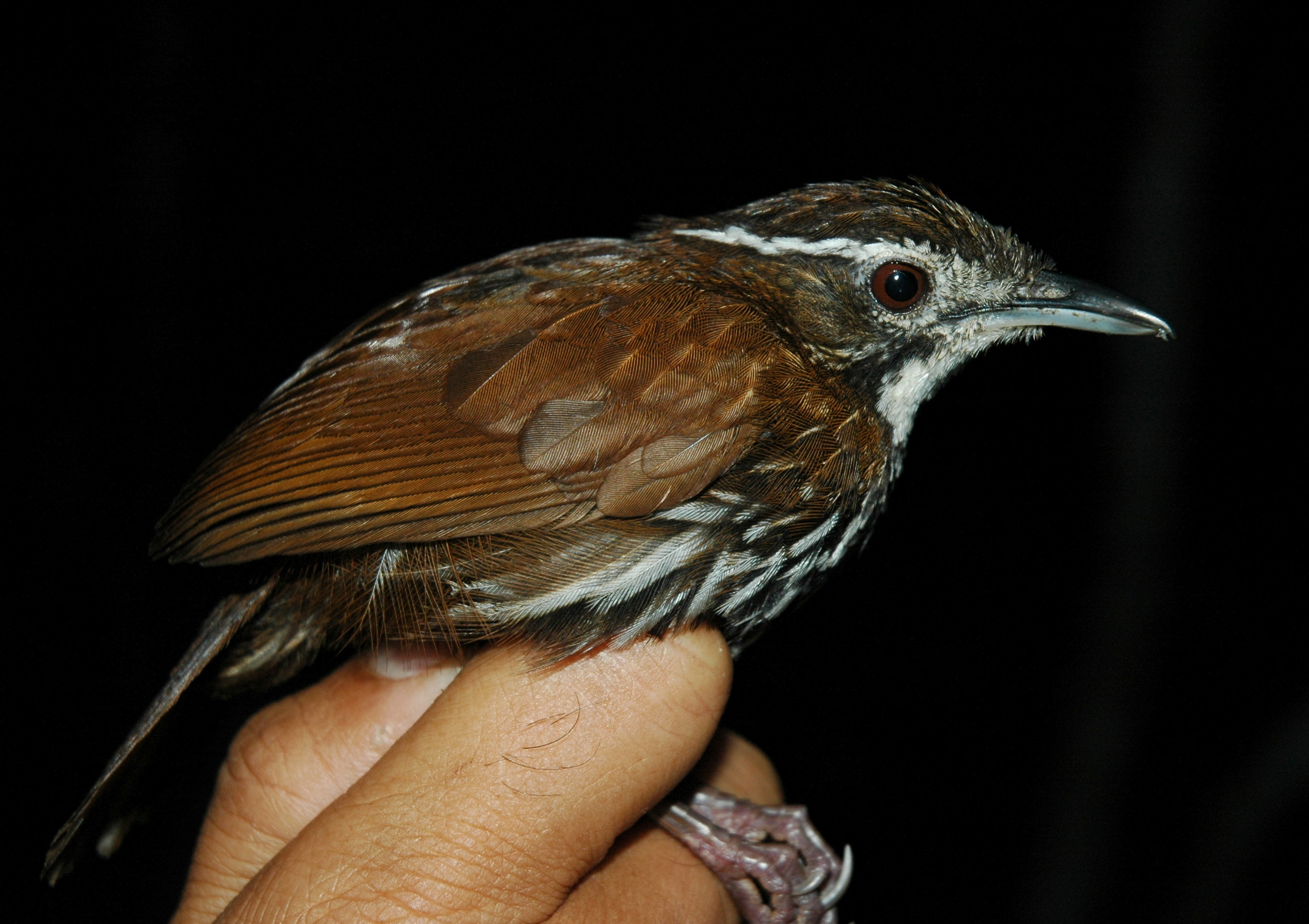
- ssp. mindanensis

Conservation status
- Least Concern (IUCN 3.1)

Scientific classification
- Kingdom: Animalia
- Phylum: Chordata
- Class: Aves
- Order: Passeriformes
- Family: Pellorneidae
- Genus: Ptilocichla
- Species: P. mindanensis

Binomial name
- Ptilocichla mindanensis (Blasius, 1890)

= Striated wren-babbler =

Species of bird

The striated wren-babbler (Ptilocichla mindanensis) is a species of passerine bird in the Pellorneidae family. It is endemic to the Philippines found on the islands of Bohol, Samar, Leyte, Basilan, Dinagat Islands and Mindanao. Its natural habitats are tropical moist lowland forest and the lower reaches of tropical moist montane forest.

== Description and taxonomy ==
This species is described as a small bird of the lowland forest floor. It is warm brown on the upperparts, sides and crown. It has fine light brown streaks on the side and then heavy white streaking on its underparts. It has a white throat patch, a white eye strip and a black-and-white moustachial stripe. Like all wren-babblers it is short tailed.

=== Subspecies ===
Four subspecies are recognized:

- P. m mindanensis – Found on Mindanao except Zamboanga Peninsula; pale streaking
- P. m. basilanica – Found on Zamboanga Peninsula and Basilan; similar to the nominate with pale streaking and back
- P. m. minuta – Found on Leyte and Samar; smaller wih darker shaft streaks
- P. m. fortichi – Found on Bohol; similar to minuta but crown and back is darker

== Ecology and behavior ==
It is presumed to feed on invertebrates and are usually found singly but can form small parties of up to 4 individuals. Forages on the forest floor and turns over leaves in search of insects.

Breeds in January to August. Nest is described as a dome shaped cup made of dead leaves. roots and small twigs on the forest floor or up to 3 meters high in the leaf base of palms. Lays 1 bluish tinged white egg with brown spotting and lines.

== Habitat and conservation status ==
It is found in tropical moist lowland forest with dense understory up to 1,400 meters above sea level but more common below 1,000 meters. Forages in the low forest floor and turning over leaves.

IUCN has assessed this bird as least-concern species but the population is decreasing. This species' main threat is habitat loss with wholesale clearance of forest habitats as a result of logging, agricultural conversion and mining activities occurring within the range. The most affected part of its range is Bohol which only has 4% forest cover remaining.

Occurs in a few protected areas like Pasonanca Natural Park, Mount Apo and Mount Kitanglad on Mindanao, Rajah Sikatuna Protected Landscape in Bohol and Samar Island Natural Park but actual protection and enforcement from illegal logging and hunting are lax
