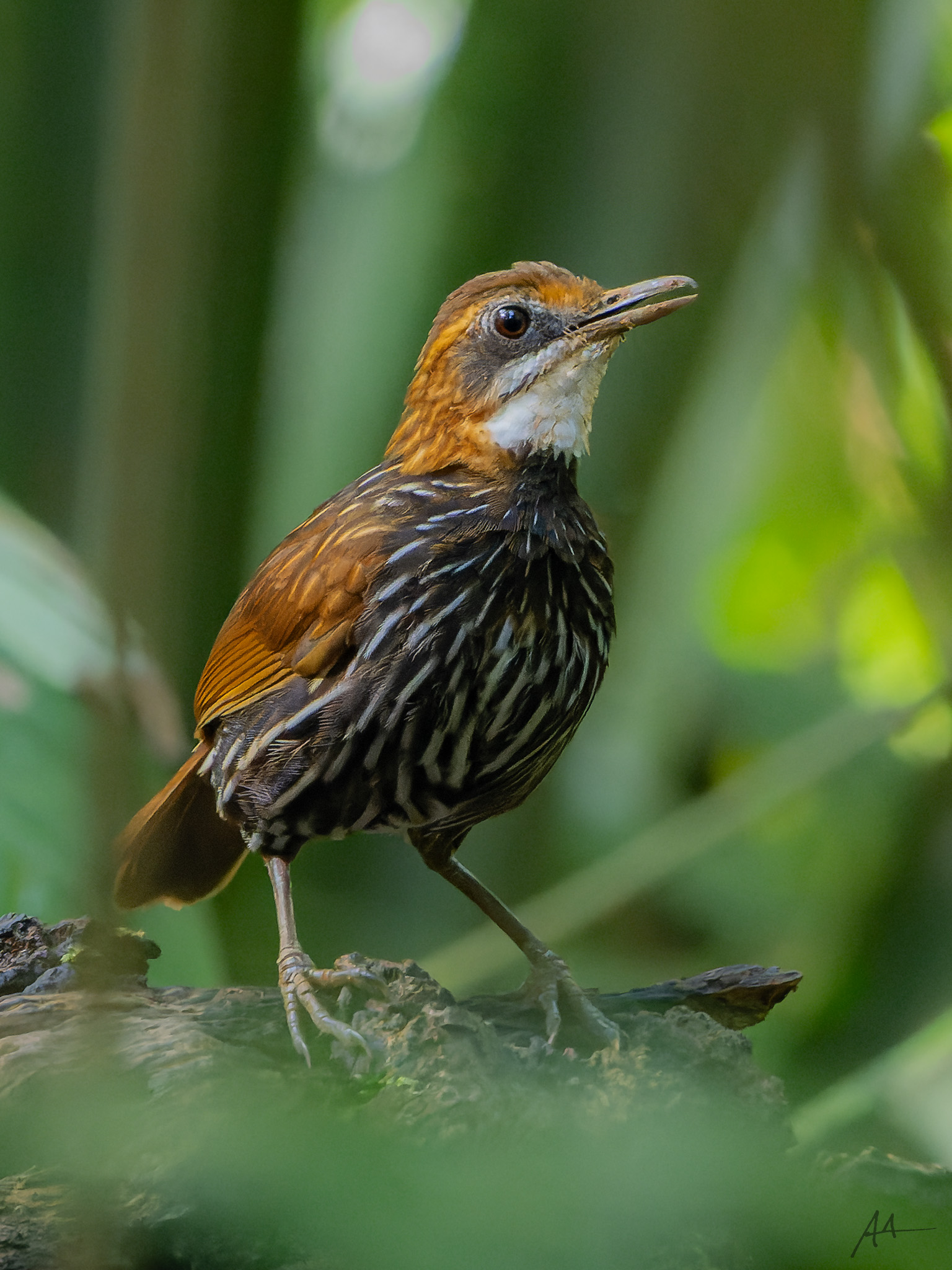

Conservation status
- Vulnerable (IUCN 3.1)

Scientific classification
- Kingdom: Animalia
- Phylum: Chordata
- Class: Aves
- Order: Passeriformes
- Family: Pellorneidae
- Genus: Ptilocichla
- Species: P. falcata

Binomial name
- Ptilocichla falcata Sharpe, 1877

= Falcated wren-babbler =

Species of bird

The falcated wren-babbler (Ptilocichla falcata) is a species of bird in the family Pellorneidae. It is endemic to Palawan. Its natural habitat is tropical moist lowland forest. It is threatened by habitat loss

Along with the Melodious babbler and Palawan flycatcher, they have been dubbed the Tres Amigos (Spanish) or Three Friends as some of the most sought after birds in Palawan.

== Description and taxonomy ==
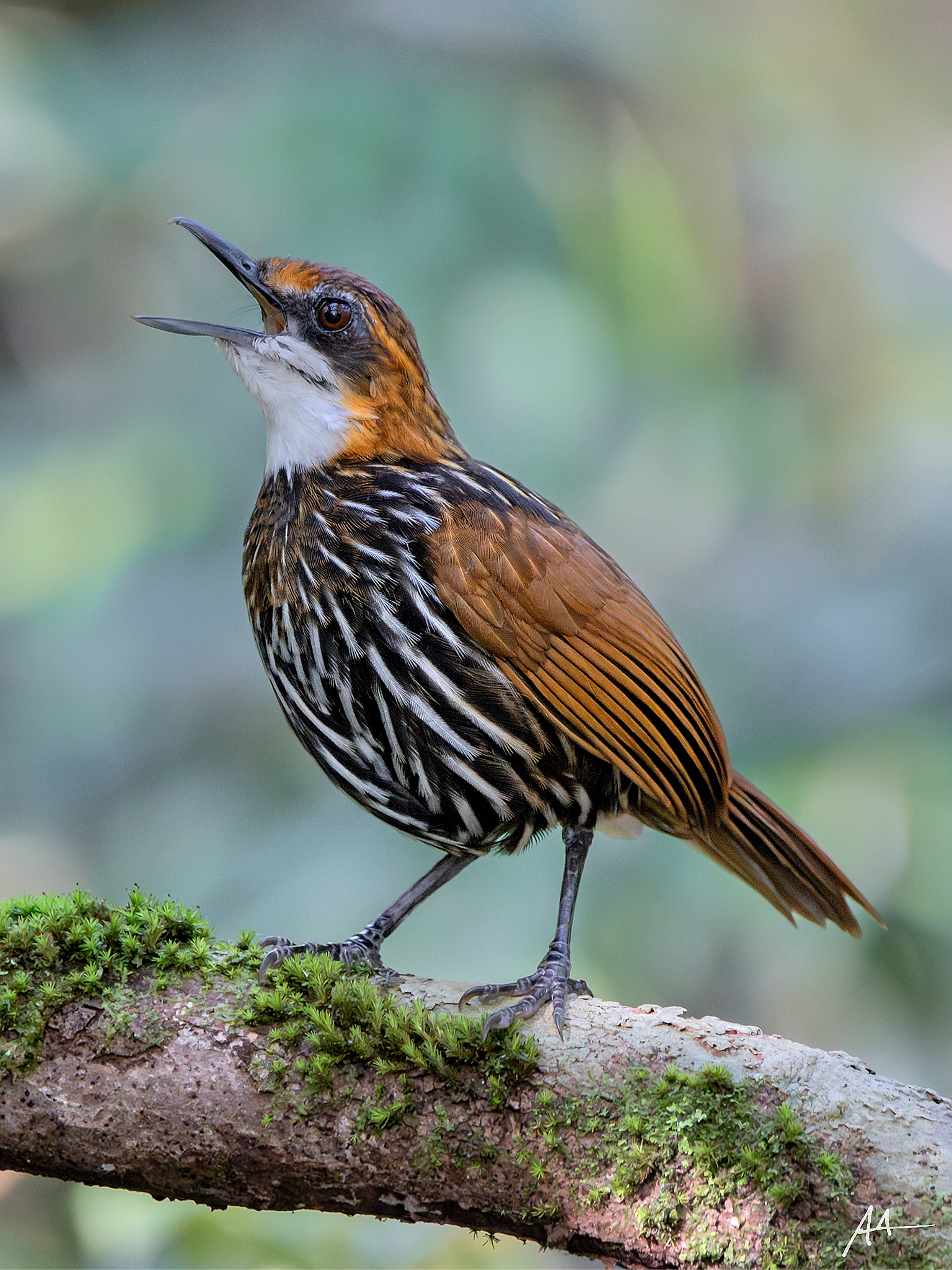
A singing Falcated-wren babbler

Descibed as a striking medium sized bird found in the lowland forests of Palawan. It has a blackish body with striking white streaks from which it is named after. It has orange-brown wings, tail and head with a white throat with a fine black moustache and mask. Bill is blackish and rather longwith a hooked tip.Relative to the other members of the wren-babbler family it has a long tail.

This species is monotypic and has no subspecies.

== Ecology and behavior ==
The stomach contents of a collected specimen contained scorpions, insects and berries. This species forages secretively on the ground around dense thickets and fallen trees.

Found to take superworms in bird feeding stations.

These birds are believed to be territorial and its loud song is part of its territorial display. Not much is known about its breeding habits.

== Habitat and conservation status ==
It inhabits tropical moist lowland primary forest up to 800 meters above sea level. It is often found near streams, ridges and bamboo forests. It is sensitive to habitat loss and cannot tolerate secondary forest.

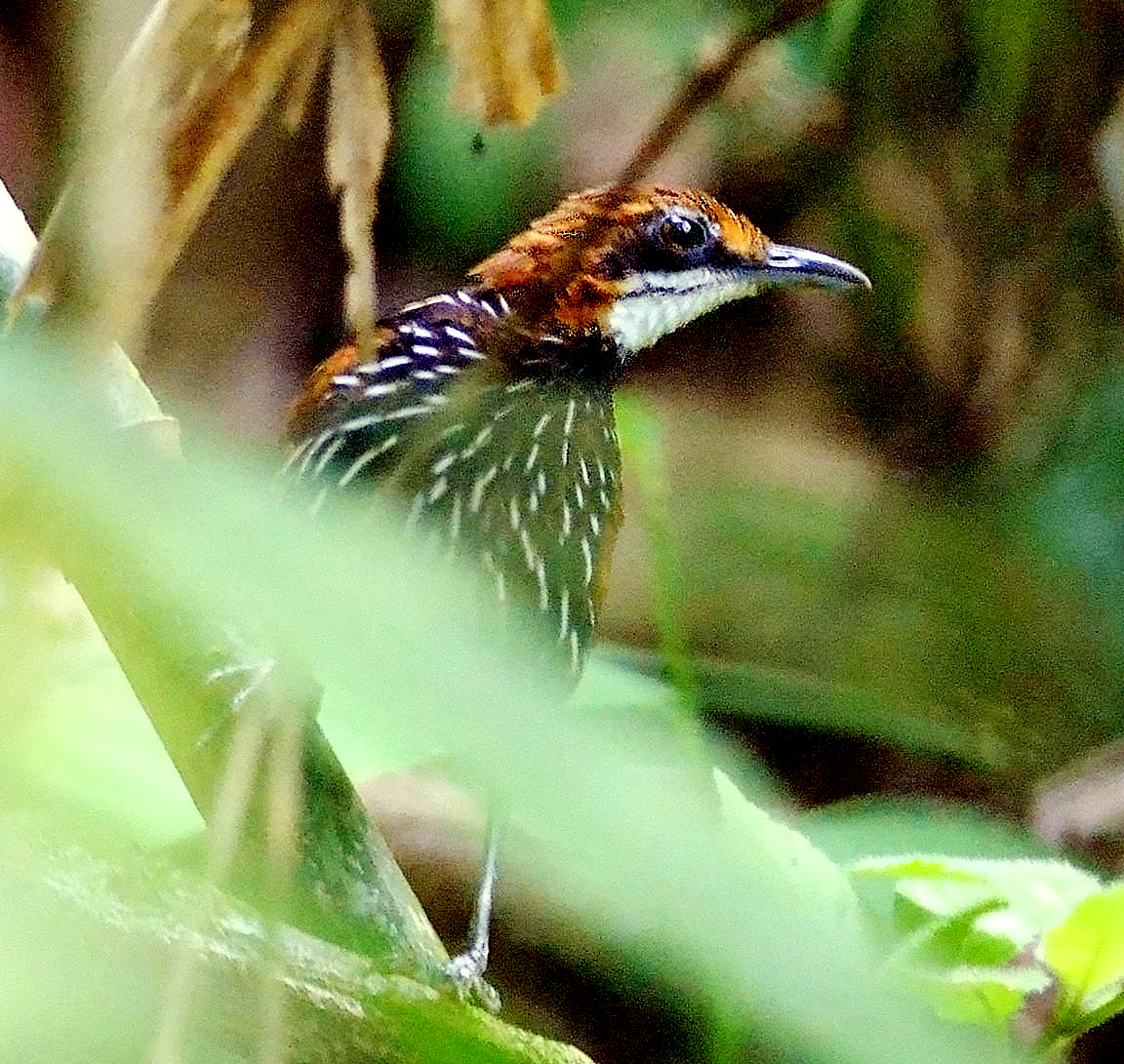
A Falcated wren-babbler seen through dense foliage.

IUCN has assessed this bird as vulnerable with its population being estimated at 10,000 to 19,999 mature individuals. Forest loss, due to legal and illegal logging, mining and conversion into farmland and urban development, is its main threat.

The whole of Palawan was designated as a Biosphere Reserve; however, protection and enforcement of laws has been difficult and these threats still continue. It occurs in just one protected area in Puerto Princesa Subterranean River National Park.

Conservation actions proposed include surveys of remaining lowland forest to understand its true distribution and population status and to propose key sites as protected areas; to assess its ecological requirements, particularly its sensitivity to habitat modification; to support the extension of Puerto Princesa Subterranean River National Park; and to formally protect the forests of Iwahig Prison and Penal Farm.
