= Wren-babbler =

Several bird genera in multiple families contain species commonly known as wren-babblers, including:

== Timaliidae ==
- Spelaeornis

== Pellorneidae ==
- Napothera
- Rimator
- Ptilocichla
- Kenopia

== Pnoepygidae ==
- Pnoepyga

== Elachuridae ==
- Elachura
