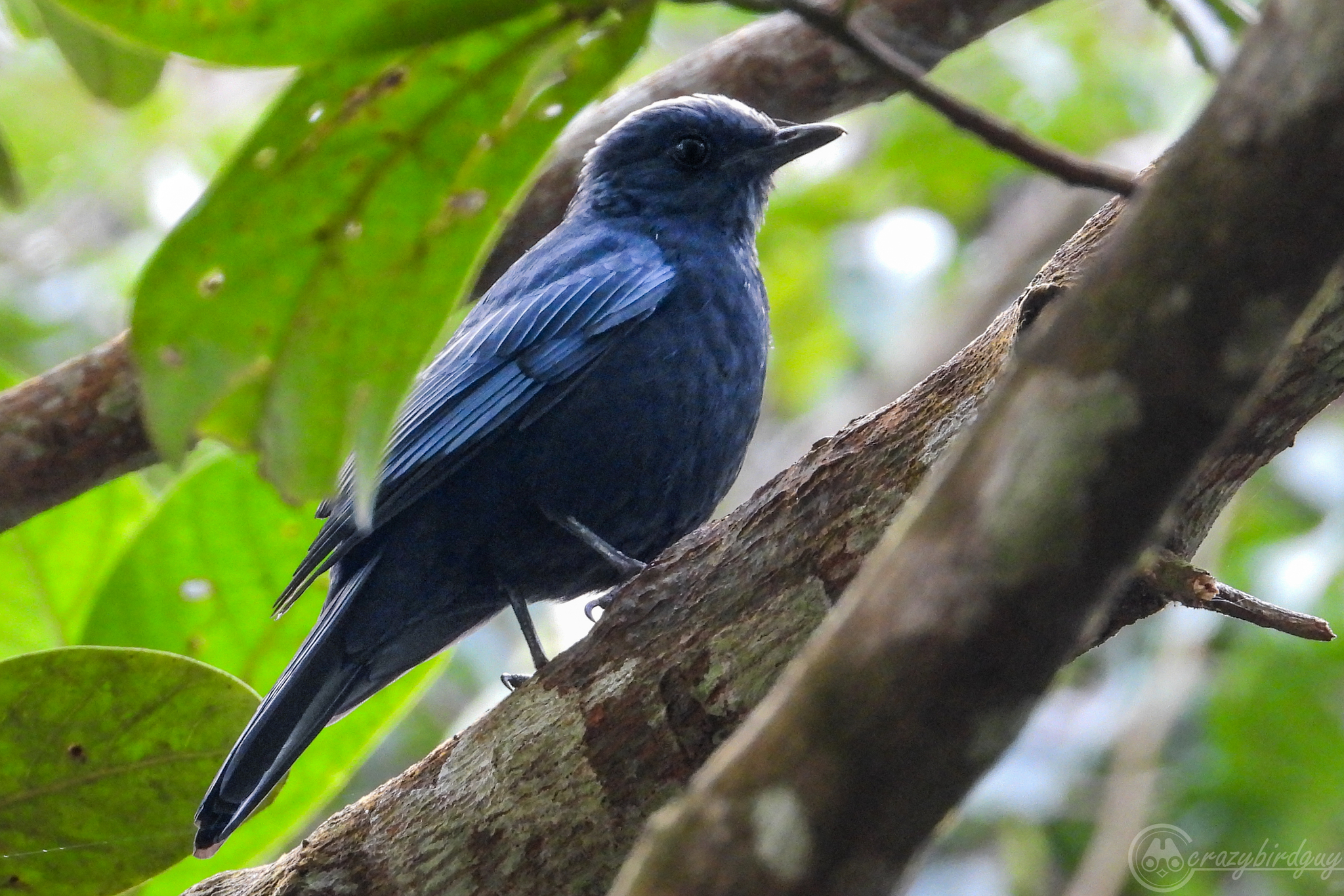

Conservation status
- Vulnerable (IUCN 3.1)

Scientific classification
- Kingdom: Animalia
- Phylum: Chordata
- Class: Aves
- Order: Passeriformes
- Family: Turdidae
- Genus: Cochoa
- Species: C. azurea

Binomial name
- Cochoa azurea (Temminck, 1824)

= Javan cochoa =

Species of bird

The Javan cochoa (Cochoa azurea) is a species of bird in the family Turdidae. It is endemic to Indonesia.

Its natural habitat is subtropical or tropical moist montane forests. It is threatened by habitat loss.
