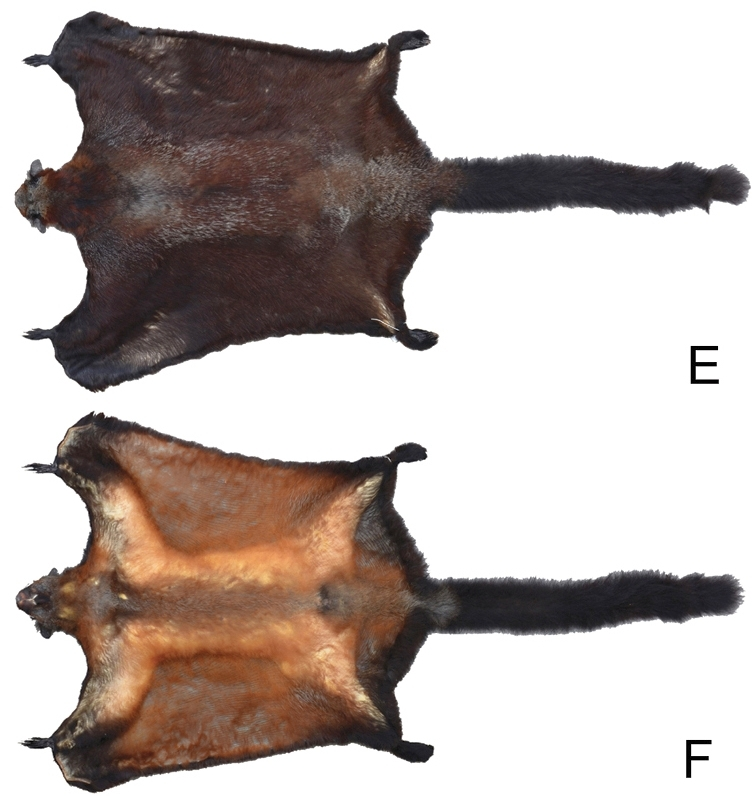
- NUoL FES.MM.12.163, holotype

Conservation status
- Data Deficient (IUCN 3.1)

Scientific classification
- Kingdom: Animalia
- Phylum: Chordata
- Class: Mammalia
- Order: Rodentia
- Family: Sciuridae
- Genus: Biswamoyopterus
- Species: B. laoensis

Binomial name
- Biswamoyopterus laoensis Sanamxay, Douangboubpha, Bumrungsri, Xayavong, Xayaphet, Satasook & Bates 2013
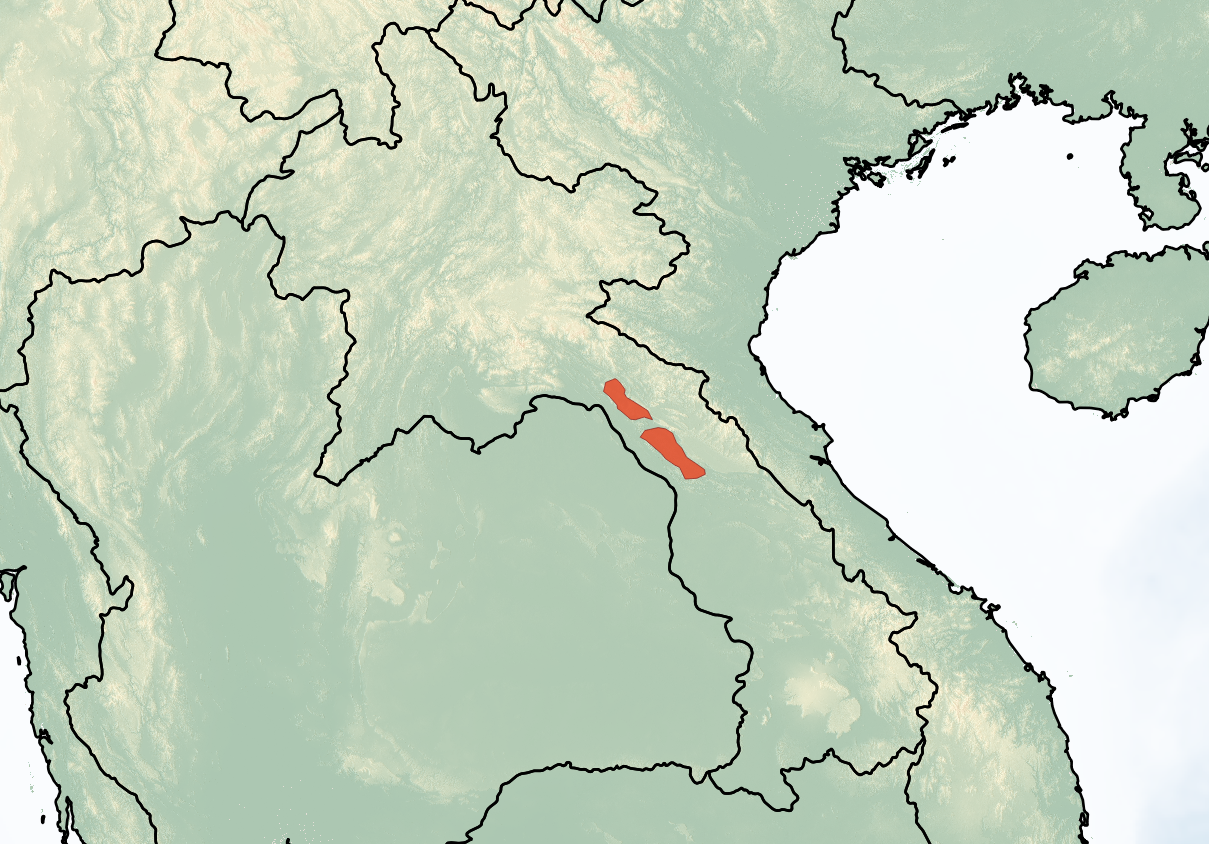

= Laotian giant flying squirrel =

Species of rodent

The Laotian giant flying squirrel (Biswamoyopterus laoensis) is an arboreal, flying squirrel endemic to Laos. It was the second described member in the genus Biswamoyopterus, after being first collected in September 2012 by scientists researching the animal corpses in the illegal Thongnami bushmeat market, Ban Thongnami, Pakkading District, Bolikhamxai Province.

== Description ==
Biswamoyopterus laoensis has reddish, grizzled fur with white above. Its crown is pale grey, its patagium is orangish and its underparts are white.

Biswamoyopterus laoensis has one of the greatest lengths in the squirrel family, with a body length of 0.46 m (18 in) and a tail length of 0.62 m (24 in), for a total length of 1.08 m (43 in), along with a mass of 1.8 kg (4.0 lb). This is slightly larger than the one other Biswamoyopterus species, B. biswasi, known from a single sample found in India in 1981.
