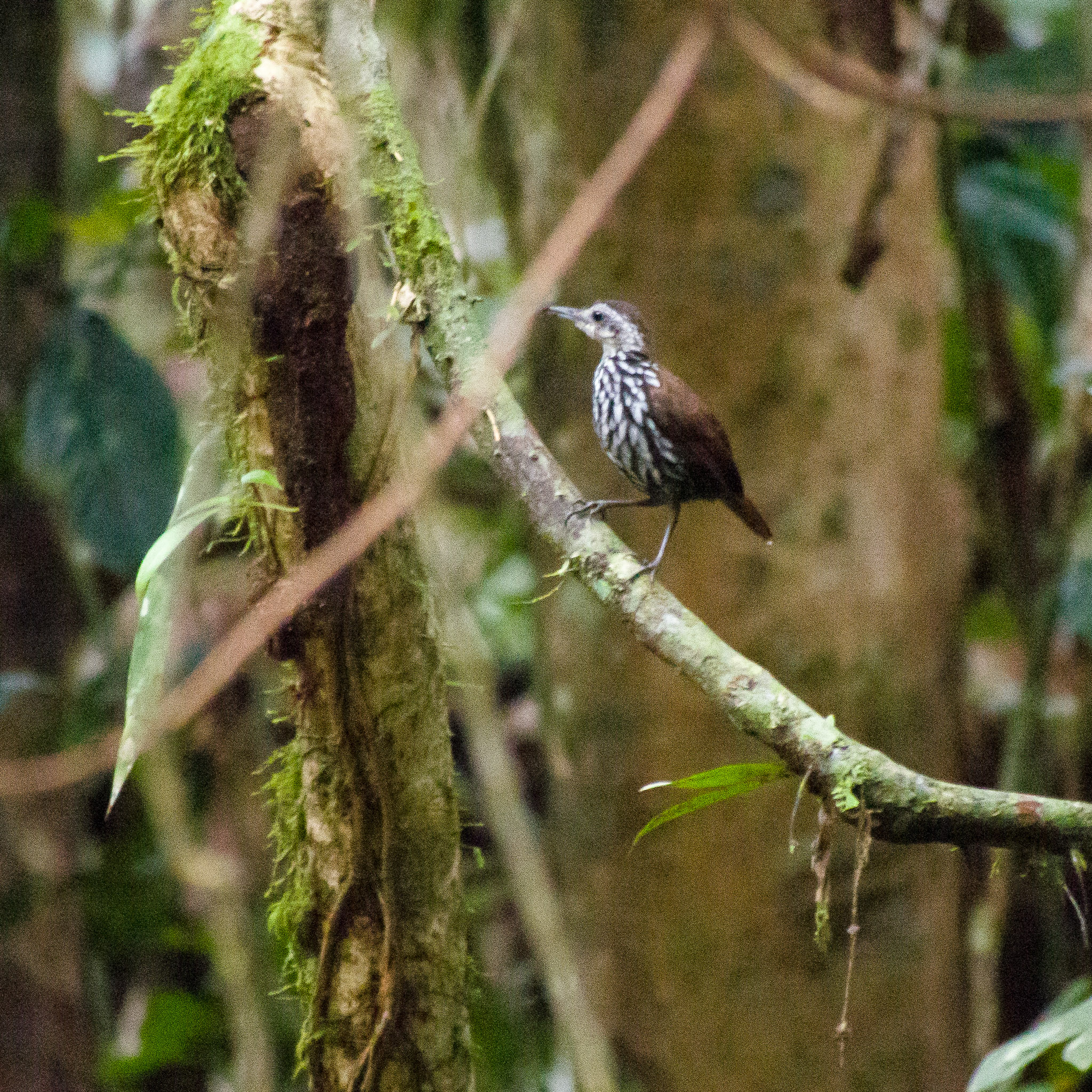

Conservation status
- Vulnerable (IUCN 3.1)

Scientific classification
- Kingdom: Animalia
- Phylum: Chordata
- Class: Aves
- Order: Passeriformes
- Family: Pellorneidae
- Genus: Ptilocichla
- Species: P. leucogrammica

Binomial name
- Ptilocichla leucogrammica (Bonaparte, 1850)

= Bornean wren-babbler =

Species of bird

The Bornean wren-babbler (Ptilocichla leucogrammica) is a species of bird in the family Pellorneidae. It is found in Brunei, Indonesia, and Malaysia, where it is endemic to the island of Borneo. Its natural habitats are subtropical or tropical moist lowland forest and subtropical or tropical swampland. It is threatened by habitat loss.
