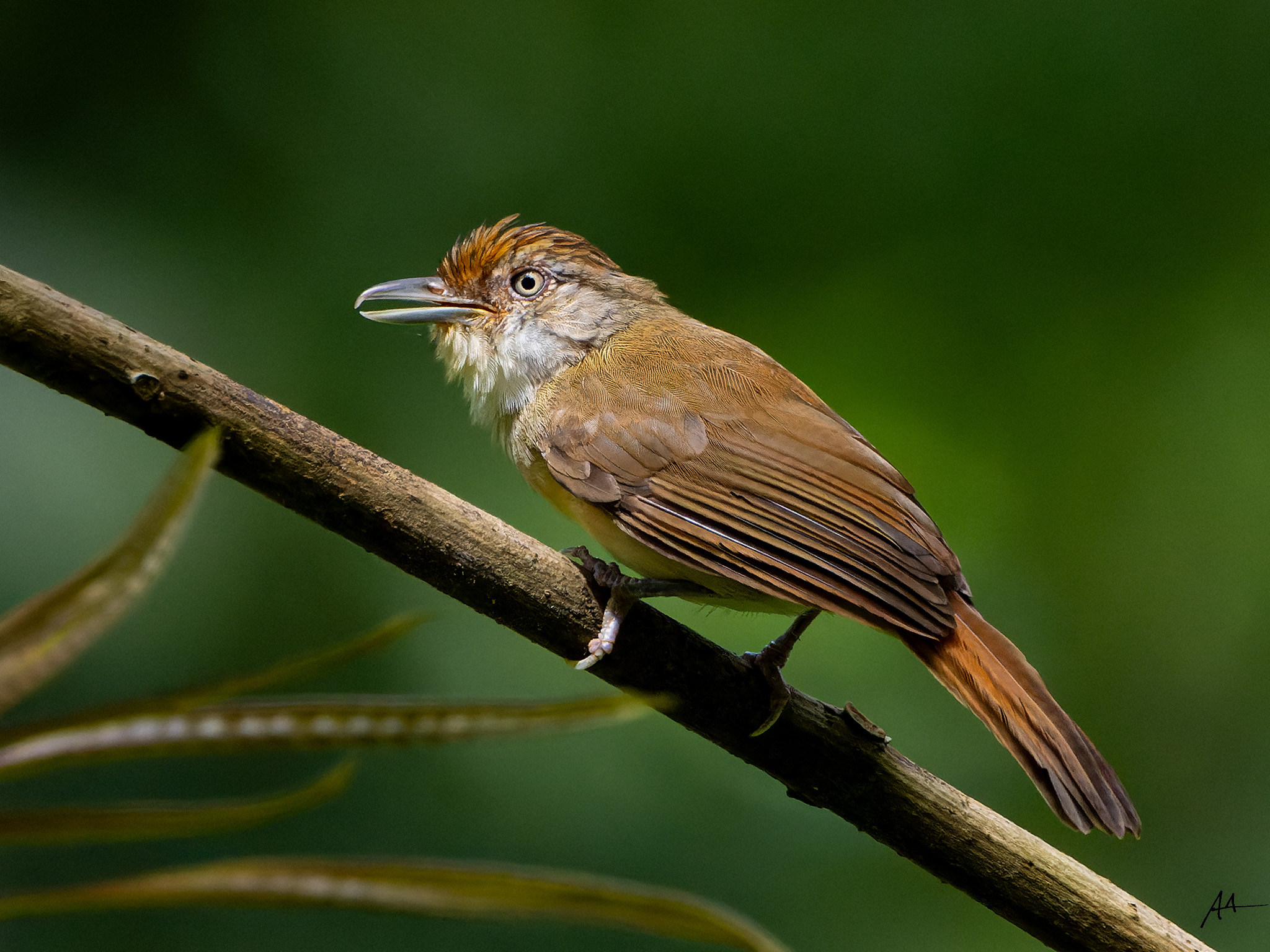

Conservation status
- Vulnerable (IUCN 3.1)

Scientific classification
- Kingdom: Animalia
- Phylum: Chordata
- Class: Aves
- Order: Passeriformes
- Family: Pellorneidae
- Genus: Malacopteron
- Species: M. palawanense

Binomial name
- Malacopteron palawanense Büttikofer, 1895

= Melodious babbler =

Species of bird

The Melodious babbler or Palawan babbler (Malacopteron palawanense) is a species of bird in the family Pellorneidae. It is endemic to the Philippines and found only on Palawan and Balabac.

Its natural habitat is tropical moist lowland forest. It is threatened by habitat loss due to deforestation, illegal logging and due to typhoons. Along with the Palawan flycatcher and Falcated wren-babbler, they have been dubbed the Tres Amigos (Spanish) or Three Friends as some of the most sought after birds in Palawan. It is known for its musical call hence the name.

== Description and taxonomy ==
Described as a medium sized bird of the lowland forests of Palawan and Balabac. Primarily light brown with more hints of reddish brown on the tail, shoulder and top of the head. Has a while belly and a pufffy white throat. Iris is grayish white. Bill is straight with a hooked tip. This species does not exhibit any obvious sexual dimorphism.

Song is a series of mournful whistles alternate between high and low notes that progressively increase in volume and then accompanied by a swift and harsh "whip".

This species is monotypic.

== Ecology and behavior ==
Diet is largely unknown but presumed to feed on insects and some vegetable matter. It is often seen foraging alone or in small groups foraging in the understorey in tangles and vines. It appears to be loyal to its territory and pairs are often observed in the same general area.

Birds in breeding but otherwise nothing is known about its breeding behaviour and the nest remains undescribed.

== Habitat and conservation status ==
The species inhabits tropical moist lowland primary forest and mature secondary forest only up to 100 meters above sea level.

This species has been assessed a Vulnerable species in 2025 as there is believed to be a significant decline of this species due to the damage from Typhoon Odette. This species is especially reliant on thick underbrush and the degradation of this areas, even temporarily due to typhoons can significantly cause population declines and low surviviability. Population is now estimated at just 4,500 to 13,500 mature individuals with a declining population. Populations believed to be decreasing due to habitat loss, deforestation and mining. The whole of Palawan was designated as a Biosphere Reserve; however, protection and enforcement of laws has been difficult and these threats still continue. It occurs in just one protected area in the Iwahig Prison and Penal Farm.
