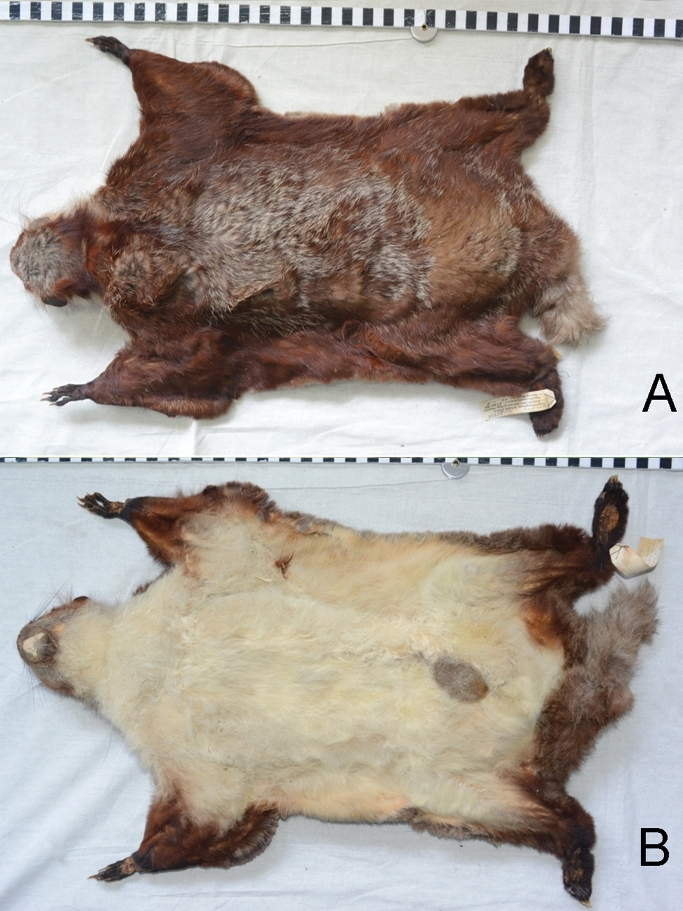
- Specimen of Biswamoyopterus biswasi, viewed from above and below

Scientific classification
- Kingdom: Animalia
- Phylum: Chordata
- Class: Mammalia
- Order: Rodentia
- Family: Sciuridae
- Tribe: Pteromyini
- Genus: Biswamoyopterus; Saha, 1981

Type species
- Biswamoyopterus biswasi Saha, 1981

Species
- Biswamoyopterus biswasi; Biswamoyopterus laoensis; Biswamoyopterus gaoligongensis
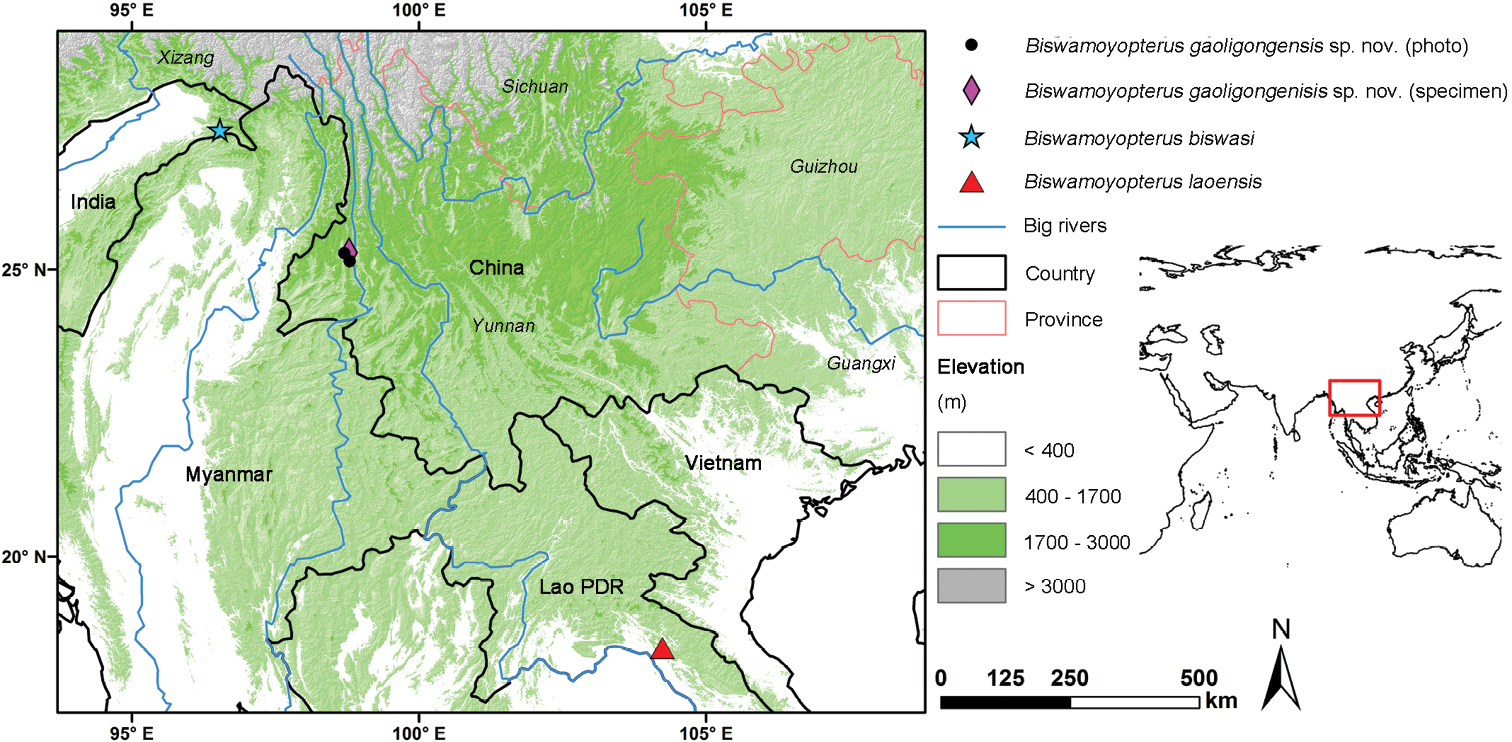
- Range of Biswamoyopterus species

= Biswamoyopterus =

Genus of rodents

Biswamoyopterus is a genus of rodent in the family Sciuridae. It contains three known species of very large flying squirrels, with B. laoensis being among the longest of all squirrels. They are distributed in forests in northeast India, southwest China and Laos. Despite their size, species in this genus tend to be very elusive; due to this, all of them have been described relatively recently. In fact 2 out of the 3 species are only known from a single specimen. Additionally, they are easily confused with certain Petaurista giant flying squirrels that are more common and overlap in range with the rare Biswamoyopterus.

== Species ==
There are currently three known species in this genus:

- Namdapha flying squirrel Biswamoyopterus biswasi
- Mount Gaoligong flying squirrel Biswamoyopterus gaoligongensis
- Laotian giant flying squirrel Biswamoyopterus laoensis

Recent studies have suggested that the three known species are in fact one species. It was based on the Morphological comparisons, where the three species shared nearly similar morphologies.
