= Palawan flycatcher =

Conservation status
- Vulnerable (IUCN 3.1)

Scientific classification
- Kingdom: Animalia
- Phylum: Chordata
- Class: Aves
- Order: Passeriformes
- Family: Muscicapidae
- Genus: Ficedula
- Species: F. platenae

Binomial name
- Ficedula platenae (Blasius, 1888)

Species of bird

The Palawan flycatcher (Ficedula platenae) is a species of bird in the family Muscicapidae. It is endemic to the Philippines found only in the region of Palawan. Its natural habitat is tropical moist lowland forests. It is threatened by habitat loss.

Along with the Melodious babbler and Falcated wren-babbler, they have been dubbed the Tres Amigos (Spanish) or Three Friends as some of the most sought after birds in Palawan.

== Description and taxonomy ==
This is a small bird of lowland forest in Palawan. Primarily pale orange in plummage with a white belly and a bright orange tail.

The female has deeper orange brown lores but the difference is slight and difficult to spot.

The Palawan flycatcher has a very unusual and distinct call. Song is a soft whistled "puu-puu piii!" with the third note higher. Also gives a repeated upslurred "puuii".This call gets repeated anywhere from 10 to 15 times in quick repetition. Then it gets followed by a short 5-10 second trill. The bird also will fan out and shake its tail while doing this call. This call very insect-like call often gets mistaken as an insect's call.

This species is monotypic

== Ecology and behavior ==

Typically solitary and forages secretively on the close to the forest floor and in tangled vines, rattan and climbing bamboo where it feeds on insects.

Breeding season occurs during May to September but otherwise nothing is known about its breeding behaviour and the nest remains undescribed.

== Habitat and conservation status ==
It inhabits primary and secondary dipterocarp forest up to 1,000 meters above sea level. It favours areas rich in rattan, bamboo and palm trees. While they can somewhat tolerate secondary forest, they appear to be sensitive to habitat modification It is often found on the lower understory and close to the forest floor. They have been noted to be very faithful to their favoured sites.

It has been assessed as vulnerable with a population currently between 6,000 and 15,000, the Palawan flycatcher has attracted help from conservation groups. These groups have created protected areas on these islands where logging can't occur. By doing this, the primary source of their decline is lessened. Conservation groups attempted to cultivate and restore the lands which their species was wiped from. Unlike most species, the Palawan flycatcher did not return to these lands after the restoration back to old growth.

The species is present in conservation areas - the entirety of Palawan has been designated a biosphere reserve but actual protection and enforcement against logging and hunting has been difficult. They are present in the protected area of the Puerto Princesa Subterranean River National Park.

Conservation actions proposed include surveys in remaining lowland forests in order to better understand population and distribution, habitat and tolerance for degradation. Support the proposed extension of Puerto Princesa Subterranean River National Park and formally protect other key sites in Iwahig Prison and Penal Farm and Mt. Victoria.
