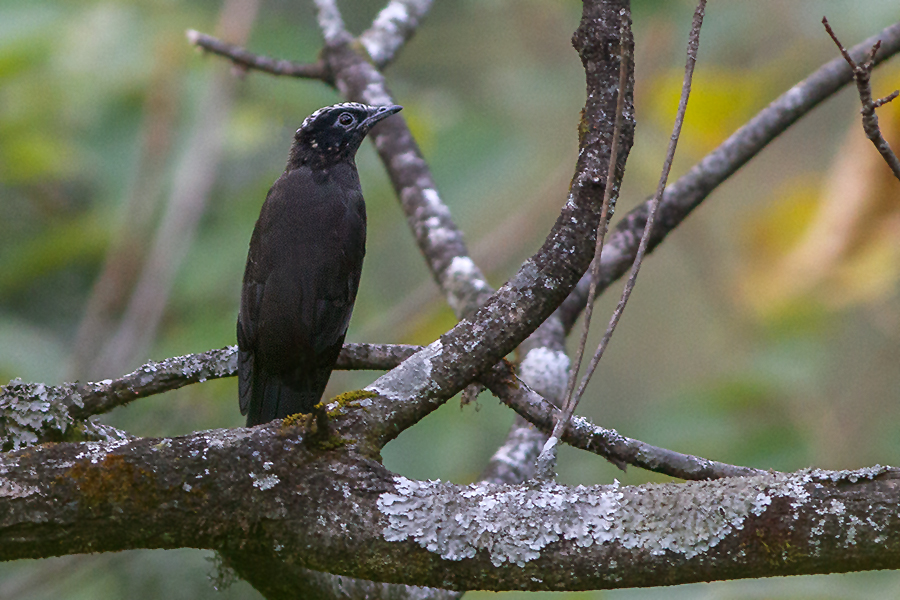
- Male from West Sikkim

Conservation status
- Least Concern (IUCN 3.1)

Scientific classification
- Kingdom: Animalia
- Phylum: Chordata
- Class: Aves
- Order: Passeriformes
- Family: Turdidae
- Genus: Cochoa
- Species: C. purpurea

Binomial name
- Cochoa purpurea Hodgson, 1836

= Purple cochoa =

Species of bird

The purple cochoa (Cochoa purpurea) is a brightly coloured bird found in the temperate forests of Asia. It is a quiet and elusive bird species that has been considered to be related to the thrushes of family Turdidae or the related Muscicapidae (Old World flycatchers). They are found in dark forested areas and is found in the canopy, where it often sits motionless.

== Description ==
This bird appears dark in the shade of the forest and the colours become clear only when it is lit by the sun. The crown is silvery blue and a black mask runs over the eye. A grey carpal patch is present at the base of the black wing feathers and a wing patch is prominent. The tail is silvery blue with a black terminal band. The male has dull purplish grey secondaries and coverts and the body is greyish while the female has rufous replacing the purple.

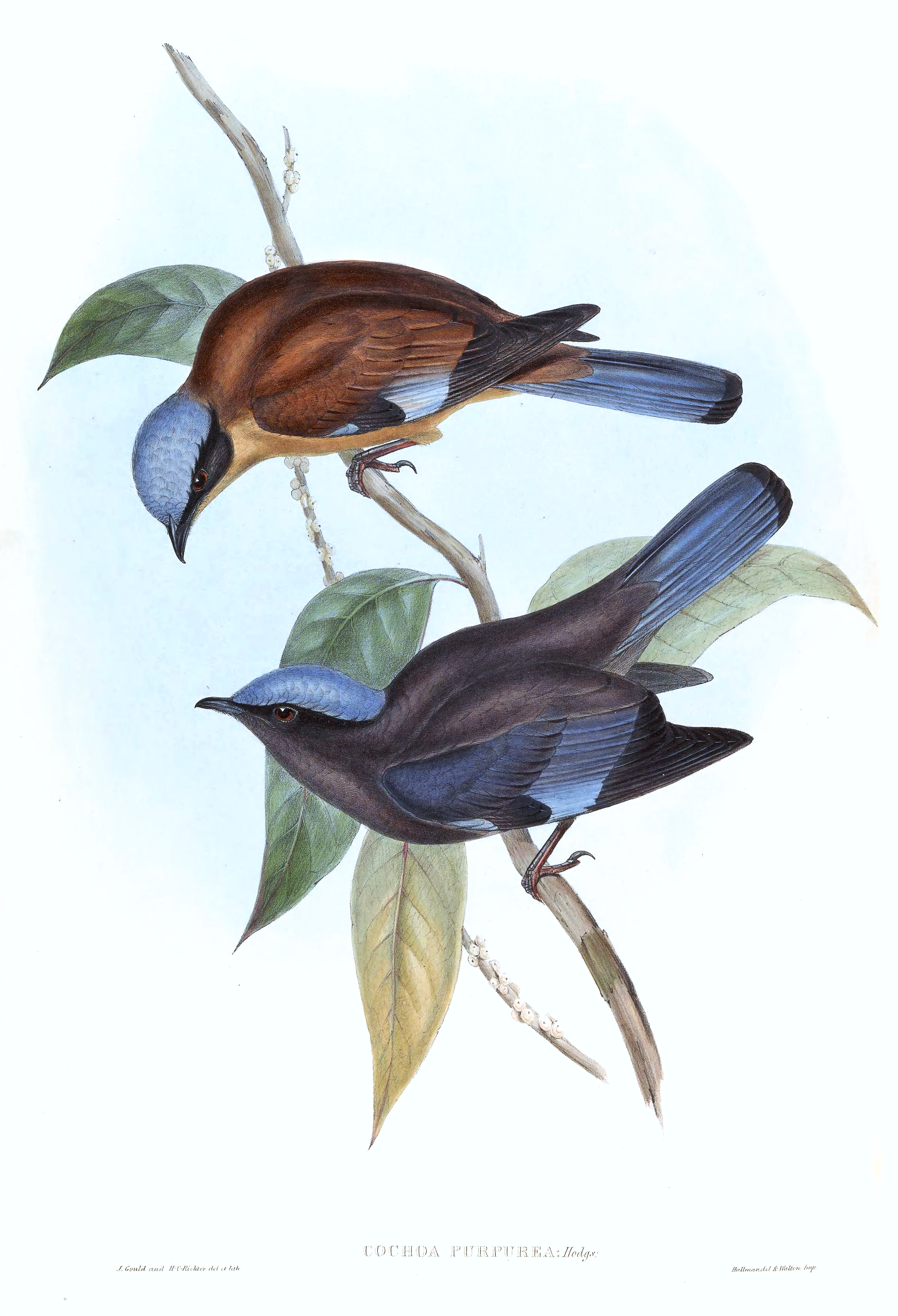
An artist's illustration of both male and female.

The genus name is from the Nepali word for the bird and was used by Brian Houghton Hodgson. The family position of the cochoas has been unclear with some sources suggesting that they belong to the Muscicapidae while others have suggested them to be in the family Turdidae. The latter suggestion has found more support in recent molecular studies.

== Distribution and habitat ==
It is found in Bangladesh, Bhutan, China, India, Laos, Myanmar, Nepal, Thailand, and Vietnam. In India, it is found along the Himalayas with the western limit about 100 km west of Musoorie.

Its natural habitats include humid forests as well as undergrowth areas along ravines

== Behaviour and ecology ==
The species is not very active and is found mainly in the canopy. The breeding season is May to July, when it builds a cup shaped nest in a fork. The nest is covered with moss, lichens and a white thread-like fungus which is said to be distinctive. Three pale sea-green eggs with some blotchy markings are laid and both sexes take turns in incubation. The birds are shy at the nest and slip away even when disturbances are afar. The song consists of is a low whistle while other calls include a sit and soft trrrs. Charles Inglis reported that the birds have an iora-like whistling call in the mornings and evenings. These cochoas feed on berries, insects and molluscs. While picking fruits from trees they were observed behaving like flycatchers doing short sallies.
