= Mount Gaoligong flying squirrel =

Scientific classification
- Kingdom: Animalia
- Phylum: Chordata
- Class: Mammalia
- Order: Rodentia
- Family: Sciuridae
- Genus: Biswamoyopterus
- Species: B. gaoligongensis

Binomial name
- Biswamoyopterus gaoligongensis Li et al., 2019

Species of rodent

The Mount Gaoligong flying squirrel (Biswamoyopterus gaoligongensis) is a species of large, arboreal flying squirrel endemic to highland forests in southwestern China.

It is the third known member of the highly elusive genus Biswamoyopterus. It was described from two specimens discovered in 2017 and 2018, in the vicinity of Mount Gaoligong in the western Yunnan Province. These specimens were distinct from the other two species in the genus in both coloration and skull shape, indicating that they belonged to a distinct species. This species has also been photographed at two different localities at the eastern and western slopes of Mount Gaoligong. A single specimen of the Mount Gaoligong flying squirrel had a head-and-body length of 44 cm (1 ft 5 in), a tail length of 52 cm (1 ft 8 in) and a weight of 1.370 kg (3.02 lb). Despite being distantly related, the Mount Gaoligong flying squirrel is easily confused with the more common Yunnan giant flying squirrel; they occur together at Mount Gaoligong. Its natural habitat is evergreen broadleaf forest at an altitude of about 2,000 m (6,600 ft) above sea level. Due to its restricted distribution and general rarity, it is threatened by human activities such as agriculture and poaching.
