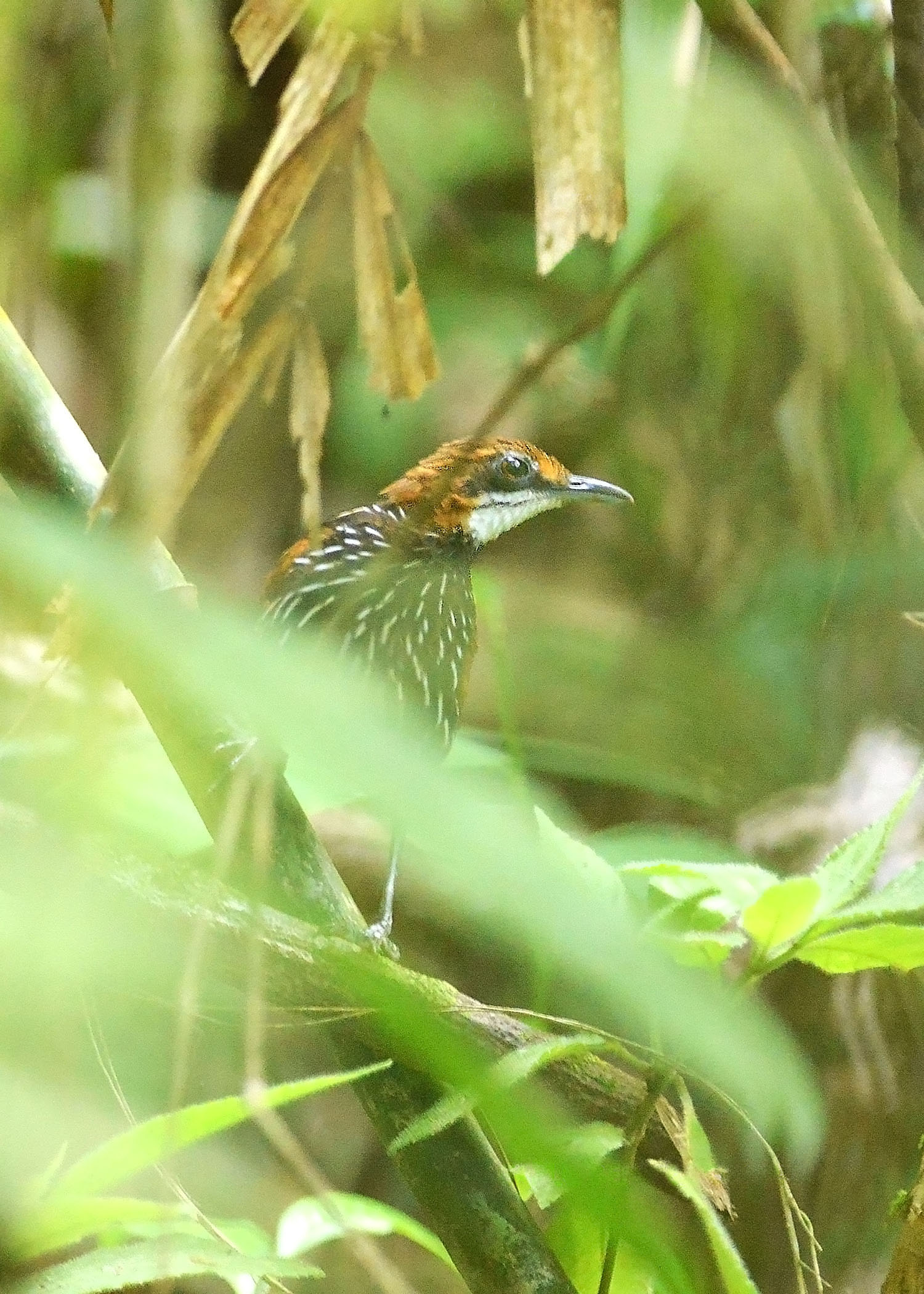
- Falcated wren-babbler (Ptilocichla falcata)

Scientific classification
- Kingdom: Animalia
- Phylum: Chordata
- Class: Aves
- Order: Passeriformes
- Family: Pellorneidae
- Genus: Ptilocichla; Sharpe, 1877

Type species
- Ptilocichla falcata Sharpe, 1877

= Ptilocichla =

Genus of birds

Ptilocichla is a genus of passerine birds in the family Pellorneidae.

== Species ==
The genus contains the following species:

Image	Common name	Scientific name	Distribution
	Falcated wren-babbler	Ptilocichla falcata	Palawan.
	Bornean wren-babbler	Ptilocichla leucogrammica	Brunei, Indonesia, and Malaysia,
	Striated wren-babbler	Ptilocichla mindanensis	Philippines.

== Bibliography ==
- Collar, N. J. & Robson, C. 2007. Family Timaliidae (Babblers) pp. 70 – 291 in; del Hoyo, J., Elliott, A. & Christie, D.A. eds. Handbook of the Birds of the World, Vol. 12. Picathartes to Tits and Chickadees. Lynx Edicions, Barcelona.
