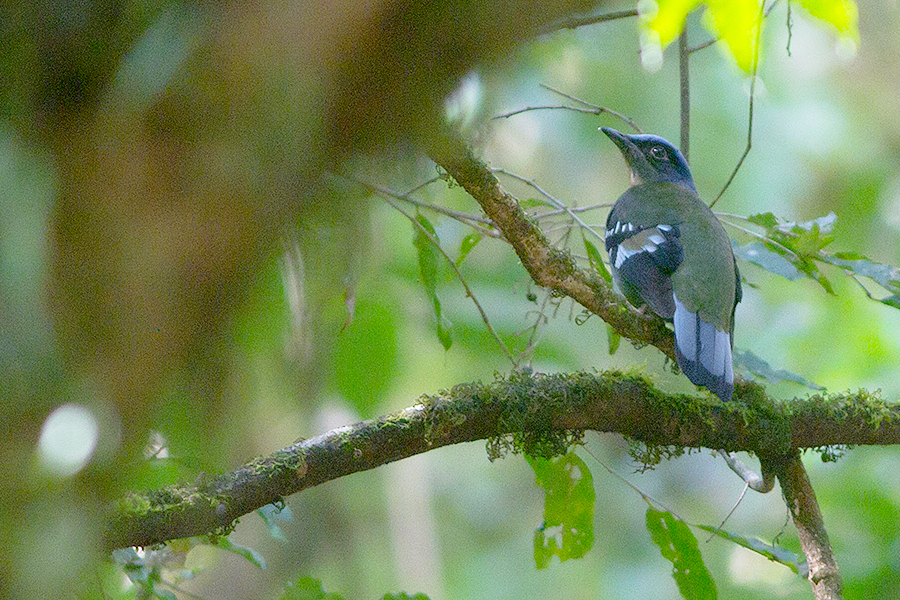
- Female of the species from Khonoma Nature Conservation and Tragopan Sanctuary, Nagaland, India
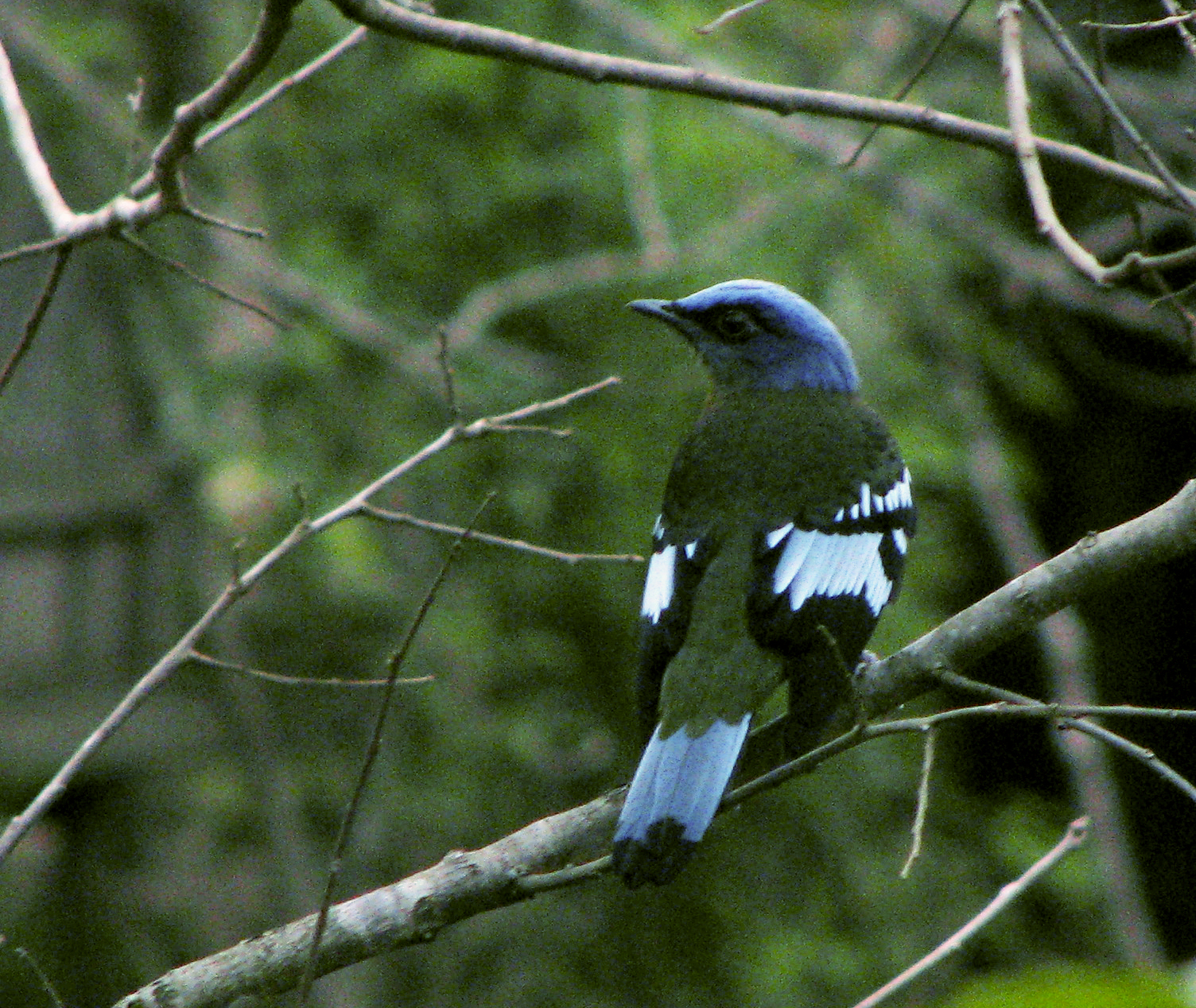
- A male

Conservation status
- Least Concern (IUCN 3.1)

Scientific classification
- Kingdom: Animalia
- Phylum: Chordata
- Class: Aves
- Order: Passeriformes
- Family: Turdidae
- Genus: Cochoa
- Species: C. viridis

Binomial name
- Cochoa viridis Hodgson, 1836

= Green cochoa =

Species of bird

The green cochoa (Cochoa viridis) is a bird species that was variously placed with the thrushes of family Turdidae or the related Muscicapidae (Old World flycatchers). It is considered closer to the former.

== Description ==
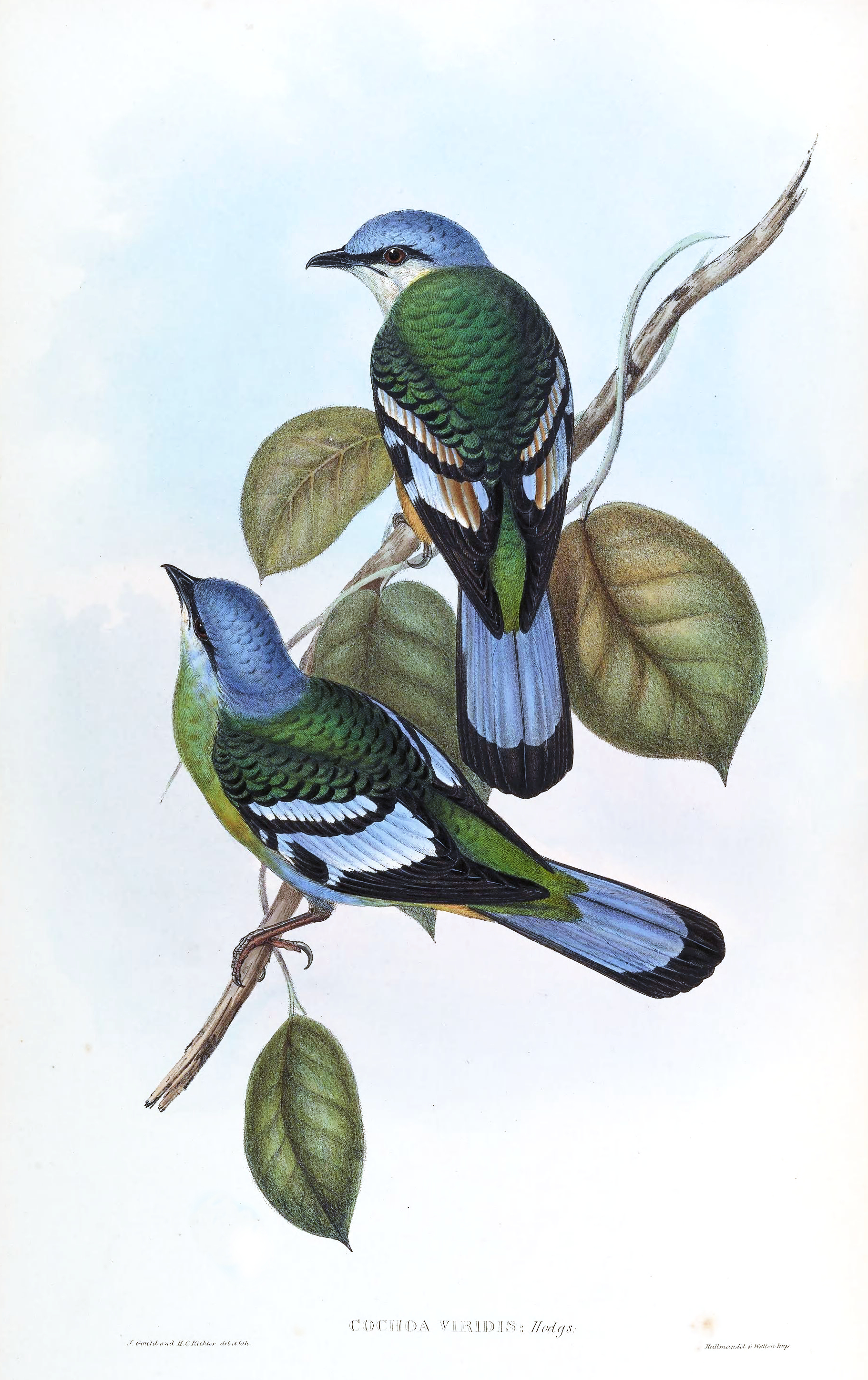
Lithograph by Gould, female above

This Himalayan thrush is moss green. The male has a blue crown, blue wings and tail with a broad black band on the tail. The female has a more greenish body with some rusty spots on the wing coverts. The secondaries and tertiaries have the base of the outer webs yellowish brown with very narrow blue edging, unlike in the male. In some plumages there is a white collar on the sides of the neck. This form was once described as a new species Cochoa rothschildi. First year birds have dark shaft streaks on the body feathers.

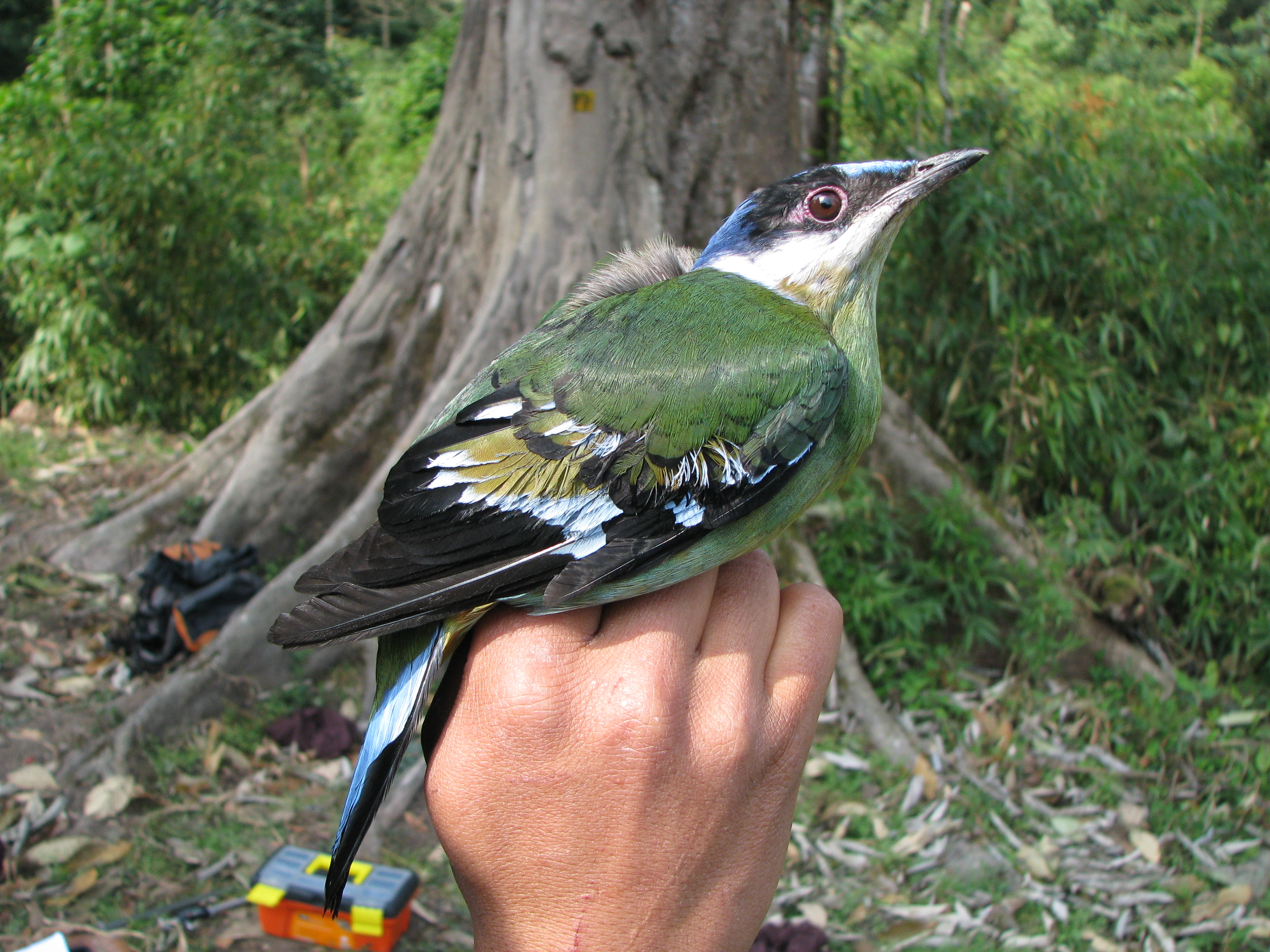
A female green cochoa; note the characteristic rufous tinge on the wing panels

== Distribution and habitat ==
The green cochoa is found in Cambodia, China, India, Laos, Myanmar, Nepal, Thailand, Vietnam, and possibly Bhutan. Its natural habitats are subtropical or tropical moist lowland forests and subtropical or tropical moist montane forests. They make seasonal movements that are not well understood. Their distribution in winter in India is unclear as the species is found only in summer. An old record from Uttaranchal (Nainital) is the westernmost record, and no recent records exist from Nepal. Most records are east of northwest Bengal.

== Behaviour and ecology ==
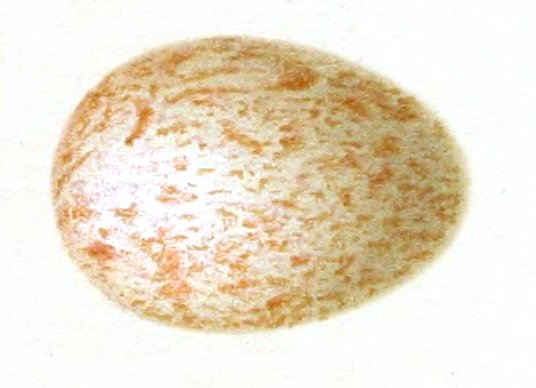
Egg

The green cochoa is usually seen in pairs or small groups sitting in tall trees. They usually feed close to the ground, on mollusks, insects and berries. They sometimes launch aerial sallies to capture insects. This species breeds in summer, and the nest is much like that of the purple cochoa, but is usually placed close to water. Both parents take turns incubating. The song is a thin and clear feeeee that dies away. Calls include a short high-pitched pok and harsh notes.

The glossy eggs are ellipsoidal and densely speckled.
