= List of sciurids =

Species in mammal family Sciuridae

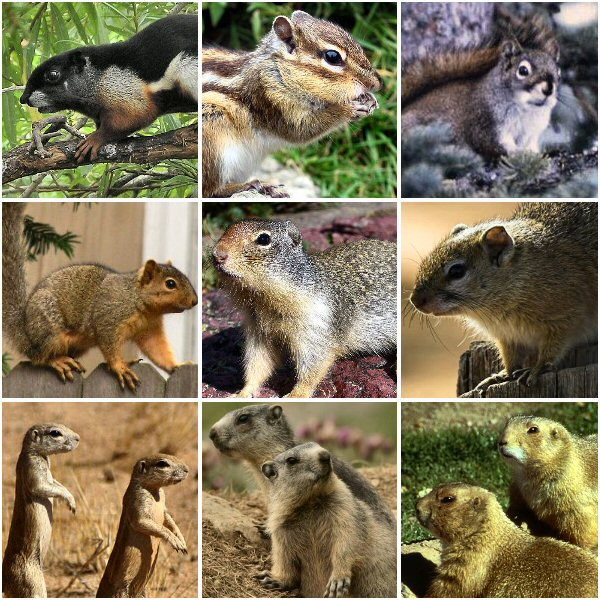
Clockwise from upper right, then center: American red squirrel (Tamiasciurus hudsonicus), Smith's bush squirrel (Paraxerus cepapi), black-tailed prairie dog (Cynomys ludovicianus), marmot (Marmota), Cape ground squirrel (Geosciurus inauris), fox squirrel (Sciurus niger), Prevost's squirrel (Callosciurus prevostii), Siberian chipmunk (Eutamias sibiricus), Columbian ground squirrel (Urocitellus columbianus)

Sciuridae is a family of small mammals in the order Rodentia and part of the Sciuromorpha suborder. Members of this family are called sciurids, and include squirrels, chipmunks, and marmots. They are found worldwide outside of Australia and Antarctica, primarily in forests, shrublands, and grasslands, though some species can be found in wetlands, deserts, or rocky areas. They range in size from the lesser pygmy flying squirrel, at 6 cm (2 in) plus a 6 cm (2 in) tail, to the Olympic marmot, at 75 cm (30 in) plus a 24 cm (9 in) tail. Sciurids primarily feed on fruit, seeds, and nuts, though many species also eat insects, fungi, bark, eggs, and small vertebrates. Almost no sciurids have population estimates, though fifteen species are categorized as endangered species and three—the Namdapha flying squirrel, Vancouver Island marmot, and speckled ground squirrel—are categorized as critically endangered.

The 284 extant species of Sciuridae are divided into five subfamilies: Callosciurinae, containing 67 species of Asian squirrels in 14 genera; Ratufinae, containing four species of giant squirrels in a single genus; Sciurillinae, containing only the neotropical pygmy squirrel; Sciurinae, containing 84 species of flying squirrel and tree squirrels in 20 genera; and Xerinae, containing 128 species of marmots, chipmunks, prairie dogs, and ground squirrels in 24 genera. A few extinct prehistoric sciurid species have been discovered, though due to ongoing research and discoveries, the exact number and categorization is not fixed.

== Conventions ==
IUCN Red List categories
Conservation status
- EX: Extinct (0 species)
- EW: Extinct in the wild (0 species)
- CR: Critically endangered (3 species)
- EN: Endangered (15 species)
- VU: Vulnerable (14 species)
- NT: Near threatened (25 species)
- LC: Least concern (197 species)

Other categories
- DD: Data deficient (30 species)
- NE: Not evaluated (0 species)

The author citation for the species or genus is given after the scientific name; parentheses around the author citation indicate that this was not the original taxonomic placement. Conservation status codes listed follow the International Union for Conservation of Nature (IUCN) Red List of Threatened Species. Range maps are provided wherever possible; if a range map is not available, a description of the sciurid's range is provided. Ranges are based on the IUCN Red List for that species unless otherwise noted.

== Classification ==
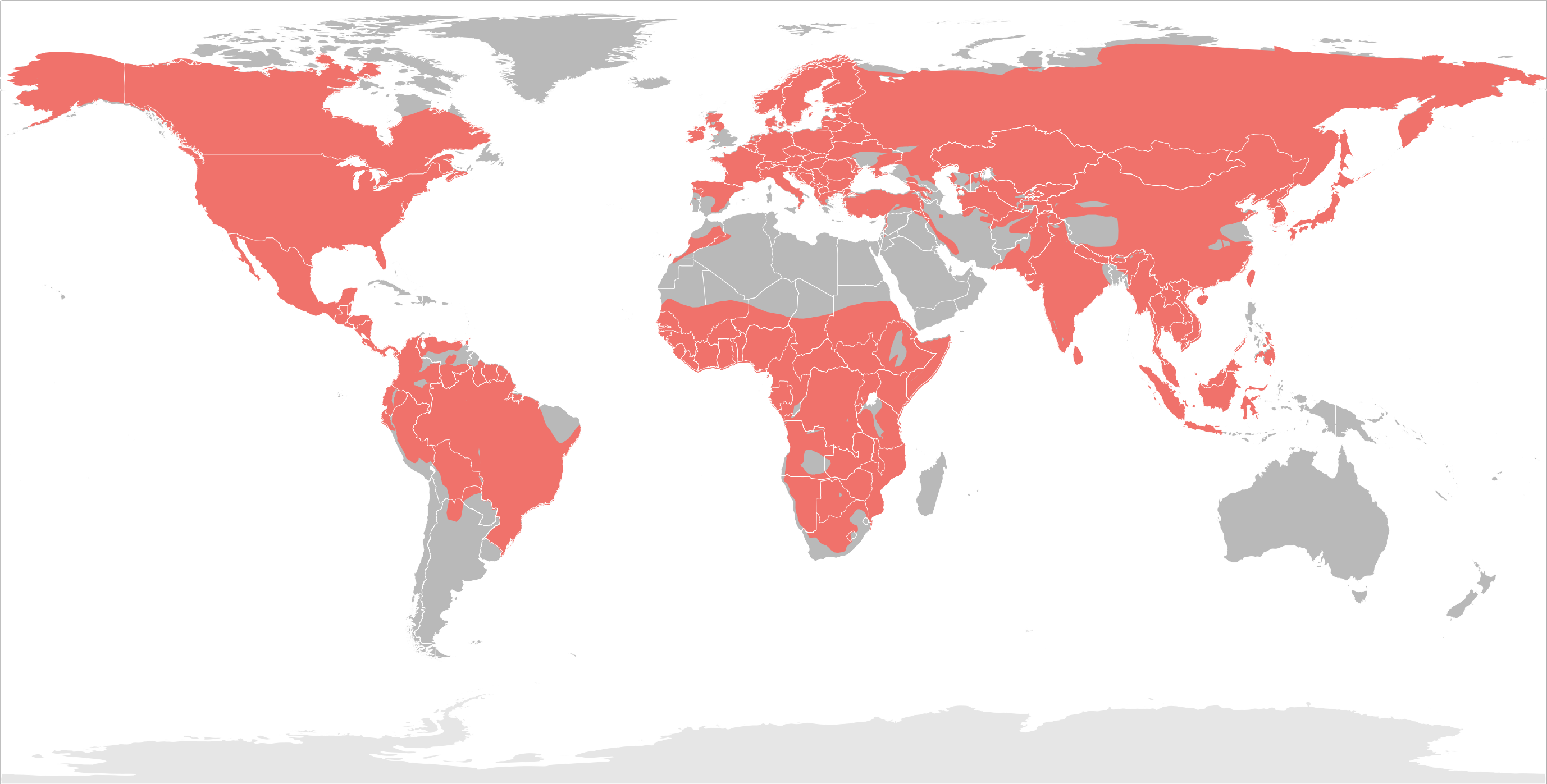
Sciuridae distribution

Sciuridae is a family consisting of 284 extant species in 60 genera. These genera are divided between five subfamilies: Callosciurinae, Ratufinae, Sciurillinae, Sciurinae, and Xerinae. Callosciurinae contains 67 species in 14 genera, Ratufinae contains four species in a single genus, Sciurillinae contains a single species, Sciurinae contains 84 species in 20 genera, and Xerinae contains 128 species in 24 genera.

Family Sciuridae

- Subfamily Callosciurinae
  - Genus Callosciurus (beautiful squirrels): fifteen species
  - Genus Dremomys (red-cheeked squirrels): six species
  - Genus Exilisciurus (pygmy squirrels): three species
  - Genus Funambulus (palm squirrels): six species
  - Genus Glyphotes (sculptor squirrel): one species
  - Genus Hyosciurus (long-nosed squirrels): two species
  - Genus Lariscus (black-striped squirrels): four species
  - Genus Menetes (Berdmore's ground squirrel): one species
  - Genus Nannosciurus (black-eared squirrel): one species
  - Genus Prosciurillus (Sulawesi tree squirrels): seven species
  - Genus Rhinosciurus (shrew-faced squirrel): one species
  - Genus Rubrisciurus (red-bellied squirrel): one species
  - Genus Sundasciurus (Sunda squirrels): fifteen species
  - Genus Tamiops (Asiatic striped squirrels): four species
- Subfamily Ratufinae
  - Genus Ratufa (giant squirrels): four species
- Subfamily Sciurillinae
  - Genus Sciurillus (neotropical pygmy squirrel): one species
- Subfamily Sciurinae
  - Genus Aeretes (groove-toothed flying squirrel): one species
  - Genus Aeromys (large black flying squirrels): two species
  - Genus Belomys (hairy-footed flying squirrel): one species
  - Genus Biswamoyopterus (Indochinese giant flying squirrels): two species
  - Genus Eoglaucomys (Kashmir flying squirrel): one species
  - Genus Eupetaurus (western woolly flying squirrel): one species
  - Genus Glaucomys (New World flying squirrels): two species
  - Genus Hylopetes (arrow-tailed flying squirrels): nine species
  - Genus Iomys (Horsfield's flying squirrels): two species
  - Genus Microsciurus (dwarf squirrels): four species
  - Genus Petaurillus (pygmy flying squirrels): three species
  - Genus Petaurista (giant flying squirrels): ten species
  - Genus Petinomys (dwarf flying squirrels): eight species
  - Genus Pteromys (Old World flying squirrels): two species
  - Genus Pteromyscus (smoky flying squirrel): one species
  - Genus Rheithrosciurus (tufted ground squirrel): one species
  - Genus Sciurus (tree squirrels): twenty-nine species
  - Genus Syntheosciurus (Bangs's mountain squirrel): one species
  - Genus Tamiasciurus (American pine squirrels): three species
  - Genus Trogopterus (complex-toothed flying squirrel): one species
- Subfamily Xerinae
  - Genus Ammospermophilus (antelope squirrels): four species
  - Genus Atlantoxerus (Barbary ground squirrel): one species
  - Genus Callospermophilus (golden-mantled ground squirrels): three species
  - Genus Cynomys (prairie dogs): five species
  - Genus Epixerus (Ebian's palm squirrel): one species
  - Genus Eutamias (Siberian chipmunk): one species
  - Genus Funisciurus (rope squirrels): ten species
  - Genus Heliosciurus (sun squirrels): six species
  - Genus Ictidomys (lined ground squirrels): two species
  - Genus Marmota (marmots): fourteen species
  - Genus Myosciurus (African pygmy squirrel): one species
  - Genus Neotamias (chipmunks): twenty-three species
  - Genus Notocitellus (tropical ground squirrels): two species
  - Genus Otospermophilus (American rock squirrels): two species
  - Genus Paraxerus (African bush squirrels): eleven species
  - Genus Poliocitellus (Franklin's ground squirrel): one species
  - Genus Protoxerus (African giant squirrels): two species
  - Genus Sciurotamias (Chinese rock squirrels): two species
  - Genus Spermophilopsis (long-clawed ground squirrel): one species
  - Genus Spermophilus (Holarctic ground squirrels): fifteen species
  - Genus Tamias (eastern chipmunk): one species
  - Genus Urocitellus (ground squirrels): twelve species
  - Genus Xerospermophilus (desert ground squirrels): four species
  - Genus Xerus (unstriped ground squirrels): four species

== Sciurids ==
The following classification is based on the taxonomy described by the reference work Mammal Species of the World (2005), with augmentation by generally accepted proposals made since using molecular phylogenetic analysis, as supported by both the IUCN and the American Society of Mammalogists.

=== Subfamily Callosciurinae ===
Genus Callosciurus – Gray, 1867 – fifteen species
Common name	Scientific name and subspecies	Range	Size and ecology	IUCN status and estimated population
Anderson's squirrel	C. quinquestriatus (Anderson, 1871) Two subspecies: C. q. imarius; C. q. quinquestriatus	Southern China and Myanmar	Size: About 20 cm (8 in) long, plus 18–21 cm (7–8 in) tail Habitat: Forest Diet: Fruit, nuts, seeds, flowers, vegetation, insects, and eggs	LC Unknown
Black-striped squirrel	C. nigrovittatus (Horsfield, 1823) Four subspecies: C. n. bilimitatus; C. n. bocki; C. n. klossi; C. n. nigrovittatus	Southeastern Asia	Size: 18–20 cm (7–8 in) long, plus 15–19 cm (6–7 in) tail Habitat: Forest and shrubland Diet: Fruit, nuts, seeds, flowers, vegetation, insects, and eggs	LC Unknown
Borneo black-banded squirrel	C. orestes (Thomas, 1895)	Northern Borneo	Size: 14–16 cm (6 in) long, plus 13–16 cm (5–6 in) tail Habitat: Forest Diet: Fruit, nuts, seeds, flowers, vegetation, insects, and eggs	LC Unknown
Ear-spot squirrel	C. adamsi (Kloss, 1921)	Borneo	Size: 15–17 cm (6–7 in) long, plus 14–16 cm (6 in) tail Habitat: Forest Diet: Fruit, nuts, seeds, flowers, vegetation, insects, and eggs	NT Unknown
Finlayson's squirrel	C. finlaysonii (Horsfield, 1823) Sixteen subspecies: C. f. albivexilli; C. f. annellatus; C. f. bocourti; C. f. boonsongi; C. f. cinnamomeus; C. f. ferrugineus; C. f. finlaysonii; C. f. folletti; C. f. frandseni; C. f. germaini; C. f. harmandi; C. f. menamicus; C. f. nox; C. f. sinistralis; C. f. trotteri; C. f. williamsoni	Southeastern Asia	Size: 19–21 cm (7–8 in) long, plus 17–22 cm (7–9 in) tail Habitat: Forest, shrubland, and inland wetlands Diet: Fruit, nuts, seeds, flowers, vegetation, insects, and eggs	LC Unknown
Grey-bellied squirrel	C. caniceps (Gray, 1842) Six subspecies: C. c. adangensis; C. c. bimaculatus; C. c. caniceps; C. c. casensis; C. c. concolor; C. c. domelicus	Southeastern Asia	Size: 21–22 cm (8–9 in) long, plus 22–24 cm (9 in) tail Habitat: Forest and shrubland Diet: Fruit, nuts, seeds, flowers, vegetation, insects, and eggs	LC Unknown
Inornate squirrel	C. inornatus (Gray, 1867)	Southeastern Asia	Size: About 29 cm (11 in) long, plus 17–21 cm (7–8 in) tail Habitat: Forest and shrubland Diet: Fruit, nuts, seeds, flowers, vegetation, insects, and eggs	LC Unknown
Irrawaddy squirrel	C. pygerythrus (Geoffroy, 1831) Seven subspecies: C. p. blythii; C. p. janetta; C. p. lokroides; C. p. mearsi; C. p. owensi; C. p. pygerythrus; C. p. stevensi	Southern Asia	Size: 18–23 cm (7–9 in) long, plus 11–22 cm (4–9 in) tail Habitat: Shrubland and forest Diet: Fruit, nuts, seeds, flowers, vegetation, insects, and eggs	LC Unknown
Kinabalu squirrel	C. baluensis (Bonhote, 1901)	Malaysia	Size: 23–24 cm (9 in) long, plus 24–25 cm (9–10 in) tail Habitat: Forest Diet: Fruit, nuts, seeds, flowers, vegetation, insects, and eggs	LC Unknown
Kloss's squirrel	C. albescens (Bonhote, 1901)	Indonesia	Size: 20–24 cm (8–9 in) long, plus 17–19 cm (7 in) tail Habitat: Forest and shrubland Diet: Fruit, nuts, seeds, flowers, vegetation, insects, and eggs	DD Unknown
Mentawai squirrel	C. melanogaster (Thomas, 1895) Three subspecies: C. m. atratus; C. m. melanogaster; C. m. mentawi	Indonesia	Size: About 21 cm (8 in) long, plus about 18 cm (7 in) tail Habitat: Forest Diet: Fruit, nuts, seeds, flowers, vegetation, insects, and eggs	VU Unknown
Pallas's squirrel	C. erythraeus (Pallas, 1779) 26 subspecies: C. e. atrodorsalis; C. e. bartoni; C. e. bhutanensis; C. e. bonhotei; C. e. castaneoventris; C. e. erythraeus; C. e. erythrogaster; C. e. flavimanus; C. e. gloveri; C. e. gordoni; C. e. griseimanus; C. e. harringtoni; C. e. hendeei; C. e. hyperythrus; C. e. intermedius; C. e. michianus; C. e. ningpoensis; C. e. pranis; C. e. rubeculus; C. e. shanicus; C. e. siamensis; C. e. sladeni; C. e. styani; C. e. thai; C. e. thaiwanensis; C. e. zimmeensis	Southeastern and eastern Asia	Size: 21–23 cm (8–9 in) long, plus 17–27 cm (7–11 in) tail Habitat: Forest and shrubland Diet: Fruit, nuts, seeds, flowers, vegetation, insects, and eggs	LC Unknown
Phayre's squirrel	C. phayrei (Blyth, 1856)	Southern China and Myanmar	Size: 21–24 cm (8–9 in) long, plus 20–25 cm (8–10 in) tail Habitat: Forest Diet: Fruit, nuts, seeds, flowers, vegetation, insects, and eggs	LC Unknown
Plantain squirrel	C. notatus (Boddaert, 1785) Five subspecies: C. n. diardii; C. n. miniatus; C. n. notatus; C. n. suffusus; C. n. vittatus	Southeastern Asia	Size: 20–24 cm (8–9 in) long, plus 17–19 cm (7 in) tail Habitat: Forest, shrubland, and inland wetlands Diet: Fruit, nuts, seeds, flowers, vegetation, insects, and eggs	LC Unknown
Prevost's squirrel	C. prevostii (Desmarest, 1822) Six subspecies: C. p. atricapillus; C. p. melanops; C. p. piceus; C. p. prevostii; C. p. rafflesii; C. p. sarawakensis	Southeastern Asia	Size: About 24 cm (9 in) long, plus about 23 cm (9 in) tail Habitat: Forest Diet: Fruit, nuts, seeds, flowers, vegetation, insects, and eggs	LC Unknown

Genus Dremomys – Heude, 1898 – six species
Common name	Scientific name and subspecies	Range	Size and ecology	IUCN status and estimated population
Asian red-cheeked squirrel	D. rufigenis (Blanford, 1878) Five subspecies: D. r. adamsoni; D. r. belfieldi; D. r. fuscus; D. r. ornatus; D. r. rufigenis	Southeastern and eastern Asia	Size: 18–20 cm (7–8 in) long, plus 14–17 cm (6–7 in) tail Habitat: Forest and shrubland Diet: Fruit, nuts, vegetation, and insects	LC Unknown
Bornean mountain ground squirrel	D. everetti (Thomas, 1890)	Borneo	Size: 15–18 cm (6–7 in) long, plus 9–12 cm (4–5 in) tail Habitat: Forest Diet: Fruit, nuts, vegetation, and insects	LC Unknown
Orange-bellied Himalayan squirrel	D. lokriah (Hodgson, 1836) Five subspecies: D. l. garonum; D. l. lokriah; D. l. macmillani; D. l. motuoensis; D. l. pagus	Southern Asia	Size: 16–20 cm (6–8 in) long, plus 13–22 cm (5–9 in) tail Habitat: Forest Diet: Fruit, nuts, vegetation, and insects	LC Unknown
Perny's long-nosed squirrel	D. pernyi (H. Milne-Edwards, 1867) Six subspecies: D. p. flavior; D. p. howelli; D. p. imus; D. p. owstoni; D. p. pernyi; D. p. senex	Eastern Asia	Size: 17–20 cm (7–8 in) long, plus 13–18 cm (5–7 in) tail Habitat: Forest Diet: Fruit, nuts, vegetation, and insects	LC Unknown
Red-hipped squirrel	D. pyrrhomerus (Thomas, 1895) Two subspecies: D. p. pyrrhomerus; D. p. riudonensis	China and Vietnam	Size: 19–21 cm (7–8 in) long, plus 14–17 cm (6–7 in) tail Habitat: Rocky areas Diet: Fruit, nuts, vegetation, and insects	LC Unknown
Red-throated squirrel	D. gularis Osgood, 1932	China and Vietnam	Size: About 22 cm (9 in) long, plus about 17 cm (7 in) tail Habitat: Forest Diet: Fruit, nuts, vegetation, and insects	LC Unknown

Genus Exilisciurus – Moore, 1958 – three species
Common name	Scientific name and subspecies	Range	Size and ecology	IUCN status and estimated population
Least pygmy squirrel	E. exilis (Müller, 1838)	Southeastern Asia	Size: 7–8 cm (3 in) long, plus 4–6 cm (2 in) tail Habitat: Forest Diet: Vegetation and insects	DD Unknown
Philippine pygmy squirrel	E. concinnus (Thomas, 1888)	Philippines	Size: About 9 cm (4 in) long, plus 6–7 cm (2–3 in) tail Habitat: Forest Diet: Vegetation and insects	LC Unknown
Tufted pygmy squirrel	E. whiteheadi (Thomas, 1887)	Borneo	Size: 8–9 cm (3–4 in) long, plus 6–7 cm (2–3 in) tail Habitat: Forest Diet: Vegetation and insects	LC Unknown

Genus Funambulus – Lesson, 1835 – six species
Common name	Scientific name and subspecies	Range	Size and ecology	IUCN status and estimated population
Dusky striped squirrel	F. obscurus (Pelzeln & Kohl, 1886)	Sri Lanka	Size: 10–14 cm (4–6 in) long, plus 7–13 cm (3–5 in) tail Habitat: Forest Diet: Seeds, nuts, bark, buds, leaves, flowers, and insects	VU Unknown
Indian palm squirrel	F. palmarum (Linnaeus, 1766) Three subspecies: F. p. brodiei; F. p. palmarum; F. p. robertsoni	India and Sri Lanka	Size: 14–15 cm (6 in) long, plus 14–16 cm (6 in) tail Habitat: Forest, shrubland, grassland, and inland wetlands Diet: Seeds, nuts, bark, buds, leaves, flowers, and insects	LC Unknown
Jungle palm squirrel	F. tristriatus (Waterhouse, 1837) Two subspecies: F. t. numarius; F. t. tristriatus	India	Size: 15–16 cm (6 in) long, plus 13–15 cm (5–6 in) tail Habitat: Forest Diet: Seeds, nuts, bark, buds, leaves, flowers, and insects	LC Unknown
Layard's palm squirrel	F. layardi (Blyth, 1849) Two subspecies: F. l. dravidianus; F. l. layardi	Sri Lanka	Size: 14–16 cm (6 in) long, plus 15–17 cm (6–7 in) tail Habitat: Forest Diet: Seeds, nuts, bark, buds, leaves, flowers, and insects	VU Unknown
Nilgiri striped squirrel	F. sublineatus (Waterhouse, 1838) Two subspecies: F. s. obscurus; F. s. sublineatus	India	Size: 11–13 cm (4–5 in) long, plus 9–14 cm (4–6 in) tail Habitat: Forest Diet: Seeds, nuts, bark, buds, leaves, flowers, and insects	VU Unknown
Northern palm squirrel	F. pennantii Wroughton, 1905 Two subspecies: F. p. argentescens; F. p. pennantii	Southern Asia	Size: 13–16 cm (5–6 in) long, plus 13–14 cm (5–6 in) tail Habitat: Forest, shrubland, and grassland Diet: Seeds, nuts, bark, buds, leaves, flowers, and insects	LC Unknown

Genus Glyphotes – Thomas, 1898 – one species
Common name	Scientific name and subspecies	Range	Size and ecology	IUCN status and estimated population
Sculptor squirrel	G. simus Thomas, 1898	Borneo	Size: 9–15 cm (4–6 in) long, plus 9–11 cm (4 in) tail Habitat: Forest Diet: Fruit, nuts, seeds, flowers, vegetation, insects, and eggs	DD Unknown

Genus Hyosciurus – Archbold & Tate, 1935 – two species
Common name	Scientific name and subspecies	Range	Size and ecology	IUCN status and estimated population
Lowland long-nosed squirrel	H. ileile Archbold & Tate, 1936	Indonesia	Size: 21–25 cm (8–10 in) long, plus 7–13 cm (3–5 in) tail Habitat: Forest and shrubland Diet: Fruit, nuts, and insects	LC Unknown
Montane long-nosed squirrel	H. heinrichi Archbold & Tate, 1935	Indonesia	Size: 19–24 cm (7–9 in) long, plus 6–12 cm (2–5 in) tail Habitat: Forest Diet: Fruit, nuts, and insects	LC Unknown

Genus Lariscus – Thomas & Wroughton, 1909 – four species
Common name	Scientific name and subspecies	Range	Size and ecology	IUCN status and estimated population
Four-striped ground squirrel	L. hosei (Thomas, 1892)	Borneo	Size: About 19 cm (7 in) long, plus about 9 cm (4 in) tail Habitat: Forest Diet: Fruit and nuts	LC Unknown
Mentawai three-striped squirrel	L. obscurus (Miller, 1903) Three subspecies: L. o. auroreus; L. o. obscurus; L. o. siberu	Indonesia	Size: About 20 cm (8 in) long, plus 8–9 cm (3–4 in) tail Habitat: Forest and shrubland Diet: Fruit and nuts	NT Unknown
Niobe ground squirrel	L. niobe (Thomas, 1892) Two subspecies: L. n. niobe; L. n. vulcanus	Indonesia	Size: 18–20 cm (7–8 in) long, plus 8–9 cm (3–4 in) tail Habitat: Forest and shrubland Diet: Fruit and nuts	DD Unknown
Three-striped ground squirrel	L. insignis (F. Cuvier, 1821) Five subspecies: L. i. diversus; L. i. insignis; L. i. javanus; L. i. peninsulae; L. i. rostratus	Southeastern Asia	Size: 18–20 cm (7–8 in) long, plus 10–11 cm (4 in) tail Habitat: Forest Diet: Fruit and nuts	LC Unknown

Genus Menetes – Thomas, 1908 – one species
Common name	Scientific name and subspecies	Range	Size and ecology	IUCN status and estimated population
Berdmore's ground squirrel	M. berdmorei (Blyth, 1849) Seven subspecies: M. b. berdmorei; M. b. consularis; M. b. decoratus; M. b. moerescens; M. b. mouhotei; M. b. peninsularis; M. b. pyrrocephalus	Southeastern Asia	Size: About 18 cm (7 in) long, plus 13–14 cm (5–6 in) tail Habitat: Grassland, shrubland, and forest Diet: Fruit and nuts	LC Unknown

Genus Nannosciurus – Trouessart, 1880 – one species
Common name	Scientific name and subspecies	Range	Size and ecology	IUCN status and estimated population
Black-eared squirrel	N. melanotis (Müller, 1840) Four subspecies: N. m. bancanus; N. m. borneanus; N. m. melanotis; N. m. pulcher	Southeastern Asia	Size: About 8 cm (3 in) long, plus 6–7 cm (2–3 in) tail Habitat: Forest Diet: Fruit and nuts	LC Unknown

Genus Prosciurillus – Ellerman, 1947 – seven species
Common name	Scientific name and subspecies	Range	Size and ecology	IUCN status and estimated population
Alston's squirrel	P. alstoni Anderson, 1879	Indonesia	Size: 15–20 cm (6–8 in) long, plus 13–18 cm (5–7 in) tail Habitat: Forest Diet: Fruit, nuts, bark, and resin	NT Unknown
Mount Topapu squirrel	P. topapuensis Roux, 1910	Indonesia	Size: 15–19 cm (6–7 in) long, plus 12–17 cm (5–7 in) tail Habitat: Forest Diet: Fruit, nuts, bark, and resin	NT Unknown
Celebes dwarf squirrel	P. murinus (Müller & Schlegel, 1844) Three subspecies: P. m. griseus; P. m. murinus; P. m. necopinus	Indonesia	Size: 10–15 cm (4–6 in) long, plus 5–12 cm (2–5 in) tail Habitat: Forest Diet: Fruit, nuts, bark, and resin	LC Unknown
Sanghir squirrel	P. rosenbergii (Jentink, 1879)	Indonesia and Philippines	Size: About 19 cm (7 in) long, plus about 18 cm (7 in) tail Habitat: Forest Diet: Fruit, nuts, bark, and resin	EN Unknown
Secretive dwarf squirrel	P. abstrusus Moore, 1958	Indonesia	Size: 11–15 cm (4–6 in) long, plus 7–13 cm (3–5 in) tail Habitat: Forest Diet: Fruit, nuts, bark, and resin	NT Unknown
Weber's dwarf squirrel	P. weberi (Jentink, 1890)	Indonesia	Size: About 19 cm (7 in) long, plus about 14 cm (6 in) tail Habitat: Forest Diet: Fruit, nuts, bark, and resin	VU Unknown
Whitish dwarf squirrel	P. leucomus (Müller & Schlegel, 1844) Four subspecies: P. l. hirsutus; P. l. leucomus; P. l. occidentalis; P. l. tonkeanus	Indonesia	Size: 16–19 cm (6–7 in) long, plus 14–19 cm (6–7 in) tail Habitat: Forest Diet: Fruit, nuts, bark, and resin	LC Unknown

Genus Rhinosciurus – Blyth, 1856 – one species
Common name	Scientific name and subspecies	Range	Size and ecology	IUCN status and estimated population
Shrew-faced squirrel	R. laticaudatus (Müller, 1840) Three subspecies: R. l. alacris; R. l. laticaudatus; R. l. saturatus	Southeastern Asia	Size: 19–21 cm (7–8 in) long, plus 11–14 cm (4–6 in) tail Habitat: Forest Diet: Insects and earthworms, as well as fruit	NT Unknown

Genus Rubrisciurus – Ellerman, 1954 – one species
Common name	Scientific name and subspecies	Range	Size and ecology	IUCN status and estimated population
Red-bellied squirrel	R. rubriventer (Müller & Schlegel, 1844)	Island of Sulawesi in Indonesia	Size: 15–30 cm (6–12 in) long, plus 18–25 cm (7–10 in) tail Habitat: Forest Diet: Fruit and seeds	LC Unknown

Genus Sundasciurus – Moore, 1958 – fifteen species
Common name	Scientific name and subspecies	Range	Size and ecology	IUCN status and estimated population
Brooke's squirrel	S. brookei (Thomas, 1892)	Indonesia and Malaysia	Size: 15–16 cm (6 in) long, plus 11–13 cm (4–5 in) tail Habitat: Forest Diet: Fruit and vegetation, as well as insects	LC Unknown
Busuanga squirrel	S. hoogstraali (Sanborn, 1952)	Philippines	Size: About 20 cm (8 in) long, plus 16–17 cm (6–7 in) tail Habitat: Forest Diet: Fruit and vegetation, as well as insects	LC Unknown
Culion tree squirrel	S. moellendorffi (Matschie, 1898)	Philippines	Size: About 20 cm (8 in) long, plus about 19 cm (7 in) tail Habitat: Forest Diet: Fruit and vegetation, as well as insects	NT Unknown
Davao squirrel	S. davensis (Sanborn, 1952)	Philippines	Size: About 20 cm (8 in) long, plus about 18 cm (7 in) tail Habitat: Forest Diet: Fruit and vegetation, as well as insects	DD Unknown
Fraternal squirrel	S. fraterculus (Thomas, 1895)	Indonesia	Size: 11–12 cm (4–5 in) long, plus 7–8 cm (3 in) tail Habitat: Forest Diet: Fruit and vegetation, as well as insects	VU Unknown
Horse-tailed squirrel	S. hippurus (Geoffroy, 1831) Five subspecies: S. h. borneensis; S. h. hippurosus; S. h. hippurus; S. h. ornatus; S. h. pryeri	Southeastern Asia	Size: 23–25 cm (9–10 in) long, plus 23–25 cm (9–10 in) tail Habitat: Forest Diet: Fruit and vegetation, as well as insects	NT Unknown
Jentink's squirrel	S. jentinki (Thomas, 1887)	Indonesia and Malaysia	Size: 12–13 cm (5 in) long, plus 11–13 cm (4–5 in) tail Habitat: Forest Diet: Fruit and vegetation, as well as insects	LC Unknown
Low's squirrel	S. lowii (Thomas, 1892) Seven subspecies: S. l. balae; S. l. bangueyae; S. l. humilis; S. l. lowii; S. l. natunensis; S. l. robinsoni; S. l. seimundi	Southeastern Asia	Size: 12–17 cm (5–7 in) long, plus 7–11 cm (3–4 in) tail Habitat: Forest Diet: Fruit and vegetation, as well as insects	LC Unknown
Mindanao squirrel	S. mindanensis (Steere, 1890)	Philippines	Size: About 20 cm (8 in) long, plus about 19 cm (7 in) tail Habitat: Forest Diet: Fruit and vegetation, as well as insects	LC Unknown
Northern Palawan tree squirrel	S. juvencus (Thomas, 1908)	Philippines	Size: 19–20 cm (7–8 in) long, plus 15–18 cm (6–7 in) tail Habitat: Forest Diet: Fruit and vegetation, as well as insects	LC Unknown
Palawan montane squirrel	S. rabori Heaney, 1979	Philippines	Size: 16–19 cm (6–7 in) long, plus 13–14 cm (5–6 in) tail Habitat: Forest Diet: Fruit and vegetation, as well as insects	DD Unknown
Philippine tree squirrel	S. philippinensis (Waterhouse, 1839)	Philippines	Size: About 19 cm (7 in) long, plus 17–20 cm (7–8 in) tail Habitat: Forest Diet: Fruit and vegetation, as well as insects	LC Unknown
Samar squirrel	S. samarensis (Steere, 1890)	Philippines	Size: 18–20 cm (7–8 in) long, plus 15–17 cm (6–7 in) tail Habitat: Forest Diet: Fruit and vegetation, as well as insects	LC Unknown
Slender squirrel	S. tenuis (Horsfield, 1824) Five subspecies: S. t. bancarus; S. t. modestus; S. t. parvus; S. t. procerus; S. t. tenuis	Southeastern Asia	Size: About 14 cm (6 in) long, plus 11–12 cm (4–5 in) tail Habitat: Forest Diet: Fruit and vegetation, as well as insects	LC Unknown
Southern Palawan tree squirrel	S. steerii (Günther, 1877)	Philippines	Size: About 20 cm (8 in) long, plus about 16 cm (6 in) tail Habitat: Forest Diet: Fruit and vegetation, as well as insects	LC Unknown

Genus Tamiops – Allen, 1906 – four species
Common name	Scientific name and subspecies	Range	Size and ecology	IUCN status and estimated population
Cambodian striped squirrel	T. rodolphii (H. Milne-Edwards, 1867) Two subspecies: T. r. elbeli; T. r. rodolphii	Southeastern Asia	Size: 11–12 cm (4–5 in) long, plus 10–12 cm (4–5 in) tail Habitat: Forest and shrubland Diet: Fruit, nuts, seeds, and insects	LC Unknown
Himalayan striped squirrel	T. mcclellandii (Horsfield, 1840) Six subspecies: T. m. barbei; T. m. collinus; T. m. inconstans; T. m. kongensis; T. m. leucotis; T. m. mcclellandii	Southeastern Asia	Size: 11–12 cm (4–5 in) long, plus 10–11 cm (4 in) tail Habitat: Forest, shrubland, grassland, and inland wetlands Diet: Fruit, nuts, seeds, and insects	LC Unknown
Maritime striped squirrel	T. maritimus (Bonhote, 1900) Four subspecies: T. m. hainanus; T. m. maritimus; T. m. moi; T. m. monticolus	Southeastern and eastern Asia	Size: 11–13 cm (4–5 in) long, plus 10–11 cm (4 in) tail Habitat: Forest and shrubland Diet: Fruit, nuts, seeds, and insects	LC Unknown
Swinhoe's striped squirrel	T. swinhoei (H. Milne-Edwards, 1874) Four subspecies: T. s. olivaceus; T. s. spencei; T. s. swinhoei; T. s. vestitus	China and southeastern Asia	Size: About 13 cm (5 in) long, plus about 10 cm (4 in) tail Habitat: Forest and shrubland Diet: Fruit, nuts, seeds, and insects	LC Unknown

=== Subfamily Ratufinae ===
Genus Ratufa – Gray, 1867 – four species
Common name	Scientific name and subspecies	Range	Size and ecology	IUCN status and estimated population
Black giant squirrel	R. bicolor (Sparrman, 1778) Ten subspecies: R. b. bicolor; R. b. condorensis; R. b. felli; R. b. gigantea; R. b. hainana; R. b. leucogenys; R. b. melanopepla; R. b. palliata; R. b. phaeopepla; R. b. smithi	Southeastern Asia	Size: 33–36 cm (13–14 in) long, plus 41–42 cm (16–17 in) tail Habitat: Forest Diet: Fruit, nuts, bark, insects, and eggs	NT Unknown
Cream-coloured giant squirrel	R. affinis (Raffles, 1821) Nine subspecies: R. a. affinis; R. a. bancana; R. a. baramensis; R. a. bunguranensis; R. a. cothurnata; R. a. ephippium; R. a. hypoleucos; R. a. insignis; R. a. polia	Southeastern Asia	Size: 33–34 cm (13 in) long, plus 41–42 cm (16–17 in) tail Habitat: Forest Diet: Fruit, nuts, bark, insects, and eggs	NT Unknown
Grizzled giant squirrel	R. macroura (Pennant, 1769) Three subspecies: R. m. dandolena; R. m. macroura; R. m. melanochra	Southern India and Sri Lanka	Size: 32–40 cm (13–16 in) long, plus 35–36 cm (14 in) tail Habitat: Forest Diet: Fruit, nuts, bark, insects, and eggs	NT Unknown
Indian giant squirrel	R. indica (Erxleben, 1777) Four subspecies: R. i. centralis; R. i. dealbata; R. i. indica; R. i. maxima	India	Size: 34–45 cm (13–18 in) long, plus 38–49 cm (15–19 in) tail Habitat: Forest Diet: Fruit, nuts, bark, insects, and eggs	LC Unknown

=== Subfamily Sciurillinae ===
Genus Sciurillus – Thomas, 1914 – one species
Common name	Scientific name and subspecies	Range	Size and ecology	IUCN status and estimated population
Neotropical pygmy squirrel	S. pusillus (Geoffroy, 1803) Three subspecies: S. p. glaucinus; S. p. kuhlii; S. p. pusillus	Northern South America	Size: 8–12 cm (3–5 in) long, plus 8–12 cm (3–5 in) tail Habitat: Forest Diet: Fruit, nuts, bark, and resin	LC Unknown

=== Subfamily Sciurinae ===
Genus Aeretes – Allen, 1940 – one species
Common name	Scientific name and subspecies	Range	Size and ecology	IUCN status and estimated population
Groove-toothed flying squirrel	A. melanopterus (H. Milne-Edwards, 1867) Two subspecies: A. m. melanopterus; A. m. szechuanensis	Central China	Size: 27–35 cm (11–14 in) long, plus 27–36 cm (11–14 in) tail Habitat: Forest Diet: Nuts, fruit, twigs, shoots, leaves, bark and insects	LC Unknown

Genus Aeromys – Robinson & Kloss, 1915 – two species
Common name	Scientific name and subspecies	Range	Size and ecology	IUCN status and estimated population
Black flying squirrel	A. tephromelas (Günther, 1873) Two subspecies: A. t. phaeomelas; A. t. tephromelas	Southeastern Asia	Size: 37–38 cm (15 in) long, plus 39–44 cm (15–17 in) tail Habitat: Forest Diet: Fruit, nuts, leaves, and insects	DD Unknown
Thomas's flying squirrel	A. thomasi (Hose, 1900)	Indonesia and Malaysia	Size: 30–36 cm (12–14 in) long, plus 37–41 cm (15–16 in) tail Habitat: Forest Diet: Fruit, nuts, leaves, and insects	LC Unknown

Genus Belomys – Thomas, 1908 – one species
Common name	Scientific name and subspecies	Range	Size and ecology	IUCN status and estimated population
Hairy-footed flying squirrel	B. pearsonii (Gray, 1842) Two subspecies: B. p. blandus; B. p. pearsonii	Southeastern and eastern Asia	Size: 18–21 cm (7–8 in) long, plus 13–17 cm (5–7 in) tail Habitat: Forest Diet: Nuts, fruit, twigs, shoots, leaves, bark and insects	LC Unknown

Genus Biswamoyopterus – Saha, 1981 – two species
Common name	Scientific name and subspecies	Range	Size and ecology	IUCN status and estimated population
Laotian giant flying squirrel	B. laoensis Sanamxay, Douangboubpha, Bumrungsri, Xayavong, Xayaphet, Satasook, & Bates, 2013	Laos	Size: About 46 cm (18 in) long, plus about 62 cm (24 in) tail Habitat: Forest Diet: Unknown	DD Unknown
Namdapha flying squirrel	B. biswasi Saha, 1981	Eastern India	Size: About 40 cm (16 in) long, plus about 60 cm (24 in) tail Habitat: Forest Diet: Unknown	CR Unknown

Genus Eoglaucomys – Howell, 1915 – one species
Common name	Scientific name and subspecies	Range	Size and ecology	IUCN status and estimated population
Kashmir flying squirrel	E. fimbriatus (Gray, 1837) Two subspecies: E. f. baberi; E. f. fimbriatus	Central Asia	Size: 23–30 cm (9–12 in) long, plus 25–33 cm (10–13 in) tail Habitat: Forest Diet: Seeds, as well as shoots, buds, leaves, and nuts	LC Unknown

Genus Eupetaurus – Thomas, 1888 – one species
Common name	Scientific name and subspecies	Range	Size and ecology	IUCN status and estimated population
Western woolly flying squirrel	E. cinereus Thomas, 1888	Western China	Size: 42–61 cm (17–24 in) long, plus 38–54 cm (15–21 in) tail Habitat: Forest, rocky areas, and caves Diet: Moss and lichen	EN 1,000–3,000

Genus Glaucomys – Thomas, 1908 – two species
Common name	Scientific name and subspecies	Range	Size and ecology	IUCN status and estimated population
Northern flying squirrel	G. sabrinus (Shaw, 1801) 25 subspecies: G. s. alpinus; G. s. bangsi; G. s. californicus; G. s. canescens; G. s. coloratus; G. s. columbiensis; G. s. flaviventris; G. s. fuliginosus; G. s. fuscus; G. s. goodwini; G. s. gouldi; G. s. griseifrons (Prince of Wales flying squirrel); G. s. klamathensis; G. s. lascivus; G. s. latipes; G. s. lucifugus; G. s. macrotis; G. s. makkovikensis; G. s. murinauralis; G. s. oregonensis; G. s. reductus; G. s. sabrinus; G. s. stephensi; G. s. yukonensis; G. s. zaphaeus	Canada and northern United States	Size: 11–19 cm (4–7 in) long, plus 12–16 cm (5–6 in) tail Habitat: Forest Diet: Nuts, bark, lichen, fungi, fruit, and berries, as well as insects	LC Unknown
Southern flying squirrel	G. volans (Linnaeus, 1758) Eleven subspecies: G. v. chontali; G. v. goldmani; G. v. guerreroensis; G. v. herreranus; G. v. madrensis; G. v. oaxacensis; G. v. querceti; G. v. saturatus; G. v. texensis; G. v. underwoodi; G. v. volans	Eastern North America	Size: 11–14 cm (4–6 in) long, plus 8–12 cm (3–5 in) tail Habitat: Forest Diet: Nuts, bark, lichen, fungi, fruit, and berries, as well as insects	LC Unknown

Genus Hylopetes – Thomas, 1908 – nine species
Common name	Scientific name and subspecies	Range	Size and ecology	IUCN status and estimated population
Arrow flying squirrel	H. sagitta (Linnaeus, 1766)	Indonesia	Size: 11–13 cm (4–5 in) long, plus 9–13 cm (4–5 in) tail Habitat: Forest Diet: Nuts, shoots, leaves, fruit, insects, and small snakes	DD Unknown
Bartel's flying squirrel	H. bartelsi Chasen, 1939	Indonesia	Size: 13–20 cm (5–8 in) long, plus 11–12 cm (4–5 in) tail Habitat: Forest Diet: Nuts, shoots, leaves, fruit, insects, and small snakes	DD Unknown
Indochinese flying squirrel	H. phayrei (Blyth, 1859) Two subspecies: H. p. electilis; H. p. phayrei	Southeastern Asia	Size: 14–20 cm (6–8 in) long, plus 12–18 cm (5–7 in) tail Habitat: Forest Diet: Nuts, shoots, leaves, fruit, insects, and small snakes	LC Unknown
Jentink's flying squirrel	H. platyurus Jentink, 1890	Southeastern Asia	Size: 11–16 cm (4–6 in) long, plus 10–14 cm (4–6 in) tail Habitat: Forest Diet: Nuts, shoots, leaves, fruit, insects, and small snakes	DD Unknown
Palawan flying squirrel	H. nigripes (Thomas, 1893) Two subspecies: H. n. elassodontus; H. n. nigripes	Philippines	Size: 25–33 cm (10–13 in) long, plus 25–31 cm (10–12 in) tail Habitat: Forest Diet: Nuts, shoots, leaves, fruit, insects, and small snakes	NT Unknown
Particolored flying squirrel	H. alboniger (Hodgson, 1836) Three subspecies: H. a. alboniger; H. a. chianfengensis; H. a. orinus	Southeastern and eastern Asia	Size: 17–25 cm (7–10 in) long, plus 18–23 cm (7–9 in) tail Habitat: Forest and shrubland Diet: Nuts, shoots, leaves, fruit, insects, and small snakes	LC Unknown
Red-cheeked flying squirrel	H. spadiceus (Blyth, 1847) Two subspecies: H. s. caroli; H. s. spadiceus	Southeastern Asia	Size: 13–19 cm (5–7 in) long, plus 10–17 cm (4–7 in) tail Habitat: Forest and shrubland Diet: Nuts, shoots, leaves, fruit, insects, and small snakes	LC Unknown
Sipora flying squirrel	H. sipora Chasen, 1940	Indonesia	Size: About 14 cm (6 in) long, plus about 16 cm (6 in) tail Habitat: Forest Diet: Nuts, shoots, leaves, fruit, insects, and small snakes	EN Unknown
Sumatran flying squirrel	H. winstoni (Sody, 1949)	Indonesia	Size: About 14 cm (6 in) long, plus about 14 cm (6 in) tail Habitat: Forest Diet: Nuts, shoots, leaves, fruit, insects, and small snakes	DD Unknown

Genus Iomys – Thomas, 1908 – two species
Common name	Scientific name and subspecies	Range	Size and ecology	IUCN status and estimated population
Javanese flying squirrel	I. horsfieldii (Waterhouse, 1838) Four subspecies: I. h. davisoni; I. h. horsfieldii; I. h. penangensis; I. h. thomsoni	Southeastern Asia	Size: 16–23 cm (6–9 in) long, plus 15–21 cm (6–8 in) tail Habitat: Forest and shrubland Diet: Nuts, fruit, twigs, shoots, leaves, bark and insects	LC Unknown
Mentawi flying squirrel	I. sipora Chasen & Kloss, 1928	Indonesia	Size: 17–20 cm (7–8 in) long, plus 17–20 cm (7–8 in) tail Habitat: Forest Diet: Nuts, fruit, twigs, shoots, leaves, bark and insects	EN Unknown

Genus Microsciurus – Allen, 1895 – four species
Common name	Scientific name and subspecies	Range	Size and ecology	IUCN status and estimated population
Amazon dwarf squirrel	M. flaviventer (Gray, 1867) Eight subspecies: M. f. flaviventer; M. f. napi; M. f. otinus; M. f. peruanus; M. f. rubrirostris; M. f. sabanillae; M. f. similis; M. f. simonsi	Northwestern South America	Size: 12–16 cm (5–6 in) long, plus 9–15 cm (4–6 in) tail Habitat: Forest Diet: Fruit and nuts	LC Unknown
Central American dwarf squirrel	M. alfari (Allen, 1895) Six subspecies: M. a. alfari; M. a. alticola; M. a. browni; M. a. fusculus; M. a. septentrionalis; M. a. venustulus	Central America and northern South America	Size: 10–15 cm (4–6 in) long, plus 8–13 cm (3–5 in) tail Habitat: Forest Diet: Fruit and nuts	LC Unknown
Santander dwarf squirrel	M. santanderensis (Hernández-Camacho, 1957)	Northern South America	Size: 13–16 cm (5–6 in) long, plus 13–16 cm (5–6 in) tail Habitat: Forest Diet: Fruit and nuts	DD Unknown
Western dwarf squirrel	M. mimulus (Thomas, 1898) Three subspecies: M. m. boquetensis; M. m. isthmius; M. m. mimulus	Central America and northern South America	Size: 13–15 cm (5–6 in) long, plus 9–12 cm (4–5 in) tail Habitat: Forest Diet: Fruit and nuts	LC Unknown

Genus Petaurillus – Thomas, 1908 – three species
Common name	Scientific name and subspecies	Range	Size and ecology	IUCN status and estimated population
Hose's pygmy flying squirrel	P. hosei (Thomas, 1900)	Island of Borneo	Size: 7–9 cm (3–4 in) long, plus 8–10 cm (3–4 in) tail Habitat: Forest Diet: Nuts, fruit, twigs, shoots, leaves, bark and insects	DD Unknown
Lesser pygmy flying squirrel	P. emiliae Thomas, 1908	Borneo	Size: 6–8 cm (2–3 in) long, plus 6–7 cm (2–3 in) tail Habitat: Forest Diet: Nuts, fruit, twigs, shoots, leaves, bark and insects	DD Unknown
Selangor pygmy flying squirrel	P. kinlochii (Chasen & Kloss, 1928)	Malaysia	Size: 8–10 cm (3–4 in) long, plus 8–10 cm (3–4 in) tail Habitat: Forest Diet: Nuts, fruit, twigs, shoots, leaves, bark and insects	DD Unknown

Genus Petaurista – Link, 1795 – ten species
Common name	Scientific name and subspecies	Range	Size and ecology	IUCN status and estimated population
Bhutan giant flying squirrel	P. nobilis (Gray, 1842) Two subspecies: P. n. nobilis; P. n. singhei	Bhutan and Nepal	Size: 35–49 cm (14–19 in) long, plus 38–49 cm (15–19 in) tail Habitat: Forest Diet: Fruit, nuts, twigs, shoots, and leaves, as well as insects	NT Unknown
Chinese giant flying squirrel	P. xanthotis (H. Milne-Edwards, 1872)	Central China	Size: 32–44 cm (13–17 in) long, plus 29–38 cm (11–15 in) tail Habitat: Forest Diet: Fruit, nuts, twigs, shoots, and leaves, as well as insects	LC Unknown
Hodgson's giant flying squirrel	P. magnificus (Hodgson, 1836)	Central Asia	Size: 36–42 cm (14–17 in) long, plus 41–55 cm (16–22 in) tail Habitat: Forest Diet: Fruit, nuts, twigs, shoots, and leaves, as well as insects	LC Unknown
Indian giant flying squirrel	P. philippensis (Elliot, 1839) Seven subspecies: P. p. annamensis; P. p. cineraceus; P. p. grandis; P. p. lylei; P. p. mergulus; P. p. philippensis; P. p. yunanensis	Southern, eastern, and southeastern Asia	Size: 38–61 cm (15–24 in) long, plus 48–69 cm (19–27 in) tail Habitat: Forest Diet: Fruit, nuts, twigs, shoots, and leaves, as well as insects	LC Unknown
Japanese giant flying squirrel	P. leucogenys Temminck, 1827 Four subspecies: P. l. hintoni; P. l. leucogenys; P. l. nikkonis; P. l. oreas	Japan	Size: 27–48 cm (11–19 in) long, plus 28–41 cm (11–16 in) tail Habitat: Forest Diet: Fruit, nuts, twigs, shoots, and leaves, as well as insects	LC Unknown
Mechuka giant flying squirrel	P. mechukaensis Choudhury, 2009	Northeastern India	Size: 46–53 cm (18–21 in) long, plus 52–77 cm (20–30 in) tail Habitat: Forest Diet: Fruit, nuts, twigs, shoots, and leaves, as well as insects	NT Unknown
Mishmi giant flying squirrel	P. mishmiensis Choudhury, 2009	Northeastern India	Size: 40–59 cm (16–23 in) long, plus 57–60 cm (22–24 in) tail Habitat: Forest Diet: Fruit, nuts, twigs, shoots, and leaves, as well as insects	NT Unknown
Red and white giant flying squirrel	P. alborufus (A. Milne-Edwards, 1870) Five subspecies: P. a. alborufus; P. a. castaneus; P. a. lena; P. a. leucocephalus; P. a. ochraspis	China and Taiwan	Size: 35–58 cm (14–23 in) long, plus 40–61 cm (16–24 in) tail Habitat: Forest and rocky areas Diet: Fruit, nuts, twigs, shoots, and leaves, as well as insects	LC Unknown
Red giant flying squirrel	P. petaurista (Pallas, 1766) Eighteen subspecies: P. p. albiventer; P. p. batuana; P. p. candidula; P. p. cicur; P. p. interceptio; P. p. lumholtzi; P. p. marchio; P. p. melanotus; P. p. nigrescens; P. p. nigricaudatus; P. p. nitidula; P. p. penangensis; P. p. petaurista; P. p. rajah; P. p. rufipes; P. p. stellaris; P. p. taylori; P. p. terutaus	Southern, eastern, and southeastern Asia	Size: 28–52 cm (11–20 in) long, plus 34–63 cm (13–25 in) tail Habitat: Forest Diet: Fruit, nuts, twigs, shoots, and leaves, as well as insects	LC Unknown
Spotted giant flying squirrel	P. elegans (Müller, 1840) Seven subspecies: P. e. banksi; P. e. caniceps; P. e. elegans; P. e. marica; P. e. punctatus; P. e. sumatrana; P. e. sybilla	Southeastern Asia	Size: Unknown Habitat: Forest Diet: Fruit, nuts, twigs, shoots, and leaves, as well as insects	LC Unknown

Genus Petinomys – Thomas, 1908 – eight species
Common name	Scientific name and subspecies	Range	Size and ecology	IUCN status and estimated population
Basilan flying squirrel	P. crinitus (Hollister, 1911)	Philippines	Size: About 31 cm (12 in) long, plus about 26 cm (10 in) tail Habitat: Forest Diet: Nuts, fruit, twigs, shoots, and leaves, as well as bark and insects	LC Unknown
Hagen's flying squirrel	P. hageni (Jentink, 1888)	Indonesia	Size: 23–28 cm (9–11 in) long, plus 23–25 cm (9–10 in) tail Habitat: Forest Diet: Nuts, fruit, twigs, shoots, and leaves, as well as bark and insects	DD Unknown
Mindanao flying squirrel	P. mindanensis Rabor, 1939	Philippines	Size: 32–37 cm (13–15 in) long, plus 34–46 cm (13–18 in) tail Habitat: Forest Diet: Nuts, fruit, twigs, shoots, and leaves, as well as bark and insects	LC Unknown
Siberut flying squirrel	P. lugens (Thomas, 1895)	Indonesia	Size: 23–28 cm (9–11 in) long, plus 21–23 cm (8–9 in) tail Habitat: Forest Diet: Nuts, fruit, twigs, shoots, and leaves, as well as bark and insects	VU Unknown
Temminck's flying squirrel	P. setosus (Temminck, 1844)	Southeastern Asia	Size: 9–13 cm (4–5 in) long, plus 8–12 cm (3–5 in) tail Habitat: Forest Diet: Nuts, fruit, twigs, shoots, and leaves, as well as bark and insects	VU Unknown
Travancore flying squirrel	P. fuscocapillus (Jerdon, 1847)	Southern India	Size: 18–34 cm (7–13 in) long, plus 24–29 cm (9–11 in) tail Habitat: Forest Diet: Nuts, fruit, twigs, shoots, and leaves, as well as bark and insects	LC Unknown
Vordermann's flying squirrel	P. vordermanni (Jentink, 1890)	Southeastern Asia	Size: 9–12 cm (4–5 in) long, plus 8–12 cm (3–5 in) tail Habitat: Forest Diet: Nuts, fruit, twigs, shoots, and leaves, as well as bark and insects	VU Unknown
Whiskered flying squirrel	P. genibarbis (Horsfield, 1822)	Indonesia and Malaysia	Size: 14–20 cm (6–8 in) long, plus 15–20 cm (6–8 in) tail Habitat: Forest Diet: Nuts, fruit, twigs, shoots, and leaves, as well as bark and insects	VU Unknown

Genus Pteromys – Cuvier, 1800 – two species
Common name	Scientific name and subspecies	Range	Size and ecology	IUCN status and estimated population
Japanese dwarf flying squirrel	P. momonga Temminck, 1844	Japan	Size: 14–20 cm (6–8 in) long, plus 9–14 cm (4–6 in) tail Habitat: Forest Diet: Nuts, pine seeds, buds, bark, fruit, and insects	LC Unknown
Siberian flying squirrel	P. volans (Linnaeus, 1758) Four subspecies: P. v. athene; P. v. buechneri; P. v. orii (Ezo flying squirrel); P. v. volans	Northern Asia and northern Europe	Size: 12–23 cm (5–9 in) long, plus 9–15 cm (4–6 in) tail Habitat: Forest Diet: Nuts, pine seeds, buds, bark, fruit, and insects	LC Unknown

Genus Pteromyscus – Thomas, 1908 – one species
Common name	Scientific name and subspecies	Range	Size and ecology	IUCN status and estimated population
Smoky flying squirrel	P. pulverulentus (Günther, 1873) Two subspecies: P. p. borneanus; P. p. pulverulentus	Southeastern Asia	Size: 20–29 cm (8–11 in) long, plus 17–23 cm (7–9 in) tail Habitat: Forest Diet: Nuts, fruit, twigs, shoots, leaves, bark and insects	EN Unknown

Genus Rheithrosciurus – Gray, 1867 – one species
Common name	Scientific name and subspecies	Range	Size and ecology	IUCN status and estimated population
Tufted ground squirrel	R. macrotis (Gray, 1856)	Borneo	Size: 33–35 cm (13–14 in) long, plus 30–34 cm (12–13 in) tail Habitat: Forest Diet: Fruit and nuts	VU Unknown

Genus Sciurus – Linnaeus, 1758 – 29 species
Common name	Scientific name and subspecies	Range	Size and ecology	IUCN status and estimated population
Abert's squirrel	S. aberti Woodhouse, 1853 Six subspecies: S. a. aberti; S. a. barberi; S. a. chuscensis; S. a. durangi; S. a. ferreus; S. a. kaibabensis (Kaibab squirrel)	Western United States and western Mexico	Size: 26–27 cm (10–11 in) long, plus 21–22 cm (8–9 in) tail Habitat: Forest Diet: Nuts, seeds, fruit, buds, and tree shoots	LC Unknown
Allen's squirrel	S. alleni Nelson, 1898	Mexico	Size: 22–25 cm (9–10 in) long, plus 22–25 cm (9–10 in) tail Habitat: Forest Diet: Nuts, seeds, fruit, buds, and tree shoots	LC Unknown
Andean squirrel	S. pucheranii (Fitzinger, 1867) Three subspecies: S. p. caucensis; S. p. medellinensis; S. p. pucheranii	Northwestern South America	Size: 14–19 cm (6–7 in) long, plus 11–16 cm (4–6 in) tail Habitat: Forest Diet: Nuts, seeds, fruit, buds, and tree shoots	DD Unknown
Arizona gray squirrel	S. arizonensis Coues, 1867 Three subspecies: S. a. arizonensis; S. a. catalinae; S. a. huachuca	Western United States and western Mexico	Size: 25–26 cm (10 in) long, plus about 25 cm (10 in) tail Habitat: Forest, shrubland, and grassland Diet: Nuts, seeds, fruit, buds, and tree shoots	NT Unknown
Bolivian squirrel	S. ignitus (Gray, 1867) Five subspecies: S. i. argentinius; S. i. boliviensis; S. i. cabrerai; S. i. ignitus; S. i. irroratus	Western South America	Size: 14–22 cm (6–9 in) long, plus 15–23 cm (6–9 in) tail Habitat: Forest Diet: Nuts, seeds, fruit, buds, and tree shoots	LC Unknown
Brazilian squirrel	S. aestuans Linnaeus, 1766 Ten subspecies: S. a. aestuans; S. a. alphonsei; S. a. garbei; S. a. georgihernandezi; S. a. henseli; S. a. ingrami; S. a. macconnelli; S. a. poaiae; S. a. quelchii; S. a. venustus	South America	Size: 16–19 cm (6–7 in) long, plus 16–25 cm (6–10 in) tail Habitat: Forest Diet: Nuts, seeds, fruit, buds, and tree shoots	LC Unknown
Calabrian black squirrel	S. meridionalis Lucifero, 1907	Southern Italy	Size: Unknown Habitat: Forest Diet: Nuts, seeds, fruit, buds, and tree shoots	NT Unknown
Caucasian squirrel	S. anomalus Gmelin, 1778 Three subspecies: S. a. anomalus; S. a. pallescens; S. a. syriacus	Western Asia	Size: 19–25 cm (7–10 in) long, plus 12–17 cm (5–7 in) tail Habitat: Forest Diet: Nuts, seeds, fruit, buds, and tree shoots	LC Unknown
Collie's squirrel	S. colliaei Richardson, 1839 Four subspecies: S. c. colliaei; S. c. nuchalis; S. c. sinaloensis; S. c. truei	Western Mexico	Size: 24–25 cm (9–10 in) long, plus 24–26 cm (9–10 in) tail Habitat: Forest Diet: Nuts, seeds, fruit, buds, and tree shoots	LC Unknown
Deppe's squirrel	S. deppei Peters, 1863 Five subspecies: S. d. deppei; S. d. matagalpae; S. d. miravallensis; S. d. negligens; S. d. vivax	Southern Mexico and Central America	Size: About 21 cm (8 in) long, plus 17–18 cm (7 in) tail Habitat: Forest Diet: Nuts, seeds, fruit, buds, and tree shoots	LC Unknown
Eastern gray squirrel	S. carolinensis Gmelin, 1788 Five subspecies: S. c. carolinensis (Carolina gray squirrel); S. c. extimus (Florida gray squirrel); S. c. fuliginosus (Louisiana gray squirrel); S. c. hypophaeus (Merriam's gray squirrel); S. c. pennsylvanicus (Pennsylvania gray squirrel)	Canada and eastern United States	Size: 20–31 cm (8–12 in) long, plus 15–25 cm (6–10 in) tail Habitat: Forest Diet: Nuts, seeds, fruit, buds, and tree shoots	LC Unknown
Fiery squirrel	S. flammifer Thomas, 1904	Venezuela	Size: 27–30 cm (11–12 in) long, plus 24–31 cm (9–12 in) tail Habitat: Forest Diet: Nuts, seeds, fruit, buds, and tree shoots	DD Unknown
Fox squirrel	S. niger Linnaeus, 1758 Ten subspecies: S. n. avicinnia (Mangrove fox squirrel); S. n. bachmani (Upland fox squirrel); S. n. cinereus (Delmarva fox squirrel); S. n. limitis (Texas fox squirrel); S. n. ludovicianus (Pineywoods fox squirrel); S. n. niger (Southern fox squirrel); S. n. rufiventer (Western fox squirrel); S. n. shermani (Sherman's fox squirrel); S. n. subauratus (Delta fox squirrel); S. n. vulpinus (Eastern fox squirrel)	Canada and United States	Size: 26–37 cm (10–15 in) long, plus 20–33 cm (8–13 in) tail Habitat: Forest Diet: Nuts, seeds, fruit, buds, and tree shoots	LC Unknown
Guayaquil squirrel	S. stramineus Eydoux & Souleyet, 1841	Ecuador and Peru	Size: 18–32 cm (7–13 in) long, plus 25–33 cm (10–13 in) tail Habitat: Forest Diet: Nuts, seeds, fruit, buds, and tree shoots	LC Unknown
Japanese squirrel	S. lis Temminck, 1844	Japan	Size: 16–22 cm (6–9 in) long, plus 13–17 cm (5–7 in) tail Habitat: Forest Diet: Nuts, seeds, fruit, buds, and tree shoots	LC Unknown
Junín red squirrel	S. pyrrhinus Thomas, 1898	Ecuador and Peru	Size: 24–25 cm (9–10 in) long, plus 21–25 cm (8–10 in) tail Habitat: Forest Diet: Nuts, seeds, fruit, buds, and tree shoots	DD Unknown
Mexican fox squirrel	S. nayaritensis Allen, 1890 Three subspecies: S. n. apache (Apache fox squirrel); S. n. chiricahuae (Chiricahua fox squirrel); S. n. nayaritensis (Nayarit fox squirrel)	Mexico and southern United States	Size: 25–26 cm (10 in) long, plus about 25 cm (10 in) tail Habitat: Forest Diet: Nuts, seeds, fruit, buds, and tree shoots	LC Unknown
Mexican gray squirrel	S. aureogaster F. Cuvier, 1829 Two subspecies: S. a. aureogaster; S. a. nigrescens	Mexico and Guatemala	Size: 23–31 cm (9–12 in) long, plus 21–28 cm (8–11 in) tail Habitat: Forest Diet: Nuts, seeds, fruit, buds, and tree shoots	LC Unknown
Northern Amazon red squirrel	S. igniventris Wagner, 1842 Two subspecies: S. i. cocalis; S. i. igniventris	Northwestern South America	Size: 24–29 cm (9–11 in) long, plus 24–29 cm (9–11 in) tail Habitat: Forest Diet: Nuts, seeds, fruit, buds, and tree shoots	LC Unknown
Peters's squirrel	S. oculatus Peters, 1863 Three subspecies: S. o. oculatus; S. o. shawi; S. o. tolucae	Central Mexico	Size: 51–56 cm (20–22 in) long, plus 26–27 cm (10–11 in) tail Habitat: Forest Diet: Nuts, seeds, fruit, buds, and tree shoots	LC Unknown
Red squirrel	S. vulgaris Linnaeus, 1758 23 subspecies: S. v. alpinus; S. v. altaicus (Altai red squirrel); S. v. anadyrensis (Anadyr red squirrel); S. v. arcticus (Arcticai red squirrel); S. v. balcanicus (Balkan red squirrel); S. v. chiliensis; S. v. cinerea; S. v. dulkeiti; S. v. exalbidus (Siberian red squirrel); S. v. fedjushini; S. v. formosovi (Formosov's red squirrel); S. v. fuscoater (Central European red squirrel); S. v. fusconigricans (Transbaikal red squirrel); S. v. leucourus (British red squirrel); S. v. lilaeus; S. v. mantchuricus (Manchurian red squirrel); S. v. martensi (West Siberian red squirrel); S. v. ognevi (Central Russian red squirrel); S. v. orientis (Japanese red squirrel); S. v. rupestris (Sakhalin red squirrel); S. v. ukrainicus (Ukrainian red squirrel); S. v. varius (Kola red squirrel); S. v. vulgaris (Scandinavian red squirrel)	Europe and Asia	Size: 21–25 cm (8–10 in) long, plus 15–20 cm (6–8 in) tail Habitat: Forest Diet: Nuts, seeds, fruit, buds, and tree shoots	LC Unknown
Red-tailed squirrel	S. granatensis (Humboldt, 1811) 32 subspecies: S. g. agricolae; S. g. bondae; S. g. candelensis; S. g. carchensis; S. g. chapmani; S. g. chiriquensis; S. g. chrysuros; S. g. ferminae; S. g. gerrardi; S. g. granatensis; S. g. griseimembra; S. g. griseogena; S. g. hoffmanni; S. g. imbaburae; S. g. llanensis; S. g. manavi; S. g. maracaibensis; S. g. meridensis; S. g. morulus; S. g. nesaeus; S. g. norosiensis; S. g. perijae; S. g. quindianus; S. g. saltuensis; S. g. soederstroemi; S. g. splendidus; S. g. sumaco; S. g. tarrae; S. g. valdiviae; S. g. variabilis; S. g. versicolor; S. g. zuliae	Northwestern South America and Central America	Size: 20–28 cm (8–11 in) long, plus 14–28 cm (6–11 in) tail Habitat: Forest Diet: Nuts, seeds, fruit, buds, and tree shoots	LC Unknown
Richmond's squirrel	S. richmondi Nelson, 1898	Nicaragua	Size: 16–22 cm (6–9 in) long, plus 13–19 cm (5–7 in) tail Habitat: Forest Diet: Nuts, seeds, fruit, buds, and tree shoots	NT Unknown
Sanborn's squirrel	S. sanborni Osgood, 1944	Peru and Bolivia	Size: 15–18 cm (6–7 in) long, plus 16–19 cm (6–7 in) tail Habitat: Forest Diet: Nuts, seeds, fruit, buds, and tree shoots	DD Unknown
Southern Amazon red squirrel	S. spadiceus Olfers, 1818 Three subspecies: S. s. spadiceus; S. s. steinbachi; S. s. tricolor	Northwestern South America	Size: 24–29 cm (9–11 in) long, plus 23–34 cm (9–13 in) tail Habitat: Forest Diet: Nuts, seeds, fruit, buds, and tree shoots	LC Unknown
Variegated squirrel	S. variegatoides Ogilby, 1839 Fifteen subspecies: S. v. adolphei; S. v. atrirufus; S. v. bangsi; S. v. belti; S. v. boothiae; S. v. dorsalis; S. v. goldmani; S. v. helveolus; S. v. loweryi; S. v. managuensis; S. v. melania; S. v. rigidus; S. v. thomasi; S. v. underwoodi; S. v. variegatoides	Southern Mexico and Central America	Size: About 26 cm (10 in) long, plus 26–28 cm (10–11 in) tail Habitat: Forest Diet: Nuts, seeds, fruit, buds, and tree shoots	LC Unknown
Western gray squirrel	S. griseus Ord, 1818 Three subspecies: S. g. anthonyi; S. g. griseus; S. g. nigripes	Western United States and western Mexico	Size: 26–32 cm (10–13 in) long, plus 24–31 cm (9–12 in) tail Habitat: Forest Diet: Nuts, seeds, fruit, buds, and tree shoots	LC Unknown
Yellow-throated squirrel	S. gilvigularis Wagner, 1842 Two subspecies: S. g. gilvigularis; S. g. paraensis	Northern South America	Size: 15–18 cm (6–7 in) long, plus 16–20 cm (6–8 in) tail Habitat: Forest Diet: Nuts, seeds, fruit, buds, and tree shoots	DD Unknown
Yucatan squirrel	S. yucatanensis Allen, 1877 Three subspecies: S. y. baliolus; S. y. phaeopus; S. y. yucatanensis	Southern Mexico and Central America	Size: 20–32 cm (8–13 in) long, plus 19–27 cm (7–11 in) tail Habitat: Forest Diet: Nuts, seeds, fruit, buds, and tree shoots	LC Unknown

Genus Syntheosciurus – Bangs, 1902 – one species
Common name	Scientific name and subspecies	Range	Size and ecology	IUCN status and estimated population
Bangs's mountain squirrel	S. brochus Bangs, 1902	Costa Rica and Panama	Size: 15–19 cm (6–7 in) long, plus 12–16 cm (5–6 in) tail Habitat: Forest Diet: Flowers, buds, leaves, and sap	DD Unknown

Genus Tamiasciurus – Trouessart, 1880 – three species
Common name	Scientific name and subspecies	Range	Size and ecology	IUCN status and estimated population
American red squirrel	T. hudsonicus (Erxleben, 1777) 24 subspecies: T. h. abieticola (Southern Appalachian red squirrel); T. h. baileyi (Bailey's red squirrel); T. h. dakotensis (Black Hills red squirrel); T. h. dixiensis; T. h. fremonti; T. h. grahamensis (Mount Graham red squirrel); T. h. gymnicus (Gymnastic red squirrel); T. h. hudsonicus (Wind River Mountains red squirrel); T. h. kenaiensis (Cook Inlet red squirrel); T. h. lanuginosus (Vancouver Island red squirrel); T. h. laurentianus; T. h. loquax (Southern red squirrel); T. h. lychnuchus; T. h. minnesota (Minnesota red squirrel); T. h. mogollonensis; T. h. pallescens (North Dakota red squirrel); T. h. petulans; T. h. picatus (Kupreanof red squirrel); T. h. preblei (Mackenzie red squirrel); T. h. regalis (Isle Royale red squirrel); T. h. richardsoni (Columbia red squirrel); T. h. streatori; T. h. ungavensis; T. h. ventorum	Canada and United States	Size: 18–19 cm (7 in) long, plus about 12 cm (5 in) tail Habitat: Forest Diet: Nuts, buds, fruit, bark, fungi, sap, eggs, and small vertebrates	LC Unknown
Douglas squirrel	T. douglasii (Bachman, 1880) Two subspecies: T. d. douglasii; T. d. mollipilosus (Soft-haired squirrel)	Western Canada and western United States	Size: 18–19 cm (7 in) long, plus 11–15 cm (4–6 in) tail Habitat: Forest Diet: Nuts, buds, fruit, bark, fungi, sap, eggs, and small vertebrates	LC Unknown
Mearns's squirrel	T. mearnsi (Townsend, 1897)	Mexico	Size: 18–19 cm (7 in) long, plus 11–15 cm (4–6 in) tail Habitat: Forest Diet: Nuts, buds, fruit, bark, fungi, sap, eggs, and small vertebrates	EN Unknown

Genus Trogopterus – Heude, 1898 – one species
Common name	Scientific name and subspecies	Range	Size and ecology	IUCN status and estimated population
Complex-toothed flying squirrel	T. xanthipes (H. Milne-Edwards, 1867)	Southern China	Size: 20–33 cm (8–13 in) long, plus 26–30 cm (10–12 in) tail Habitat: Forest and caves Diet: Leaves, twigs, fruit, and nuts	NT Unknown

=== Subfamily Xerinae ===
Genus Ammospermophilus – Merriam, 1892 – four species
Common name	Scientific name and subspecies	Range	Size and ecology	IUCN status and estimated population
Harris's antelope squirrel	A. harrisii (Audubon & Bachman, 1854) Two subspecies: A. h. harrisii; A. h. saxicolus	Western United States and western Mexico	Size: 27–28 cm (11 in) long, plus 6–10 cm (2–4 in) tail Habitat: Desert Diet: Seeds, fruit, stems, and roots, as well as insects and carrion	LC Unknown
San Joaquin antelope squirrel	A. nelsoni (Merriam, 1893)	Western United States	Size: 23–27 cm (9–11 in) long, plus 6–8 cm (2–3 in) tail Habitat: Shrubland, grassland, and desert Diet: Seeds, fruit, stems, and roots, as well as insects and carrion	EN Unknown
Texas antelope squirrel	A. interpres (Merriam, 1890)	Southwestern United States	Size: 22–23 cm (9 in) long, plus 6–9 cm (2–4 in) tail Habitat: Shrubland, grassland, and desert Diet: Seeds, fruit, stems, and roots, as well as insects and carrion	LC Unknown
White-tailed antelope squirrel	A. leucurus (Merriam, 1889) Nine subspecies: A. l. canfieldiae; A. l. cinamomeus; A. l. escalante; A. l. extimus; A. l. leucurus; A. l. notom; A. l. peninsulae; A. l. pennipes; A. l. tersus	Western United States and western Mexico	Size: 18–22 cm (7–9 in) long, plus 4–8 cm (2–3 in) tail Habitat: Desert, shrubland, and forest Diet: Seeds, fruit, stems, and roots, as well as insects and carrion	LC Unknown

Genus Atlantoxerus – Forsyth Major, 1893 – one species
Common name	Scientific name and subspecies	Range	Size and ecology	IUCN status and estimated population
Barbary ground squirrel	A. getulus (Linnaeus, 1758)	Northwestern Africa	Size: About 17 cm (7 in) long, plus about 13 cm (5 in) tail Habitat: Rocky areas, grassland, and shrubland Diet: Fruit and seeds	LC Unknown

Genus Callospermophilus – Merriam, 1897 – three species
Common name	Scientific name and subspecies	Range	Size and ecology	IUCN status and estimated population
Cascade golden-mantled ground squirrel	C. saturatus (Rhoads, 1895)	Western United States and western Canada	Size: 28–31 cm (11–12 in) long, plus 9–12 cm (4–5 in) tail Habitat: Rocky areas, grassland, shrubland, and forest Diet: Seeds, nuts, grains, roots, bulbs, fungi, vegetation, and insects, as well as small vertebrates and eggs	LC Unknown
Golden-mantled ground squirrel	C. lateralis (Say, 1823)	Western United States and western Canada	Size: About 18 cm (7 in) long, plus 8–9 cm (3–4 in) tail Habitat: Forest, shrubland, and rocky areas Diet: Seeds, nuts, grains, roots, bulbs, fungi, vegetation, and insects, as well as small vertebrates and eggs	LC Unknown
Sierra Madre ground squirrel	C. madrensis Merriam, 1901	Western Mexico	Size: 16–17 cm (6–7 in) long, plus 6–7 cm (2–3 in) tail Habitat: Forest Diet: Seeds, nuts, grains, roots, bulbs, fungi, vegetation, and insects, as well as small vertebrates and eggs	NT Unknown

Genus Cynomys – Rafinesque, 1817 – five species
Common name	Scientific name and subspecies	Range	Size and ecology	IUCN status and estimated population
Black-tailed prairie dog	C. ludovicianus (Ord, 1815) Two subspecies: C. l. arizonensis; C. l. ludovicianus	Central North America	Size: About 37 cm (15 in) long, plus 8–9 cm (3–4 in) tail Habitat: Desert, grassland, and savanna Diet: Herbs and grasses	LC Unknown
Gunnison's prairie dog	C. gunnisoni (Baird, 1855) Two subspecies: C. g. gunnisoni; C. g. zuniensis	Southwestern United States	Size: 31–39 cm (12–15 in) long, plus 4–7 cm (2–3 in) tail Habitat: Shrubland, grassland, and desert Diet: Herbs and grasses	LC Unknown
Mexican prairie dog	C. mexicanus Merriam, 1892	Northern Mexico	Size: 38–44 cm (15–17 in) long, plus 10–11 cm (4 in) tail Habitat: Grassland Diet: Herbs and grasses	EN Unknown
Utah prairie dog	C. parvidens Allen, 1905	Western United States	Size: 29–37 cm (11–15 in) long, plus 4–7 cm (2–3 in) tail Habitat: Grassland Diet: Herbs and grasses	EN Unknown
White-tailed prairie dog	C. leucurus Merriam, 1890	Western United States	Size: 35–37 cm (14–15 in) long, plus 5–6 cm (2 in) tail Habitat: Shrubland and grassland Diet: Herbs and grasses	LC Unknown

Genus Epixerus – Thomas, 1909 – one species
Common name	Scientific name and subspecies	Range	Size and ecology	IUCN status and estimated population
Ebian's palm squirrel	E. ebii (Temminck, 1853) Three subspecies: E. e. ebii; E. e. jonesi; E. e. wilsoni	Western Africa	Size: 28–29 cm (11 in) long, plus about 28 cm (11 in) tail Habitat: Forest Diet: Fruit as well as insects	LC Unknown

Genus Eutamias – Trouessart, 1880 – one species
Common name	Scientific name and subspecies	Range	Size and ecology	IUCN status and estimated population
Siberian chipmunk	E. sibiricus Laxmann, 1769	Northern and eastern Asia and Europe	Size: 14–15 cm (6 in) long, plus 10–12 cm (4–5 in) tail Habitat: Forest and shrubland Diet: Nuts and seeds, as well as buds, berries, grains, and fungi	LC Unknown

Genus Funisciurus – Trouessart, 1880 – ten species
Common name	Scientific name and subspecies	Range	Size and ecology	IUCN status and estimated population
Carruther's mountain squirrel	F. carruthersi Thomas, 1906 Four subspecies: F. c. birungensis; F. c. carruthersi; F. c. chrysippus; F. c. tanganyikae	Central Africa	Size: 21–22 cm (8–9 in) long, plus 18–19 cm (7 in) tail Habitat: Forest Diet: Seeds, nuts, and fruit, as well as insects and eggs	LC Unknown
Congo rope squirrel	F. congicus (Kuhl, 1820)	Central Africa	Size: 16–18 cm (6–7 in) long, plus 16–17 cm (6–7 in) tail Habitat: Forest, savanna, shrubland, and rocky areas Diet: Seeds, nuts, and fruit, as well as insects and eggs	LC Unknown
Du Chaillu's rope squirrel	F. duchaillui Sanborn, 1953	Central Africa	Size: 18–21 cm (7–8 in) long, plus 19–23 cm (7–9 in) tail Habitat: Forest Diet: Seeds, nuts, and fruit, as well as insects and eggs	DD Unknown
Fire-footed rope squirrel	F. pyrropus (F. Cuvier, 1833) Nine subspecies: F. p. akka; F. p. leonis; F. p. leucostigma; F. p. mandingo; F. p. nigrensis; F. p. niveatus; F. p. pembertoni; F. p. pyrropus; F. p. talboti	Central and western Africa	Size: 19–20 cm (7–8 in) long, plus 14–16 cm (6 in) tail Habitat: Forest and savanna Diet: Seeds, nuts, and fruit, as well as insects and eggs	LC Unknown
Kintampo rope squirrel	F. substriatus De Winton, 1899	Western Africa	Size: 16–17 cm (6–7 in) long, plus about 16 cm (6 in) tail Habitat: Forest and savanna Diet: Seeds, nuts, and fruit, as well as insects and eggs	DD Unknown
Lady Burton's rope squirrel	F. isabella (Gray, 1862) Two subspecies: F. i. dubosti; F. i. isabella	Central Africa	Size: 16–17 cm (6–7 in) long, plus 14–17 cm (6–7 in) tail Habitat: Forest Diet: Seeds, nuts, and fruit, as well as insects and eggs	LC Unknown
Lunda rope squirrel	F. bayonii (Bocage, 1890)	Central Africa	Size: 18–25 cm (7–10 in) long, plus 19–20 cm (7–8 in) tail Habitat: Savanna Diet: Seeds, nuts, and fruit, as well as insects and eggs	DD Unknown
Red-cheeked rope squirrel	F. leucogenys (Waterhouse, 1842) Three subspecies: F. l. auriculatus; F. l. leucogenys; F. l. oliviae	Central and western Africa	Size: 20–21 cm (8 in) long, plus 14–15 cm (6 in) tail Habitat: Forest Diet: Seeds, nuts, and fruit, as well as insects and eggs	LC Unknown
Ribboned rope squirrel	F. lemniscatus (LeConte, 1857) Two subspecies: F. l. lemniscatus; F. l. mayumbicus	Central Africa	Size: 16–18 cm (6–7 in) long, plus 13–14 cm (5–6 in) tail Habitat: Forest Diet: Seeds, nuts, and fruit, as well as insects and eggs	LC Unknown
Thomas's rope squirrel	F. anerythrus (Thomas, 1890) Four subspecies: F. a. anerythrus; F. a. bandarum; F. a. mystax; F. a. raptorum	Central and western Africa	Size: 17–18 cm (7 in) long, plus 16–17 cm (6–7 in) tail Habitat: Forest and savanna Diet: Seeds, nuts, and fruit, as well as insects and eggs	LC Unknown

Genus Heliosciurus – Trouessart, 1880 – six species
Common name	Scientific name and subspecies	Range	Size and ecology	IUCN status and estimated population
Gambian sun squirrel	H. gambianus (Ogilby, 1835) Sixteen subspecies: H. g. abassensis; H. g. bongensis; H. g. canaster; H. g. dysoni; H. g. elegans; H. g. gambianus; H. g. hoogstraali; H. g. kaffensis; H. g. lateris; H. g. limbatus; H. g. loandicus; H. g. madogae; H. g. multicolor; H. g. omensis; H. g. rhodesiae; H. g. senescens	Sub-Saharan Africa	Size: 20–22 cm (8–9 in) long, plus 23–24 cm (9 in) tail Habitat: Savanna and forest Diet: Seeds, nuts, fruit, insects, and eggs	LC Unknown
Mutable sun squirrel	H. mutabilis (Peters, 1852) Five subspecies: H. m. beirae; H. m. chirindensis; H. m. mutabilis; H. m. shirensis; H. m. vumbae	Eastern Africa	Size: 22–23 cm (9 in) long, plus 23–27 cm (9–11 in) tail Habitat: Savanna and forest Diet: Seeds, nuts, fruit, insects, and eggs	LC Unknown
Red-legged sun squirrel	H. rufobrachium (Waterhouse, 1842) 22 subspecies: H. r. arrhenii; H. r. aubryi; H. r. benga; H. r. brauni; H. r. caurinus; H. r. coenosus; H. r. emissus; H. r. hardyi; H. r. isabellinus; H. r. keniae; H. r. leakyi; H. r. leonensis; H. r. lualabae; H. r. maculatus; H. r. medjianus; H. r. nyansae; H. r. obfuscatus; H. r. occidentalis; H. r. pasha; H. r. rubricatus; H. r. rufobrachium; H. r. semlikii	Central and western Africa	Size: 22–23 cm (9 in) long, plus 24–25 cm (9–10 in) tail Habitat: Forest and savanna Diet: Seeds, nuts, fruit, insects, and eggs	LC Unknown
Ruwenzori sun squirrel	H. ruwenzorii (Schwann, 1904) Four subspecies: H. r. ituriensis; H. r. ruwenzorii; H. r. schoutedeni; H. r. vulcanius	Central Africa	Size: 21–22 cm (8–9 in) long, plus about 25 cm (10 in) tail Habitat: Forest Diet: Seeds, nuts, fruit, insects, and eggs	LC Unknown
Small sun squirrel	H. punctatus (Temminck, 1853) Two subspecies: H. p. punctatus; H. p. savannius	Western Africa	Size: 18–19 cm (7 in) long, plus 20–21 cm (8 in) tail Habitat: Forest Diet: Seeds, nuts, fruit, insects, and eggs	DD Unknown
Zanj sun squirrel	H. undulatus (True, 1892)	Eastern Africa	Size: 23–24 cm (9 in) long, plus 26–27 cm (10–11 in) tail Habitat: Forest Diet: Seeds, nuts, fruit, insects, and eggs	DD Unknown

Genus Ictidomys – Allen, 1877 – two species
Common name	Scientific name and subspecies	Range	Size and ecology	IUCN status and estimated population
Mexican ground squirrel	I. mexicanus (Erxleben, 1777)	Mexico and southern United States	Size: 32–38 cm (13–15 in) long, plus 12–17 cm (5–7 in) tail Habitat: Grassland and shrubland Diet: Seeds, nuts, grains, roots, bulbs, fungi, vegetation, and insects, as well as small vertebrates and eggs	LC Unknown
Thirteen-lined ground squirrel	I. tridecemlineatus (Mitchill, 1821)	United States and Canada	Size: 17–31 cm (7–12 in) long, plus 6–14 cm (2–6 in) tail Habitat: Shrubland, grassland, and coastal marine Diet: Seeds, nuts, grains, roots, bulbs, fungi, vegetation, and insects, as well as small vertebrates and eggs	LC Unknown

Genus Marmota – Blumenbach, 1779 – fourteen species
Common name	Scientific name and subspecies	Range	Size and ecology	IUCN status and estimated population
Alaska marmot	M. broweri Hall & Gilmore, 1934	Northern Alaska	Size: 54–65 cm (21–26 in) long, plus 13–18 cm (5–7 in) tail Habitat: Grassland and rocky areas Diet: Grass and forbs, as well as fruit, grains, legumes, and insects	LC Unknown
Alpine marmot	M. marmota (Linnaeus, 1758) Two subspecies: M. m. latirostris (Tatra marmot); M. m. marmota	Europe	Size: 50–60 cm (20–24 in) long, plus 14–17 cm (6–7 in) tail Habitat: Grassland and rocky areas Diet: Grass and forbs, as well as fruit, grains, legumes, and insects	LC Unknown
Black-capped marmot	M. camtschatica (Pallas, 1811) Three subspecies: M. c. bungei; M. c. camtschatica; M. c. doppelmayri	Eastern Russia	Size: 46–53 cm (18–21 in) long, plus about 17 cm (7 in) tail Habitat: Grassland Diet: Grass and forbs, as well as fruit, grains, legumes, and insects	LC Unknown
Bobak marmot	M. bobak (P. L. S. Müller, 1776) Two subspecies: M. b. bobak; M. b. tschaganensis	Western Asia and eastern Europe	Size: 49–57 cm (19–22 in) long, plus 10–13 cm (4–5 in) tail Habitat: Grassland Diet: Grass and forbs, as well as fruit, grains, legumes, and insects	LC Unknown
Gray marmot	M. baibacina Kaschtschenko, 1899 Three subspecies: M. b. baibacina; M. b. centralis; M. b. kastschenkoi	Central Asia	Size: 46–65 cm (18–26 in) long, plus 13–16 cm (5–6 in) tail Habitat: Other and grassland Diet: Grass and forbs, as well as fruit, grains, legumes, and insects	LC Unknown
Groundhog	M. monax (Linnaeus, 1758) Four subspecies: M. m. canadensis; M. m. ignava; M. m. monax; M. m. rufescens	United States and Canada	Size: 42–66 cm (17–26 in) long, plus 10–16 cm (4–6 in) tail Habitat: Forest and grassland Diet: Grass and forbs, as well as fruit, grains, legumes, and insects	LC Unknown
Himalayan marmot	M. himalayana (Hodgson, 1841) Two subspecies: M. h. himalayana; M. h. robusta	Nepal and western China	Size: 46–65 cm (18–26 in) long, plus 12–15 cm (5–6 in) tail Habitat: Shrubland, grassland, rocky areas, and desert Diet: Grass and forbs, as well as fruit, grains, legumes, and insects	LC Unknown
Hoary marmot	M. caligata (Eschscholtz, 1829) Three subspecies: M. c. caligata; M. c. cascadensis; M. c. okanagana	Western United States and western Canada	Size: 45–60 cm (18–24 in) long, plus 17–25 cm (7–10 in) tail Habitat: Rocky areas and grassland Diet: Grass and forbs, as well as fruit, grains, legumes, and insects	LC Unknown
Long-tailed marmot	M. caudata (Geoffroy, 1844) Three subspecies: M. c. aurea; M. c. caudata; M. c. dichrous	Central Asia	Size: About 50 cm (20 in) long, plus about 18 cm (7 in) tail Habitat: Shrubland, grassland, and rocky areas Diet: Grass and forbs, as well as fruit, grains, legumes, and insects	LC Unknown
Menzbier's marmot	M. menzbieri (Kashkarov, 1925) Two subspecies: M. m. menzbieri; M. m. zachidovi	Central Asia	Size: About 49 cm (19 in) long, plus about 12 cm (5 in) tail Habitat: Forest Diet: Grass and forbs, as well as fruit, grains, legumes, and insects	VU Unknown
Olympic marmot	M. olympus (Merriam, 1898)	Northwestern United States	Size: 67–75 cm (26–30 in) long, plus 18–24 cm (7–9 in) tail Habitat: Forest and grassland Diet: Grass and forbs, as well as fruit, grains, legumes, and insects	LC 2,000–4,000
Tarbagan marmot	M. sibirica (Radde, 1862) Two subspecies: M. s. caliginosus; M. s. sibirica	Central Asia	Size: 36–49 cm (14–19 in) long, plus 11–12 cm (4–5 in) tail Habitat: Shrubland, grassland, and other Diet: Grass and forbs, as well as fruit, grains, legumes, and insects	EN Unknown
Vancouver Island marmot	M. vancouverensis (Swarth, 1911)	Vancouver Island in western Canada	Size: 66–69 cm (26–27 in) long, plus 19–22 cm (7–9 in) tail Habitat: Forest, grassland, and rocky areas Diet: Grass and forbs, as well as fruit, grains, legumes, and insects	CR 90
Yellow-bellied marmot	M. flaviventris (Audubon & Bachman, 1841) Seven subspecies: M. f. avara; M. f. dacota; M. f. flaviventris; M. f. luteola; M. f. nosophora; M. f. notioros; M. f. obscura	Western United States and western Canada	Size: 47–70 cm (19–28 in) long, plus 13–22 cm (5–9 in) tail Habitat: Forest, grassland, and rocky areas Diet: Grass and forbs, as well as fruit, grains, legumes, and insects	LC Unknown

Genus Myosciurus – Thomas, 1909 – one species
Common name	Scientific name and subspecies	Range	Size and ecology	IUCN status and estimated population
African pygmy squirrel	M. pumilio (LeConte, 1857)	Western Africa	Size: 7–8 cm (3 in) long, plus 5–6 cm (2 in) tail Habitat: Forest Diet: Fruit, bark, and insects	LC Unknown

Genus Neotamias – Howell, 1929 – 23 species
Common name	Scientific name and subspecies	Range	Size and ecology	IUCN status and estimated population
Allen's chipmunk	N. senex (Allen, 1890)	Western United States	Size: 14–15 cm (6 in) long, plus 10–11 cm (4 in) tail Habitat: Shrubland and forest Diet: Fruit and seeds, as well as flowers, fungi, insects, and eggs	LC Unknown
Alpine chipmunk	N. alpinus (Merriam, 1893)	Western United States	Size: 10–11 cm (4 in) long, plus 6–8 cm (2–3 in) tail Habitat: Rocky areas and forest Diet: Fruit and seeds, as well as flowers, fungi, insects, and eggs	LC Unknown
Buller's chipmunk	N. bulleri (Allen, 1889)	Mexico	Size: 13–14 cm (5–6 in) long, plus 8–11 cm (3–4 in) tail Habitat: Shrubland and forest Diet: Fruit and seeds, as well as flowers, fungi, insects, and eggs	VU Unknown
California chipmunk	N. obscurus (Allen, 1890)	Western United States and western Mexico	Size: 12–13 cm (5 in) long, plus 10–12 cm (4–5 in) tail Habitat: Desert and shrubland Diet: Fruit and seeds, as well as flowers, fungi, insects, and eggs	LC Unknown
Cliff chipmunk	N. dorsalis (Baird, 1855)	Western United States and western Mexico	Size: 12–13 cm (5 in) long, plus 8–11 cm (3–4 in) tail Habitat: Forest and shrubland Diet: Fruit and seeds, as well as flowers, fungi, insects, and eggs	LC Unknown
Colorado chipmunk	N. quadrivittatus (Say, 1823)	Western United States	Size: 12–14 cm (5–6 in) long, plus about 10 cm (4 in) tail Habitat: Rocky areas, shrubland, and forest Diet: Fruit and seeds, as well as flowers, fungi, insects, and eggs	LC Unknown
Durango chipmunk	N. durangae (Allen, 1903)	Mexico	Size: 12–16 cm (5–6 in) long, plus 8–11 cm (3–4 in) tail Habitat: Forest Diet: Fruit and seeds, as well as flowers, fungi, insects, and eggs	LC Unknown
Gray-collared chipmunk	N. cinereicollis (Allen, 1890)	Southwestern United States	Size: 12–14 cm (5–6 in) long, plus 9–11 cm (4 in) tail Habitat: Forest Diet: Fruit and seeds, as well as flowers, fungi, insects, and eggs	LC Unknown
Gray-footed chipmunk	N. canipes (Bailey, 1902)	Southwestern United States	Size: 12–14 cm (5–6 in) long, plus 9–11 cm (4 in) tail Habitat: Forest, shrubland, and rocky areas Diet: Fruit and seeds, as well as flowers, fungi, insects, and eggs	LC Unknown
Hopi chipmunk	N. rufus (Hoffmeister & Ellis, 1979)	Southwestern United States	Size: 12–13 cm (5 in) long, plus 9–10 cm (4 in) tail Habitat: Forest, shrubland, rocky areas, and desert Diet: Fruit and seeds, as well as flowers, fungi, insects, and eggs	LC Unknown
Least chipmunk	N. minimus (Bachman, 1839)	Canada and United States	Size: 10–12 cm (4–5 in) long, plus 8–9 cm (3–4 in) tail Habitat: Forest, shrubland, grassland, and desert Diet: Fruit and seeds, as well as flowers, fungi, insects, and eggs	LC Unknown
Lodgepole chipmunk	N. speciosus (Merriam, 1890)	Western United States	Size: 12–13 cm (5 in) long, plus 8–10 cm (3–4 in) tail Habitat: Forest and grassland Diet: Fruit and seeds, as well as flowers, fungi, insects, and eggs	LC Unknown
Long-eared chipmunk	N. quadrimaculatus (J. E. Gray, 1867)	Western United States	Size: 13–14 cm (5–6 in) long, plus 9–11 cm (4 in) tail Habitat: Forest and shrubland Diet: Fruit and seeds, as well as flowers, fungi, insects, and eggs	LC Unknown
Merriam's chipmunk	N. merriami (Allen, 1889)	Western United States and western Mexico	Size: 13–14 cm (5–6 in) long, plus 10–12 cm (4–5 in) tail Habitat: Forest and shrubland Diet: Fruit and seeds, as well as flowers, fungi, insects, and eggs	LC Unknown
Palmer's chipmunk	N. palmeri (Merriam, 1897)	Western United States	Size: 12–13 cm (5 in) long, plus 8–10 cm (3–4 in) tail Habitat: Forest and rocky areas Diet: Fruit and seeds, as well as flowers, fungi, insects, and eggs	EN Unknown
Panamint chipmunk	N. panamintinus (Merriam, 1893)	Western United States	Size: 10–11 cm (4–4 in) long, plus 8–10 cm (3–4 in) tail Habitat: Forest and rocky areas Diet: Fruit and seeds, as well as flowers, fungi, insects, and eggs	LC Unknown
Red-tailed chipmunk	N. ruficaudus (Howell, 1920)	Western United States and western Canada	Size: 12–13 cm (5 in) long, plus 9–11 cm (4 in) tail Habitat: Forest Diet: Fruit and seeds, as well as flowers, fungi, insects, and eggs	LC Unknown
Siskiyou chipmunk	N. siskiyou (Howell, 1922)	Western United States	Size: 14–15 cm (6 in) long, plus 10–11 cm (4 in) tail Habitat: Forest Diet: Fruit and seeds, as well as flowers, fungi, insects, and eggs	LC Unknown
Sonoma chipmunk	N. sonomae (Grinnell, 1915)	Western United States	Size: 13–14 cm (5–6 in) long, plus 10–12 cm (4–5 in) tail Habitat: Forest and shrubland Diet: Fruit and seeds, as well as flowers, fungi, insects, and eggs	LC Unknown
Townsend's chipmunk	N. townsendii (Bachman, 1839)	Western United States and western Canada	Size: 13–15 cm (5–6 in) long, plus 11–12 cm (4–5 in) tail Habitat: Forest Diet: Fruit and seeds, as well as flowers, fungi, insects, and eggs	LC Unknown
Uinta chipmunk	N. umbrinus (Allen, 1890)	Western United States	Size: 12–13 cm (5 in) long, plus 8–12 cm (3–5 in) tail Habitat: Shrubland and forest Diet: Fruit and seeds, as well as flowers, fungi, insects, and eggs	LC Unknown
Yellow-cheeked chipmunk	N. ochrogenys (Merriam, 1897)	Western United States	Size: 14–16 cm (6 in) long, plus 10–12 cm (4–5 in) tail Habitat: Forest Diet: Fruit and seeds, as well as flowers, fungi, insects, and eggs	LC Unknown
Yellow-pine chipmunk	N. amoenus (Allen, 1890)	Western United States and western Canada	Size: 11–13 cm (4–5 in) long, plus 8–10 cm (3–4 in) tail Habitat: Shrubland, grassland, and rocky areas Diet: Fruit and seeds, as well as flowers, fungi, insects, and eggs	LC Unknown

Genus Notocitellus – Howell, 1938 – two species
Common name	Scientific name and subspecies	Range	Size and ecology	IUCN status and estimated population
Ring-tailed ground squirrel	N. annulatus (Audubon & Bachman, 1842)	Central Mexico	Size: About 22 cm (9 in) long, plus about 21 cm (8 in) tail Habitat: Forest Diet: Seeds, nuts, grains, roots, bulbs, fungi, vegetation, and insects, as well as small vertebrates and eggs	LC Unknown
Tropical ground squirrel	N. adocetus (Merriam, 1903)	Mexico	Size: 16–18 cm (6–7 in) long, plus 13–15 cm (5–6 in) tail Habitat: Rocky areas, shrubland, and forest Diet: Seeds, nuts, grains, roots, bulbs, fungi, vegetation, and insects, as well as small vertebrates and eggs	LC Unknown

Genus Otospermophilus – Brandt, 1844 – two species
Common name	Scientific name and subspecies	Range	Size and ecology	IUCN status and estimated population
California ground squirrel	O. beecheyi (Richardson, 1829)	Western United States and western Mexico	Size: About 28 cm (11 in) long, plus about 13 cm (5 in) tail Habitat: Shrubland and grassland Diet: Seeds, nuts, grains, roots, bulbs, fungi, vegetation, and insects, as well as small vertebrates and eggs	LC Unknown
Rock squirrel	O. variegatus (Erxleben, 1777)	Mexico and southwestern United States	Size: 43–54 cm (17–21 in) long, plus 17–26 cm (7–10 in) tail Habitat: Shrubland and rocky areas Diet: Seeds, nuts, grains, roots, bulbs, fungi, vegetation, and insects, as well as small vertebrates and eggs	LC Unknown

Genus Paraxerus – Forsyth Major, 1893 – eleven species
Common name	Scientific name and subspecies	Range	Size and ecology	IUCN status and estimated population
Alexander's bush squirrel	P. alexandri (Thomas & Wroughton, 1907)	Central Africa	Size: 13–15 cm (5–6 in) long, plus 10–12 cm (4–5 in) tail Habitat: Forest Diet: Seeds and fruit, as well as roots and eggs	LC Unknown
Black and red bush squirrel	P. lucifer (Thomas, 1897)	Southeastern Africa	Size: About 23 cm (9 in) long, plus 19–20 cm (7–8 in) tail Habitat: Forest Diet: Seeds and fruit, as well as roots and eggs	DD Unknown
Boehm's bush squirrel	P. boehmi (Reichenow, 1886) Four subspecies: P. b. antoniae; P. b. boehmi; P. b. emini; P. b. gazellae	Central Africa	Size: About 13 cm (5 in) long, plus 13–15 cm (5–6 in) tail Habitat: Savanna and forest Diet: Seeds and fruit, as well as roots and eggs	LC Unknown
Cooper's mountain squirrel	P. cooperi (Hayman, 1950)	Western Africa	Size: 19–20 cm (7–8 in) long, plus about 19 cm (7 in) tail Habitat: Forest Diet: Seeds and fruit, as well as roots and eggs	DD Unknown
Green bush squirrel	P. poensis (Smith, 1830)	Central and western Africa	Size: 15–16 cm (6 in) long, plus 15–17 cm (6–7 in) tail Habitat: Forest and shrubland Diet: Seeds and fruit, as well as roots and eggs	LC Unknown
Ochre bush squirrel	P. ochraceus (Huet, 1880) Eight subspecies: P. o. affinis; P. o. animosus; P. o. aruscensis; P. o. electus; P. o. ganana; P. o. jacksoni; P. o. kahari; P. o. ochraceus	Eastern Africa	Size: 16–17 cm (6–7 in) long, plus 16–17 cm (6–7 in) tail Habitat: Forest, savanna, and shrubland Diet: Seeds and fruit, as well as roots and eggs	LC Unknown
Red bush squirrel	P. palliatus (Peters, 1852) Seven subspecies: P. p. bridgemani; P. p. frerei; P. p. ornatus; P. p. palliatus; P. p. sponsus; P. p. swynnertoni; P. p. tanae	Eastern Africa	Size: About 21 cm (8 in) long, plus 20–21 cm (8 in) tail Habitat: Forest and shrubland Diet: Seeds and fruit, as well as roots and eggs	LC Unknown
Smith's bush squirrel	P. cepapi (Smith, 1836) Ten subspecies: P. c. bororensis; P. c. carpi; P. c. cepapi; P. c. cepapoides; P. c. chobiensis; P. c. phalaena; P. c. quotus; P. c. sindi; P. c. soccatus; P. c. yulei	Southern Africa	Size: About 23 cm (9 in) long, plus about 18 cm (7 in) tail Habitat: Shrubland and savanna Diet: Seeds and fruit, as well as roots and eggs	LC Unknown
Striped bush squirrel	P. flavovittis (Peters, 1852) Four subspecies: P. f. exgeanus; P. f. flavovittis; P. f. ibeanus; P. f. mossambicus	Eastern Africa	Size: 16–18 cm (6–7 in) long, plus 15–17 cm (6–7 in) tail Habitat: Savanna Diet: Seeds and fruit, as well as roots and eggs	LC Unknown
Swynnerton's bush squirrel	P. vexillarius (Kershaw, 1923) Two subspecies: P. v. byatti; P. v. vexillarius	Tanzania	Size: 21–23 cm (8–9 in) long, plus 18–19 cm (7 in) tail Habitat: Forest Diet: Seeds and fruit, as well as roots and eggs	LC Unknown
Vincent's bush squirrel	P. vincenti Hayman, 1950	Mozambique	Size: 21–22 cm (8–9 in) long, plus about 21 cm (8 in) tail Habitat: Forest Diet: Seeds and fruit, as well as roots and eggs	EN Unknown

Genus Poliocitellus – Howell, 1938 – one species
Common name	Scientific name and subspecies	Range	Size and ecology	IUCN status and estimated population
Franklin's ground squirrel	P. franklinii (Sabine, 1822)	Central United States and southern Canada	Size: 23–24 cm (9 in) long, plus about 13 cm (5 in) tail Habitat: Savanna, grassland, and inland wetlands Diet: Seeds, nuts, grains, roots, bulbs, fungi, vegetation, and insects, as well as small vertebrates and eggs	LC Unknown

Genus Protoxerus – Forsyth Major, 1893 – two species
Common name	Scientific name and subspecies	Range	Size and ecology	IUCN status and estimated population
Forest giant squirrel	P. stangeri (Waterhouse, 1842) Twelve subspecies: P. s. bea; P. s. centricola; P. s. cooperi; P. s. eborivorus; P. s. kabobo; P. s. kwango; P. s. loandae; P. s. nigeriae; P. s. personatus; P. s. signatus; P. s. stangeri; P. s. temminckii	Western and central Africa	Size: 28–30 cm (11–12 in) long, plus 30–31 cm (12 in) tail Habitat: Forest Diet: Seeds, nuts, and fruit	LC Unknown
Slender-tailed squirrel	P. aubinnii (Gray, 1873) Two subspecies: P. a. aubinnii; P. a. salae	Western Africa	Size: 24–25 cm (9–10 in) long, plus about 30 cm (12 in) tail Habitat: Forest Diet: Seeds, nuts, and fruit	NT Unknown

Genus Sciurotamias – Miller, 1901 – two species
Common name	Scientific name and subspecies	Range	Size and ecology	IUCN status and estimated population
Forrest's rock squirrel	S. forresti (Thomas, 1922)	Southern China	Size: About 22 cm (9 in) long, plus about 16 cm (6 in) tail Habitat: Rocky areas and shrubland Diet: Fruit and seeds	LC Unknown
Père David's rock squirrel	S. davidianus (H. Milne-Edwards, 1867) Two subspecies: S. d. consobrinus; S. d. davidianus	China	Size: 20–21 cm (8 in) long, plus 14–15 cm (6 in) tail Habitat: Rocky areas Diet: Fruit and seeds	LC Unknown

Genus Spermophilopsis – Blasius, 1884 – one species
Common name	Scientific name and subspecies	Range	Size and ecology	IUCN status and estimated population
Long-clawed ground squirrel	S. leptodactylus (Lichtenstein, 1823) Three subspecies: S. l. bactrianus; S. l. heptopotamicus; S. l. leptodactylus	Central Asia	Size: 23–27 cm (9–11 in) long, plus 2–9 cm (1–4 in) tail Habitat: Desert, grassland, and shrubland Diet: Fruit, seeds, vegetation, and insects	LC Unknown

Genus Spermophilus – F. Cuvier, 1825 – fifteen species
Common name	Scientific name and subspecies	Range	Size and ecology	IUCN status and estimated population
Alashan ground squirrel	S. alaschanicus (Büchner, 1888)	China and Mongolia	Size: About 22 cm (9 in) long, plus about 8 cm (3 in) tail Habitat: Grassland, rocky areas, and desert Diet: Seeds, nuts, grains, roots, bulbs, fungi, vegetation, and insects, as well as small vertebrates and eggs	LC Unknown
Asia Minor ground squirrel	S. xanthoprymnus (Bennett, 1835)	Western Asia	Size: 14–23 cm (6–9 in) long, plus 3–4 cm (1–2 in) tail Habitat: Grassland Diet: Seeds, nuts, grains, roots, bulbs, fungi, vegetation, and insects, as well as small vertebrates and eggs	NT Unknown
Brandt's ground squirrel	S. brevicauda (Brandt, 1843)	Central Asia	Size: About 28 cm (11 in) long, plus about 5 cm (2 in) tail Habitat: Shrubland and grassland Diet: Seeds, nuts, grains, roots, bulbs, fungi, vegetation, and insects, as well as small vertebrates and eggs	LC Unknown
Caucasian Mountain ground squirrel	S. musicus Ménétries, 1823	Southwestern Russia	Size: 20–24 cm (8–9 in) long, plus 3–5 cm (1–2 in) tail Habitat: Shrubland and grassland Diet: Seeds, nuts, grains, roots, bulbs, fungi, vegetation, and insects, as well as small vertebrates and eggs	LC Unknown
Daurian ground squirrel	S. dauricus Brandt, 1843	Eastern Asia	Size: About 19 cm (7 in) long, plus 5–7 cm (2–3 in) tail Habitat: Grassland Diet: Seeds, nuts, grains, roots, bulbs, fungi, vegetation, and insects, as well as small vertebrates and eggs	LC Unknown
European ground squirrel	S. citellus (Linnaeus, 1766)	Eastern Europe	Size: 17–23 cm (7–9 in) long, plus 3–9 cm (1–4 in) tail Habitat: Grassland Diet: Seeds, nuts, grains, roots, bulbs, fungi, vegetation, and insects, as well as small vertebrates and eggs	EN Unknown
Little ground squirrel	S. pygmaeus (Pallas, 1778)	Eastern Europe and western Asia	Size: 17–26 cm (7–10 in) long, plus 2–5 cm (1–2 in) tail Habitat: Grassland Diet: Seeds, nuts, grains, roots, bulbs, fungi, vegetation, and insects, as well as small vertebrates and eggs	LC Unknown
Pallid ground squirrel	S. pallidicauda (Satunin, 1903)	Mongolia	Size: 19–23 cm (7–9 in) long, plus 3–6 cm (1–2 in) tail Habitat: Grassland Diet: Seeds, nuts, grains, roots, bulbs, fungi, vegetation, and insects, as well as small vertebrates and eggs	LC Unknown
Red-cheeked ground squirrel	S. erythrogenys Brandt, 1841	Central Asia	Size: 18–20 cm (7–8 in) long, plus 4–5 cm (2 in) tail Habitat: Shrubland Diet: Seeds, nuts, grains, roots, bulbs, fungi, vegetation, and insects, as well as small vertebrates and eggs	LC Unknown
Relict ground squirrel	S. relictus (Kashkarov, 1923)	Central Asia	Size: 23–27 cm (9–11 in) long, plus 5–8 cm (2–3 in) tail Habitat: Grassland Diet: Seeds, nuts, grains, roots, bulbs, fungi, vegetation, and insects, as well as small vertebrates and eggs	LC Unknown
Russet ground squirrel	S. major (Pallas, 1779)	Central Asia	Size: 25–32 cm (10–13 in) long, plus 7–11 cm (3–4 in) tail Habitat: Grassland Diet: Seeds, nuts, grains, roots, bulbs, fungi, vegetation, and insects, as well as small vertebrates and eggs	NT Unknown
Speckled ground squirrel	S. suslicus (Güldenstädt, 1770)	Eastern Europe and western Asia	Size: 18–26 cm (7–10 in) long, plus 3–6 cm (1–2 in) tail Habitat: Grassland Diet: Seeds, nuts, grains, roots, bulbs, fungi, vegetation, and insects, as well as small vertebrates and eggs	CR Unknown
Taurus ground squirrel	S. taurensis Gündüz, Jaarola, Tez, Yeniyurt, Polly, & Searle, 2007	Turkey	Size: About 20 cm (8 in) long, plus about 6 cm (2 in) tail Habitat: Unknown Diet: Seeds, nuts, grains, roots, bulbs, fungi, vegetation, and insects, as well as small vertebrates and eggs	LC Unknown
Tian Shan ground squirrel	S. nilkaensis Kuznetsov, 1948	Western China	Size: 20–24 cm (8–9 in) long, plus 6–8 cm (2–3 in) tail Habitat: Grassland Diet: Seeds, nuts, grains, roots, bulbs, fungi, vegetation, and insects, as well as small vertebrates and eggs	LC Unknown
Yellow ground squirrel	S. fulvus (Lichtenstein, 1823) Three subspecies: S. f. fulvus; S. f. hypoleucos; S. f. oxianus	Central Asia	Size: 22–28 cm (9–11 in) long, plus 7–9 cm (3–4 in) tail Habitat: Grassland and desert Diet: Seeds, nuts, grains, roots, bulbs, fungi, vegetation, and insects, as well as small vertebrates and eggs	LC Unknown

Genus Tamias – Illiger, 1811 – one species
Common name	Scientific name and subspecies	Range	Size and ecology	IUCN status and estimated population
Eastern chipmunk	T. striatus (Linnaeus, 1758)	Eastern United States and eastern Canada	Size: 14–15 cm (6 in) long, plus 8–10 cm (3–4 in) tail Habitat: Shrubland and forest Diet: Nuts, seeds, fruit, and fungi	LC Unknown

Genus Urocitellus – Obolenskij, 1927 – twelve species
Common name	Scientific name and subspecies	Range	Size and ecology	IUCN status and estimated population
Arctic ground squirrel	U. parryii Richardson, 1825	Northern Canada, Alaska, and eastern Russia	Size: 26–27 cm (10–11 in) long, plus 8–11 cm (3–4 in) tail Habitat: Forest and grassland Diet: Seeds, nuts, grains, roots, bulbs, fungi, vegetation, and insects, as well as small vertebrates and eggs	LC Unknown
Belding's ground squirrel	U. beldingi (Merriam, 1888)	Western United States	Size: 20–21 cm (8 in) long, plus 6–7 cm (2–3 in) tail Habitat: Grassland and shrubland Diet: Seeds, nuts, grains, roots, bulbs, fungi, vegetation, and insects, as well as small vertebrates and eggs	LC Unknown
Columbian ground squirrel	U. columbianus (Ord, 1815)	Western United States and western Canada	Size: 25–26 cm (10 in) long, plus 8–11 cm (3–4 in) tail Habitat: Forest, shrubland, and grassland Diet: Seeds, nuts, grains, roots, bulbs, fungi, vegetation, and insects, as well as small vertebrates and eggs	LC Unknown
Long-tailed ground squirrel	U. undulatus Pallas, 1778	Central and eastern Asia	Size: 21–31 cm (8–12 in) long, plus 10–14 cm (4–6 in) tail Habitat: Grassland and desert Diet: Seeds, nuts, grains, roots, bulbs, fungi, vegetation, and insects, as well as small vertebrates and eggs	LC Unknown
Merriam's ground squirrel	U. canus (Merriam, 1898)	Western United States	Size: 15–16 cm (6 in) long, plus 3–5 cm (1–2 in) tail Habitat: Shrubland, grassland, and desert Diet: Seeds, nuts, grains, roots, bulbs, fungi, vegetation, and insects, as well as small vertebrates and eggs	LC Unknown
Northern Idaho ground squirrel	U. brunneus (Howell, 1928)	Western United States	Size: 17–18 cm (7 in) long, plus about 6 cm (2 in) tail Habitat: Shrubland and grassland Diet: Seeds, nuts, grains, roots, bulbs, fungi, vegetation, and insects, as well as small vertebrates and eggs	EN 1,000
Piute ground squirrel	U. mollis (Kennicott, 1863)	Western United States	Size: 20–23 cm (8–9 in) long, plus 4–7 cm (2–3 in) tail Habitat: Shrubland, grassland, and desert Diet: Seeds, nuts, grains, roots, bulbs, fungi, vegetation, and insects, as well as small vertebrates and eggs	LC Unknown
Richardson's ground squirrel	U. richardsonii (Sabine, 1822)	Northern United States and southern Canada	Size: 26–34 cm (10–13 in) long, plus 5–9 cm (2–4 in) tail Habitat: Grassland Diet: Seeds, nuts, grains, roots, bulbs, fungi, vegetation, and insects, as well as small vertebrates and eggs	LC Unknown
Townsend's ground squirrel	U. townsendii (Bachman, 1839)	Northwestern United States	Size: 20–23 cm (8–9 in) long, plus 3–6 cm (1–2 in) tail Habitat: Shrubland and desert Diet: Seeds, nuts, grains, roots, bulbs, fungi, vegetation, and insects, as well as small vertebrates and eggs	VU Unknown
Uinta ground squirrel	U. armatus (Kennicott, 1863)	Western United States	Size: About 22 cm (9 in) long, plus 6–8 cm (2–3 in) tail Habitat: Shrubland and grassland Diet: Seeds, nuts, grains, roots, bulbs, fungi, vegetation, and insects, as well as small vertebrates and eggs	LC Unknown
Washington ground squirrel	U. washingtoni (Howell, 1938)	Northwestern United States	Size: 18–24 cm (7–9 in) long, plus 3–7 cm (1–3 in) tail Habitat: Shrubland and grassland Diet: Seeds, nuts, grains, roots, bulbs, fungi, vegetation, and insects, as well as small vertebrates and eggs	NT Unknown
Wyoming ground squirrel	U. elegans (Kennicott, 1863)	Northwestern United States	Size: About 20 cm (8 in) long, plus about 7 cm (3 in) tail Habitat: Grassland and shrubland Diet: Seeds, nuts, grains, roots, bulbs, fungi, vegetation, and insects, as well as small vertebrates and eggs	LC Unknown

Genus Xerospermophilus – Merriam, 1892 – four species
Common name	Scientific name and subspecies	Range	Size and ecology	IUCN status and estimated population
Mohave ground squirrel	X. mohavensis (Merriam, 1889)	Western United States	Size: 21–23 cm (8–9 in) long, plus 5–8 cm (2–3 in) tail Habitat: Desert Diet: Seeds, nuts, grains, roots, bulbs, fungi, vegetation, and insects, as well as small vertebrates and eggs	NT Unknown
Perote ground squirrel	X. perotensis (Merriam, 1893)	Central Mexico	Size: 24–26 cm (9–10 in) long, plus 5–8 cm (2–3 in) tail Habitat: Forest, grassland, and desert Diet: Seeds, nuts, grains, roots, bulbs, fungi, vegetation, and insects, as well as small vertebrates and eggs	EN Unknown
Round-tailed ground squirrel	X. tereticaudus (Baird, 1858)	Southwestern United States and Northwestern Mexico	Size: 20–28 cm (8–11 in) long, plus 6–12 cm (2–5 in) tail Habitat: Desert Diet: Seeds, nuts, grains, roots, bulbs, fungi, vegetation, and insects, as well as small vertebrates and eggs	LC Unknown
Spotted ground squirrel	X. spilosoma (Bennett, 1833)	Mexico and central and western United States	Size: 18–25 cm (7–10 in) long, plus 5–10 cm (2–4 in) tail Habitat: Grassland and desert Diet: Seeds, nuts, grains, roots, bulbs, fungi, vegetation, and insects, as well as small vertebrates and eggs	LC Unknown

Genus Xerus – Hemprich & Ehrenberg, 1833 – four species
Common name	Scientific name and subspecies	Range	Size and ecology	IUCN status and estimated population
African striped ground squirrel	X. erythropus Geoffroy, 1803 Six subspecies: X. e. chadensis; X. e. erythropus; X. e. lacustris; X. e. leucoumbrinus; X. e. limitaneus; X. e. microdon	Sub-Saharan Africa	Size: 22–29 cm (9–11 in) long, plus 18–26 cm (7–10 in) tail Habitat: Forest and savanna Diet: Roots, seeds, fruit, grains, insects, small vertebrates, and eggs	LC Unknown
Cape ground squirrel	X. inauris (Zimmermann, 1780)	Southern Africa	Size: 24–25 cm (9–10 in) long, plus 19–21 cm (7–8 in) tail Habitat: Desert, shrubland, and savanna Diet: Roots, seeds, fruit, grains, insects, small vertebrates, and eggs	LC Unknown
Mountain ground squirrel	X. princeps (Thomas, 1929)	Southern Africa	Size: 22–29 cm (9–11 in) long, plus 21–28 cm (8–11 in) tail Habitat: Savanna and shrubland Diet: Roots, seeds, fruit, grains, insects, small vertebrates, and eggs	LC Unknown
Unstriped ground squirrel	X. rutilus (Cretzschmar, 1828) Eight subspecies: X. r. dabagala; X. r. dorsalis; X. r. intensus; X. r. massaicus; X. r. rufifrons; X. r. rutilus; X. r. saturatus; X. r. stephanicus	Eastern Africa	Size: 23–27 cm (9–11 in) long, plus 18–20 cm (7–8 in) tail Habitat: Savanna and shrubland Diet: Roots, seeds, fruit, grains, insects, small vertebrates, and eggs	LC Unknown

== Sources ==
- Chernasky, Amy; Motis, Anna; Burgin, Connor, eds. (2023). All the Mammals of the World. Lynx Nature Books. ISBN 978-84-16728-66-4.
- Nowak, Ronald M. (1999). Walker's Mammals of the World. Vol. 2 (6th ed.). Johns Hopkins University Press. ISBN 978-0-8018-5789-8.
- Thorington, Jr., Richard W.; Hoffmann, Robert S. (2005). Wilson, Don E.; Reeder, DeeAnn M. (eds.). Mammal Species of the World. Vol. 2 (3rd ed.). Johns Hopkins University Press. ISBN 978-0-8018-8221-0.
