= Secretive dwarf squirrel =

Conservation status
- Data Deficient (IUCN 3.1)

Scientific classification
- Kingdom: Animalia
- Phylum: Chordata
- Class: Mammalia
- Order: Rodentia
- Family: Sciuridae
- Genus: Prosciurillus
- Species: P. abstrusus

Binomial name
- Prosciurillus abstrusus Moore, 1958

Species of rodent

The secretive dwarf squirrel (Prosciurillus abstrusus) is a species of rodent in the family Sciuridae. It is endemic to Sulawesi, Indonesia, where it is found on the Mengkoka Mountains in southeastern Sulawesi. Its natural habitat is montane forest. It is threatened by habitat loss.
