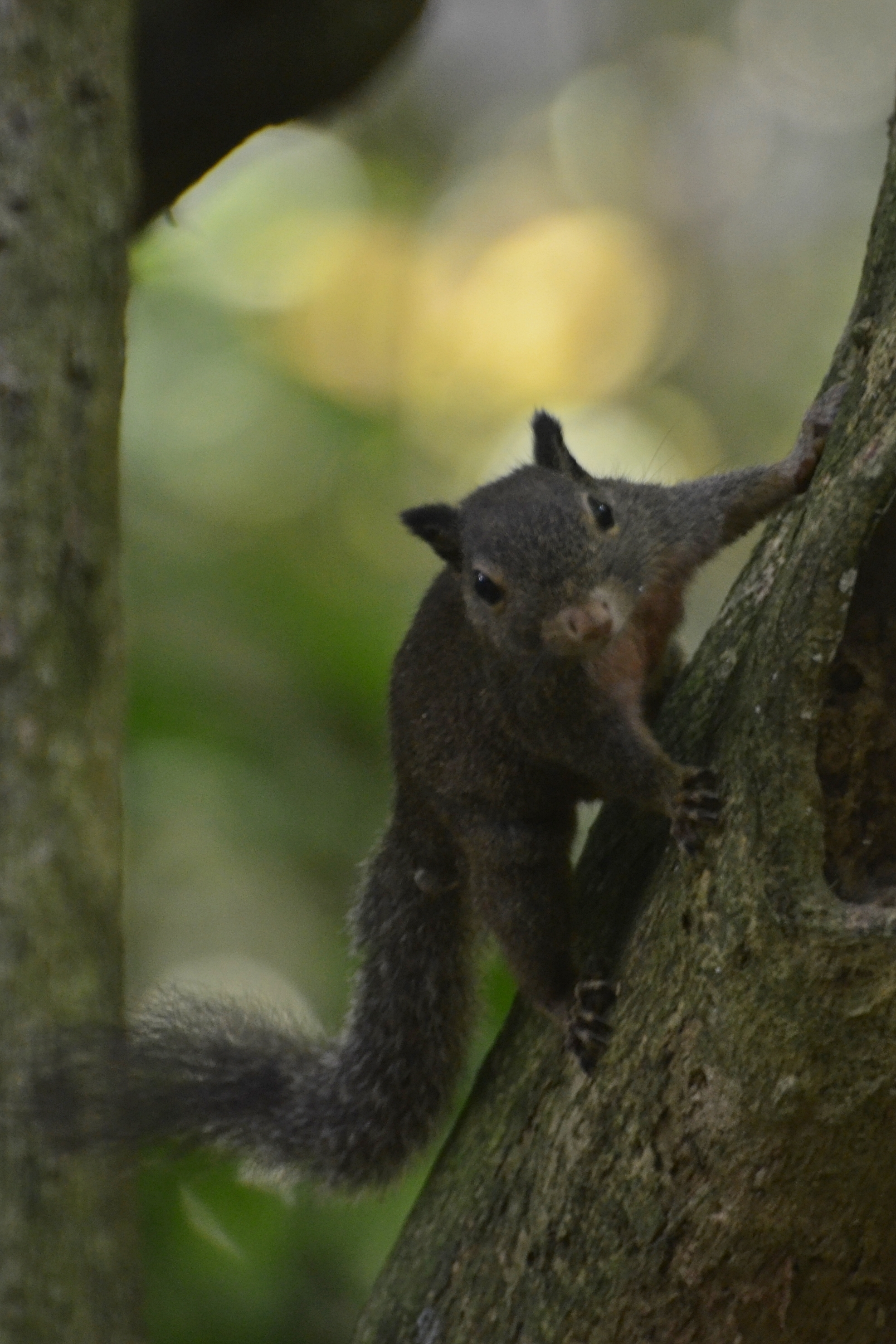
- at Tangkoko Nature Reserve, North Sulawesi

Conservation status
- Least Concern (IUCN 3.1)

Scientific classification
- Kingdom: Animalia
- Phylum: Chordata
- Class: Mammalia
- Order: Rodentia
- Family: Sciuridae
- Genus: Prosciurillus
- Species: P. murinus

Binomial name
- Prosciurillus murinus (S. Müller & Schlegel, 1844)

Subspecies
- P. m. murinus; P. m. griseus; P. m. necopinus

= Celebes dwarf squirrel =

Species of rodent

The Celebes dwarf squirrel (Prosciurillus murinus) is a species of rodent in the family Sciuridae. It is endemic to northeast and central Sulawesi, Indonesia, and is also found on nearby islands including Sangir Island.
