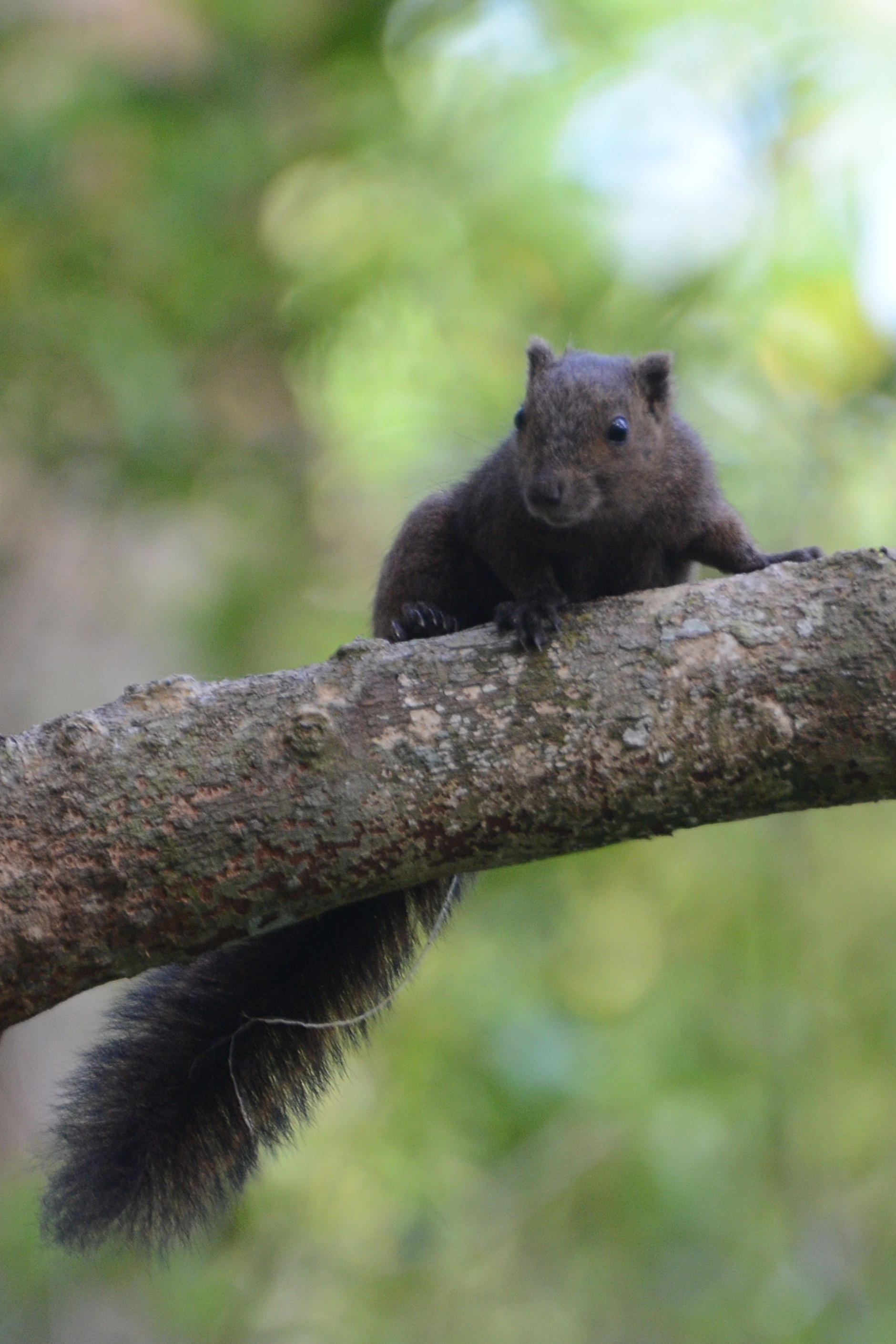
- On Siau Island (Sangir Islands, Indonesia)

Conservation status
- Least Concern (IUCN 3.1)

Scientific classification
- Kingdom: Animalia
- Phylum: Chordata
- Class: Mammalia
- Order: Rodentia
- Family: Sciuridae
- Genus: Prosciurillus
- Species: P. rosenbergii

Binomial name
- Prosciurillus rosenbergii (Jentink, 1879)

= Sanghir squirrel =

Species of rodent

The Sanghir squirrel (Prosciurillus rosenbergii) is a species of rodent in the family Sciuridae. It is endemic to the volcanic Sangir Islands (where they are the only squirrel) in Indonesia, located just north of the equator in the Celebes Sea, between the Indonesian island of Sulawesi and the island of Mindanao in the Philippines.

== Habitat ==
This tropical tree squirrel is the most abundant mammal on heavily cultivated Sangir, where it is found throughout the various ecosystems of the island (including towns and farms), but is especially concentrated in the dwindling old-growth lowland tropical rainforest. Sangir Island has a rich diversity of ecosystems, due to the changing microclimates encountered on the sides of its volcanic peaks, the tallest of which is Mount Awu, at 1,320 metres (4,330 ft). In spite of this environmental diversity, the Sanghir squirrel has adapted itself to each of these climatic zones.
