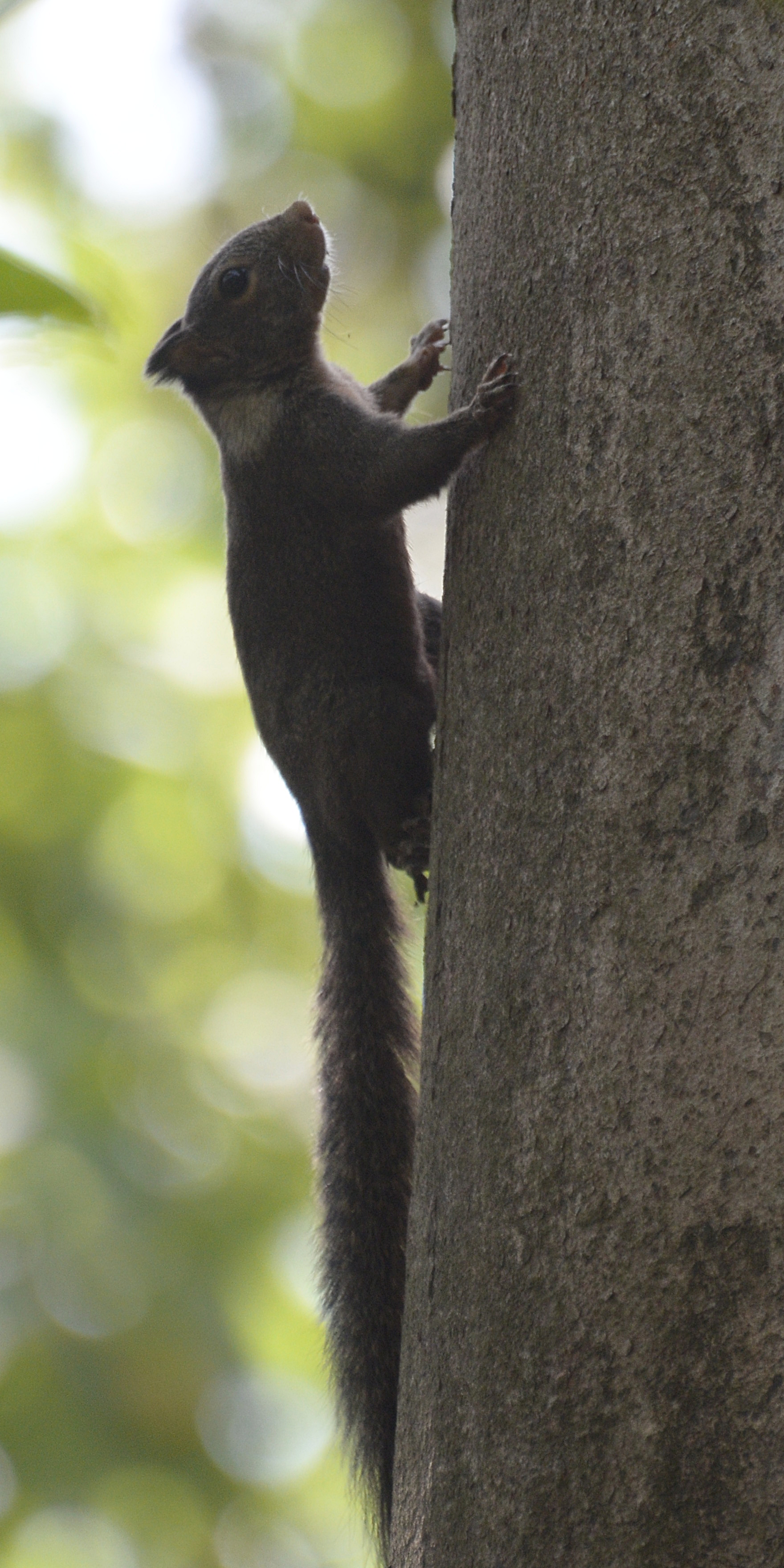
- at Tangkoko Batuangus Nature Reserve, North Sulawesi

Conservation status
- Least Concern (IUCN 3.1)

Scientific classification
- Kingdom: Animalia
- Phylum: Chordata
- Class: Mammalia
- Order: Rodentia
- Family: Sciuridae
- Genus: Prosciurillus
- Species: P. leucomus

Binomial name
- Prosciurillus leucomus (S. Müller & Schlegel, 1844)

Subspecies
- P. l. leucomus; P. l. hirsutes; P. l. occidentalis; P. l. tonkeanus

= Whitish dwarf squirrel =

Species of rodent

The whitish dwarf squirrel (Prosciurillus leucomus) is a species of rodent in the family Sciuridae. It is endemic to Indonesia, where it is found on Sulawesi, Buton Island, Muna Island, Kabeana Island, and adjacent islands to the southeast of Sulawesi.
