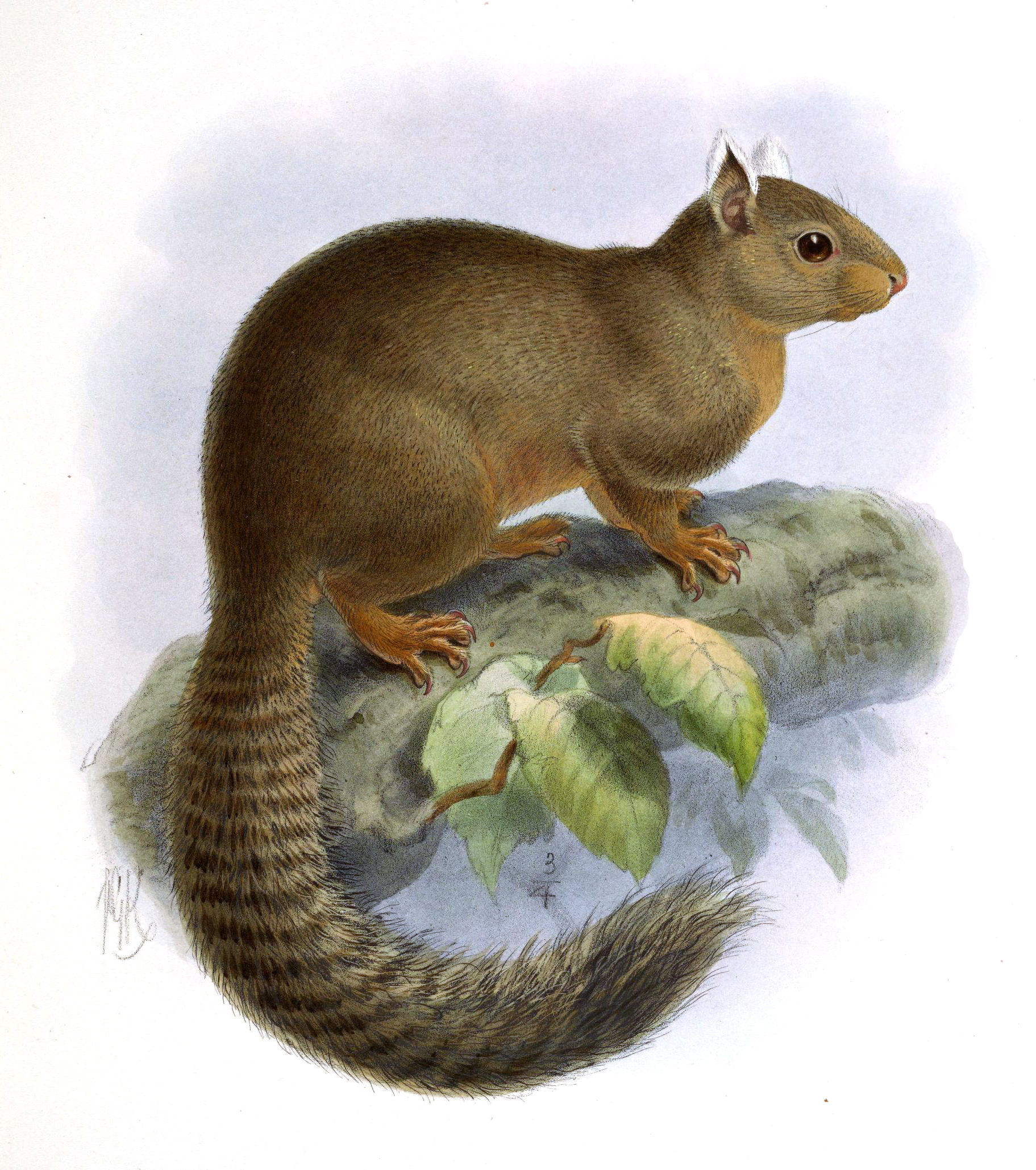
- 1878 illustration by John Gerrard Keulemans

Conservation status
- Near Threatened (IUCN 3.1)

Scientific classification
- Kingdom: Animalia
- Phylum: Chordata
- Class: Mammalia
- Order: Rodentia
- Family: Sciuridae
- Genus: Prosciurillus
- Species: P. alstoni

Binomial name
- Prosciurillus alstoni (J. Anderson, 1879)

= Alston's Sulawesi dwarf squirrel =

Species of rodent

Alston's Sulawesi dwarf squirrel (Prosciurillus alstoni) or Alston's squirrel is a species of rodent in the family Sciuridae. It is endemic to the island of Sulawesi and is thought to be restricted to the lowland forests found on the eastern side of the island. It is threatened by habitat destruction, as tree cover in forests where it is found has been removed throughout the 2000s and 2010s in mining and logging operations.
