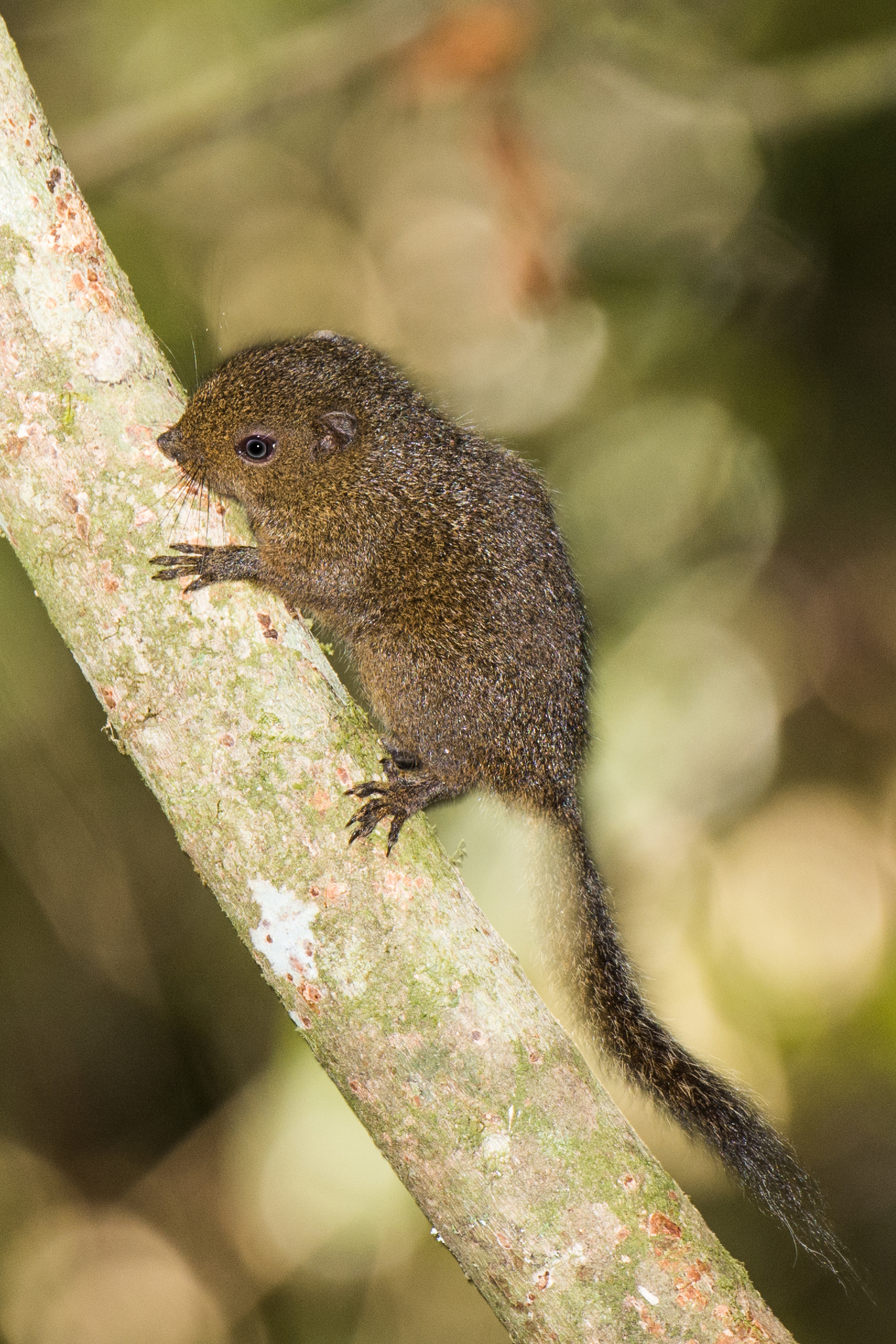
- Lore Lindu National Park, Sulawesi, Indonesia

Conservation status
- Near Threatened (IUCN 3.1)

Scientific classification
- Kingdom: Animalia
- Phylum: Chordata
- Class: Mammalia
- Order: Rodentia
- Family: Sciuridae
- Genus: Prosciurillus
- Species: P. topapuensis

Binomial name
- Prosciurillus topapuensis (Roux, 1910)

= Mount Topapu squirrel =

Species of rodent

The Mount Topapu squirrel (Prosciurillus topapuensis) is a species of rodent in the family Sciuridae. It is endemic to the island of Sulawesi and can be found at elevations between 350 and 2,800 metres (1,150 and 9,190 ft) above sea level. It is threatened by human distrubance and habitat destruction through deforestation.
