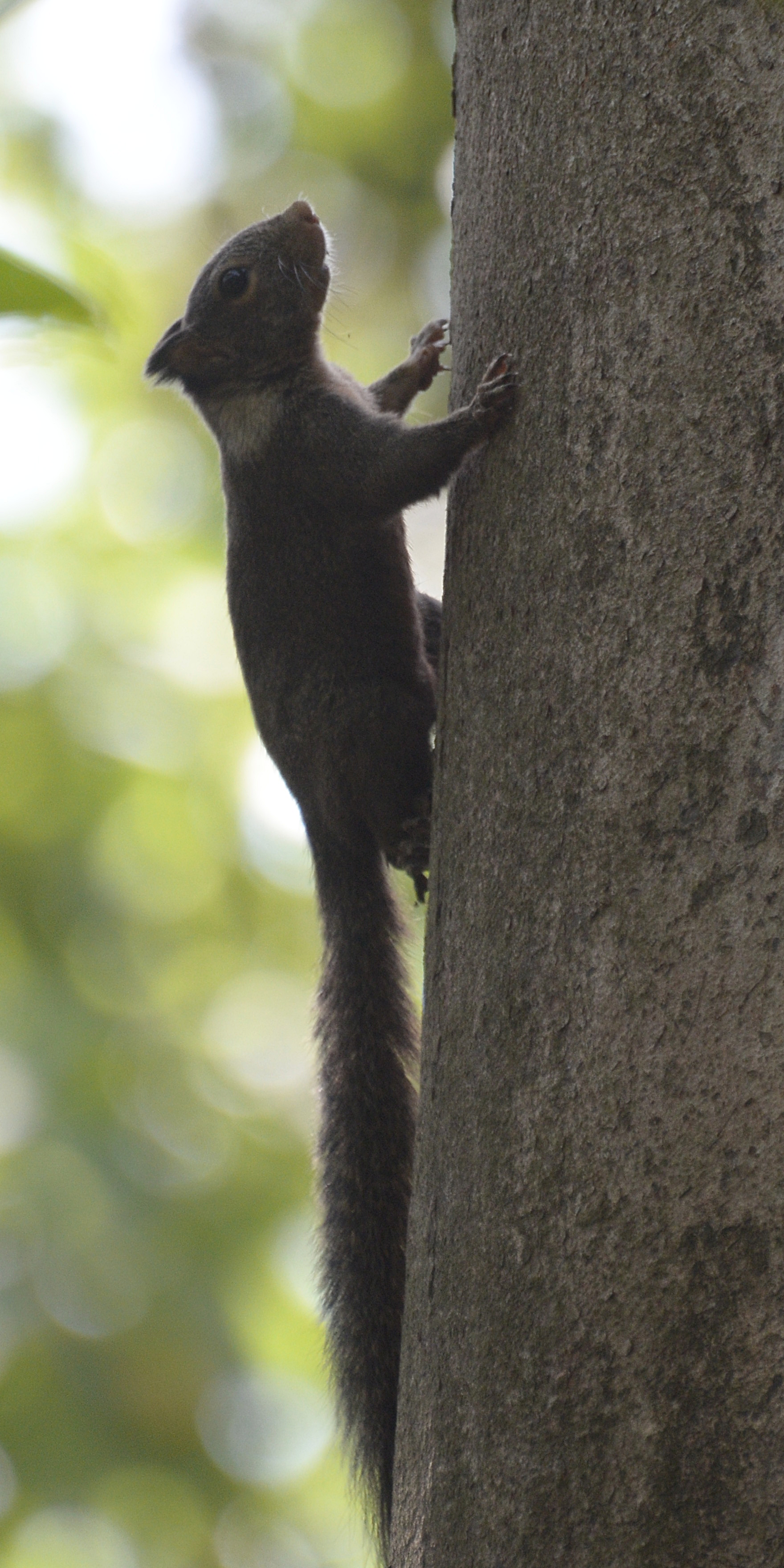
- Whitish dwarf squirrel (Prosciurillus leucomus)

Scientific classification
- Domain: Eukaryota
- Kingdom: Animalia
- Phylum: Chordata
- Class: Mammalia
- Order: Rodentia
- Family: Sciuridae
- Subfamily: Callosciurinae
- Genus: Prosciurillus; Ellerman, 1947

Type species
- Sciurus murinus S. Müller & Schlegel, 1844

Species
- Prosciurillus abstrusus Prosciurillus leucomus Prosciurillus murinus Prosciurillus rosenbergii Prosciurillus weberi

= Prosciurillus =

Genus of rodents

Prosciurillus is a genus of rodents in the family Sciuridae, endemic to Sulawesi and nearby small islands, Indonesia. It contains the following species:

- Secretive dwarf squirrel (Prosciurillus abstrusus)
- Alston's Sulawesi dwarf squirrel (Prosciurillus alstoni)
- Whitish dwarf squirrel (Prosciurillus leucomus)
- Celebes dwarf squirrel (Prosciurillus murinus)
- Sanghir squirrel (Prosciurillus rosenbergii)
- Roux's Sulawesi dwarf squirrel (Prosciurillus topapuensis)
- Weber's dwarf squirrel (Prosciurillus weberi)
