= Weber's dwarf squirrel =

Conservation status
- Vulnerable (IUCN 3.1)

Scientific classification
- Kingdom: Animalia
- Phylum: Chordata
- Class: Mammalia
- Order: Rodentia
- Family: Sciuridae
- Genus: Prosciurillus
- Species: P. weberi

Binomial name
- Prosciurillus weberi (Jentink, 1890)

Species of rodent

Weber's dwarf squirrel (Prosciurillus weberi) is a species of rodent in the family Sciuridae. It is endemic to northern and western Sulawesi, Indonesia. Its natural habitat is subtropical or tropical dry forests.
