= Joseph Curtis Moore =

- Born: 1914
- Died: 1995 (aged 80–81)
- Known for: Taxonomy of rodents and beaked whales
- Scientific career
- Fields: Zoology
- Workplaces: Field Museum of Natural History
- Author abbrev. (zoology): Moore

Joseph Curtis Moore (1914–1995) was an American zoologist specializing in rodents and beaked whales. He worked at the Field Museum of Natural History in Chicago.

== Career ==
Moore is known for describing the beaked whale species Mesoplodon carlhubbsi in his 1963 paper Recognizing certain species of beaked whales of the Pacific Ocean, published in The American Midland Naturalist (vol. 70: 396–428).

== Selected publications ==
- 1965 – A study of the diurnal squirrels, Sciurinae, of the Indian and Indochinese subregions. Fieldiana: Zoology 48: 1–351.
- 1968 – Relationships among the living genera of beaked whales with classifications, diagnoses and keys. Fieldiana: Zoology 53(4): 209–298.
- 1972 – More skull characters of the beaked whale Indopacetus pacificus and comparative measurements of Austral relatives. Publications of the Field Museum of Natural History 62, 1143.

== Abbreviation ==
The abbreviation Moore is used to indicate Joseph Curtis Moore as the authority for zoological species descriptions.
