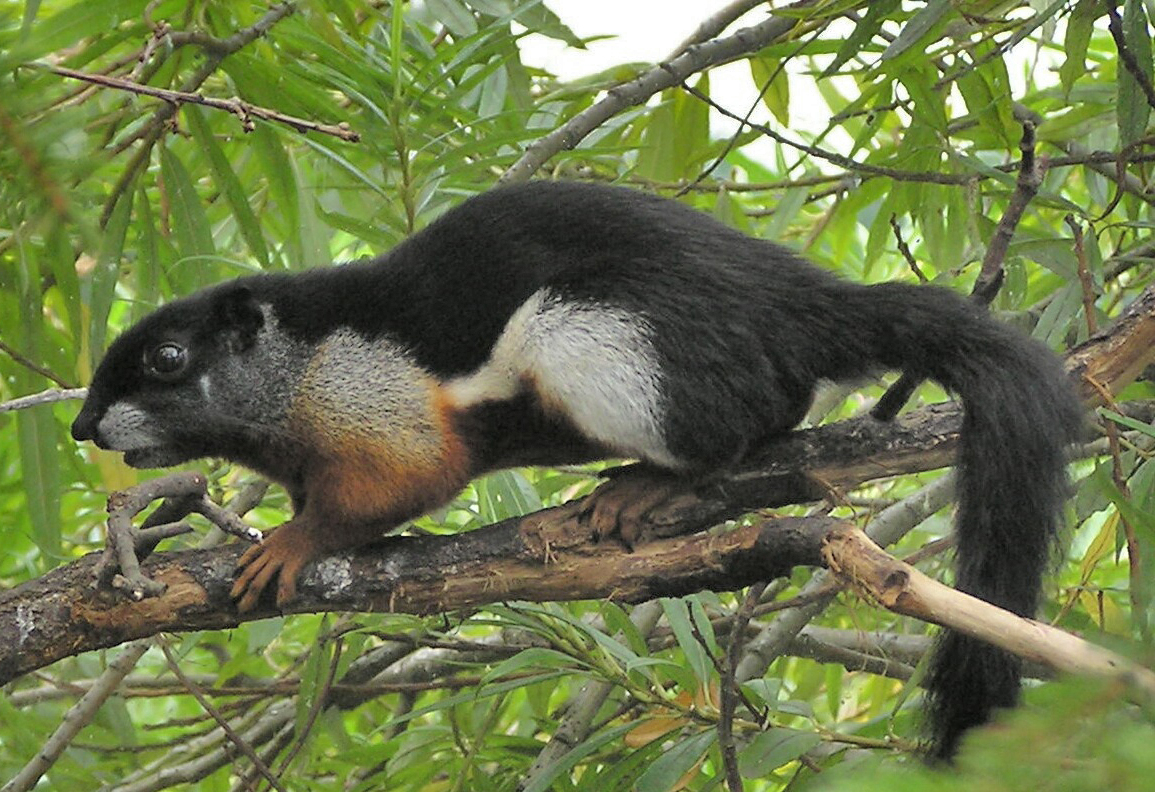
- Callosciurus prevosti

Scientific classification
- Domain: Eukaryota
- Kingdom: Animalia
- Phylum: Chordata
- Class: Mammalia
- Order: Rodentia
- Family: Sciuridae
- Subfamily: Callosciurinae
- Tribe: Callosciurini; Mercer and Roth (2003)

= Callosciurini =

Tribe of mammals

Callosciurini is a tribe of tree squirrels mainly found in southern Asia.

== Species ==
- Genus Callosciurus
  - Callosciurus adamsi (ear-spot squirrel)
  - Callosciurus albescens (Kloss's squirrel)
  - Callosciurus baluensis (Kinabalu squirrel)
  - Callosciurus caniceps (gray-bellied squirrel)
    - Callosciurus caniceps bimaculatus
    - Callosciurus caniceps caniceps
    - Callosciurus caniceps concolor
  - Callosciurus erythraeus (Pallas's squirrel)
    - Callosciurus erythraeus griseimanus
    - Callosciurus erythraeus thaiwanensis
  - Callosciurus finlaysonii (Finlayson's squirrel)
    - Callosciurus finlaysonii frandseni
  - Callosciurus honkhoaiensis (Hon Khoai squirrel)
  - Callosciurus inornatus (Inornate squirrel)
  - Callosciurus melanogaster (Mentawai squirrel)
  - Callosciurus nigrovittatus (black-striped squirrel)
  - Callosciurus notatus (plantain squirrel)
  - Callosciurus orestes (Borneo black-banded squirrel)
  - Callosciurus phayrei (Phayre's squirrel)
  - Callosciurus prevostii (Prevost's squirrel)
    - Callosciurus prevostii pluto
  - Callosciurus pygerythrus (Irrawaddy squirrel)
  - Callosciurus quinquestriatus (Anderson's squirrel)
  - unclassified Callosciurus
    - Callosciurus sp. 1 AG-2015
    - Callosciurus sp. 1 MG-2013
    - Callosciurus sp. 2 AG-2015
    - Callosciurus sp. 2 MG-2013
- Genus Dremomys
  - Dremomys everetti (Bornean mountain ground squirrel)
  - Dremomys gularis (red-throated squirrel)
  - Dremomys lokriah (orange-bellied Himalayan squirrel)
  - Dremomys pernyi (Perny's long-nosed squirrel)
    - Dremomys pernyi owstoni
  - Dremomys pyrrhomerus (red-hipped squirrel)
  - Dremomys rufigenis (Asian red-cheeked squirrel)
    - Dremomys rufigenis adamsoni
    - Dremomys rufigenis belfieldi
    - Dremomys rufigenis fuscus
    - Dremomys rufigenis laomache
    - Dremomys rufigenis opimus
    - Dremomys rufigenis ornatus
    - Dremomys rufigenis rufigenis
- Genus Exilisciurus
  - Exilisciurus concinnus (Philippine pygmy squirrel)
  - Exilisciurus exilis (least pygmy squirrel)
  - Exilisciurus whiteheadi (tufted pygmy squirrel)
- Genus Glyphotes
  - Glyphotes simus (sculptor squirrel)
- Genus Hyosciurus
  - Hyosciurus heinrichi (montane long-nosed squirrel)
  - Hyosciurus ileile (lowland long-nosed squirrel)
- Genus Lariscus
  - Lariscus hosei (four-striped ground squirrel)
  - Lariscus insignis (three-striped ground squirrel)
  - Lariscus niobe (Niobe ground squirrel)
  - Lariscus obscurus (Mentawai three-striped squirrel)
- Genus Menetes
  - Menetes berdmorei (Indochinese ground squirrel)
- Genus Nannosciurus
  - Nannosciurus melanotis (black-eared squirrel)
- Genus Prosciurillus
  - Prosciurillus abstrusus (secretive dwarf squirrel)
  - Prosciurillus leucomus (whitish dwarf squirrel)
    - Prosciurillus leucomus occidentalis
  - Prosciurillus murinus (Celebes dwarf squirrel)
  - Prosciurillus weberi (Weber's dwarf squirrel)
- Genus Rhinosciurus
  - Rhinosciurus laticaudatus (shrew-faced squirrel)
- Genus Rubrisciurus
  - Rubrisciurus rubriventer (Sulawesi giant squirrel)
- Genus Sundasciurus (Sunda squirrels)
  - Sundasciurus altitudinis
  - Sundasciurus brookei (Brooke's squirrel)
  - Sundasciurus fraterculus (fraternal squirrel)
  - Sundasciurus hippurus (horse-tailed squirrel)
  - Sundasciurus hoogstraali (Busuanga squirrel)
  - Sundasciurus jentinki (Jentink's squirrel)
  - Sundasciurus juvencus (Northern Palawan tree squirrel)
  - Sundasciurus lowii (Low's squirrel)
  - Sundasciurus mindanensis (Mindanao squirrel)
  - Sundasciurus moellendorffi (Culion tree squirrel)
  - Sundasciurus philippinensis (Philippine tree squirrel)
  - Sundasciurus rabori (Palawan montane squirrel)
  - Sundasciurus robinsoni (Robinson's squirrel)
  - Sundasciurus samarensis (Samar squirrel)
  - Sundasciurus steerii (Southern Palawan tree squirrel)
  - Sundasciurus tahan (Upland squirrel)
  - Sundasciurus tenuis (slender squirrel)
    - Sundasciurus tenuis altitudinus
  - unclassified Sundasciurus
    - Sundasciurus sp. FPF-2017
- Genus Tamiops
  - Tamiops maritimus (maritime striped squirrel)
  - Tamiops mcclellandii (Himalayan striped squirrel)
    - Tamiops mcclellandii barbei
    - Tamiops mcclellandii collinus
    - Tamiops mcclellandii kongensis
    - Tamiops mcclellandii leucotis
    - Tamiops mcclellandii mcclellandii
  - Tamiops minshanica
  - Tamiops rodolphii (Cambodian striped squirrel)
  - Tamiops swinhoei (Swinhoe's striped squirrel)
