= Robinson's squirrel =

Scientific classification
- Kingdom: Animalia
- Phylum: Chordata
- Class: Mammalia
- Order: Rodentia
- Family: Sciuridae
- Genus: Sundasciurus
- Species: S. robinsoni

Binomial name
- Sundasciurus robinsoni (Bonhote, 1902)

Subspecies
- S. r. robinsoni; S. r. balae; S. r. vanakeni

Species of rodent

Sundasciurus robinsoni, or Robinson's squirrel, is a species of rodent in the family Sciuridae. It is found in Indonesia, Malaysia and Thailand. The species Sundasciurus robinsoni has a dorsum that ranges from medium brown with orange agouti to dark brown (S. r. vanakeni), and its venter ranges from white to pale yellow/buff white, with a reduction in the extent of this pale coloration and a lack of distinct margins in the case of S. r. vanakeni. Some populations (S. r. balae and S. r. vanakeni) have a grayish ventral coloration in limbs while others do not (S. r. robinsoni). It can be easily distinguished from other medium-sized western Sundaland Sundasciurus based on its ventral coloration and tail. All populations of S. fraterculus except Siberut, S. tahan, and S. altitudinis have a venter fur coloration homogeneously admixed with gray. The only other medium-sized squirrel found in syntopy, S. tenuis, is also usually ventrally darker (admixed with gray) and dorsally lighter, with reddish-brown coloration on the shoulders and hips, white/pallid yellow hair tips present on tail, and a relatively thinner and longer tail (85–95% of head-body length; than S. robinsoni (56–84% of head-body length). Males of S. fraterculus, S. tahan and S. tenuis have a darker orange wash in the scrotal area than S. robinsoni, which is peach colored.
