= Striped ground squirrel =

Striped ground squirrel may refer to the following squirrels:

- The thirteen-lined ground squirrel (Ictidomys tridecemlineatus or Spermophilus tridecemlineatus), a North American species
- Lariscus, a Southeast Asian genus of four species
- Xerus erythropus, an African species.
