= Natuna squirrel =

Scientific classification
- Kingdom: Animalia
- Phylum: Chordata
- Class: Mammalia
- Order: Rodentia
- Family: Sciuridae
- Genus: Sundasciurus
- Species: S. natunensis

Binomial name
- Sundasciurus natunensis (Thomas, 1895)

Species of rodent

The Natuna squirrel (Sundasciurus natunensis) is a species of rodent in the family Sciuridae. It is endemic to the Natuna Islands of Indonesia. This species first described by Oldfield Thomas in 1895 in a paper titled "Revised determinations of three of the Natuna rodents", where he described it as a subspecies of Sundasciurus lowii. It was recognized as a distinct species in 2020.
