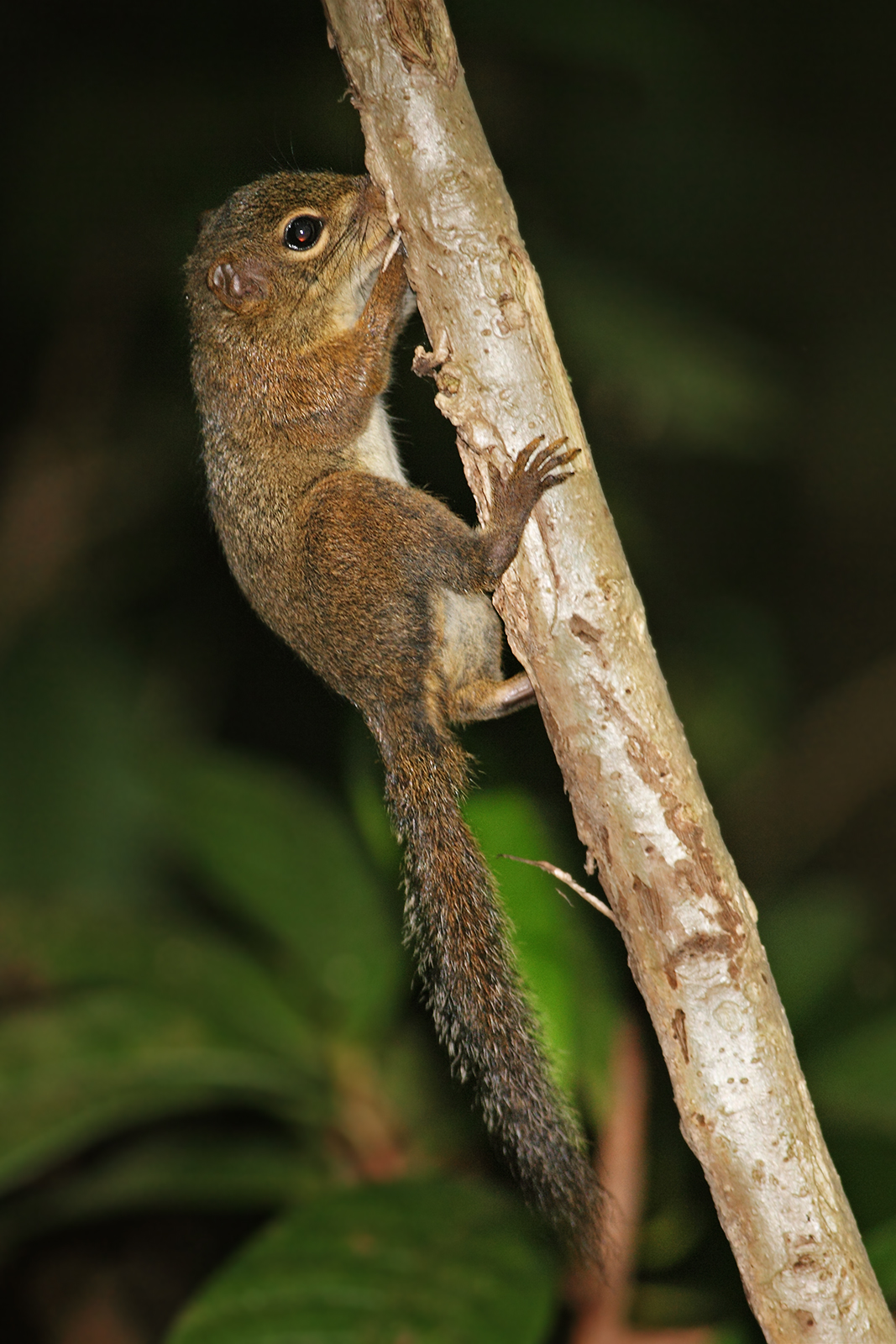
- Slender squirrel (Sundasciurus tenuis)

Scientific classification
- Domain: Eukaryota
- Kingdom: Animalia
- Phylum: Chordata
- Class: Mammalia
- Order: Rodentia
- Family: Sciuridae
- Subfamily: Callosciurinae
- Tribe: Callosciurini
- Genus: Sundasciurus; Moore, 1958

Type species
- Sciurus lowii Thomas, 1914

Species
- Subgenus Sundasciurus; Sundasciurus brookei Sundasciurus fraterculus Sundasciurus jentinki Sundasciurus lowii Sundasciurus tenuis Subgenus Aletesciurus; Sundasciurus davensis Sundasciurus hippurus Sundasciurus hoogstraali Sundasciurus juvencus Sundasciurus mindanensis Sundasciurus moellendorffi Sundasciurus philippinensis Sundasciurus rabori Sundasciurus samarensis Sundasciurus steerii

= Sundasciurus =

Genus of rodents

Sundasciurus is a genus of rodent in the family Sciuridae. It contains 20 species:

- Genus Sundasciurus
  - Sumatran mountain squirrel (Sundasciurus altitudinis)
  - Brooke's squirrel (Sundasciurus brookei)
  - Davao squirrel (Sundasciurus davensis)
  - Bornean mountain ground squirrel (Sundasciurus everetti)
  - Fraternal squirrel (Sundasciurus fraterculus)
  - Horse-tailed squirrel (Sundasciurus hippurus)
  - Busuanga squirrel (Sundasciurus hoogstraali)
  - Jentink's squirrel (Sundasciurus jentinki)
  - Northern Palawan tree squirrel (Sundasciurus juvencus)
  - Low's squirrel (Sundasciurus lowii)
  - Mindanao squirrel (Sundasciurus mindanensis)
  - Culion tree squirrel (Sundasciurus moellendorffi)
  - Natuna squirrel (Sundasciurus natunensis)
  - Philippine tree squirrel (Sundasciurus philippinensis)
  - Palawan montane squirrel (Sundasciurus rabori)
  - Robinson's squirrel (Sundasciurus robinsoni)
  - Samar squirrel (Sundasciurus samarensis)
  - Southern Palawan tree squirrel (Sundasciurus steerii)
  - Upland squirrel (Sundasciurus tahan)
  - Slender squirrel (Sundasciurus tenuis)
