= Sumatran mountain squirrel =

Scientific classification
- Kingdom: Animalia
- Phylum: Chordata
- Class: Mammalia
- Order: Rodentia
- Family: Sciuridae
- Genus: Sundasciurus
- Species: S. altitudinis

Binomial name
- Sundasciurus altitudinis (Robinson & Kloss, 1916)

Species of mammals

The Sumatran mountain squirrel (Sundasciurus altitudinis) is a species of rodent in the family Sciuridae. Its skull reaches sizes between 41–43 mm (1.6–1.7 in), overlapping with that of the Palawan montane squirrel. It was originally described as a subspecies of Sundasciurus tenuis.
