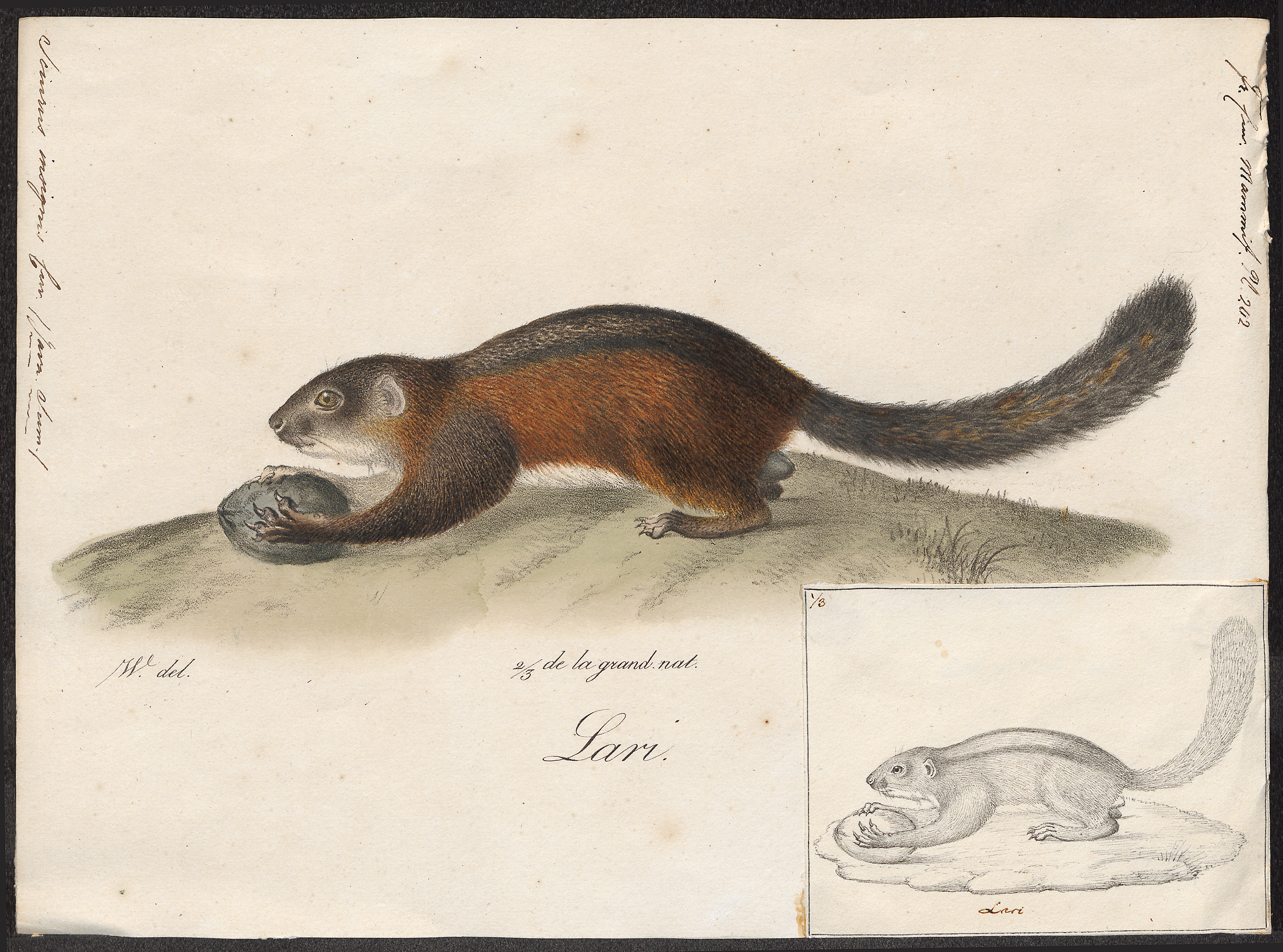

Conservation status
- Least Concern (IUCN 3.1)

Scientific classification
- Kingdom: Animalia
- Phylum: Chordata
- Class: Mammalia
- Order: Rodentia
- Family: Sciuridae
- Genus: Lariscus
- Species: L. insignis

Binomial name
- Lariscus insignis (F. Cuvier, 1821)
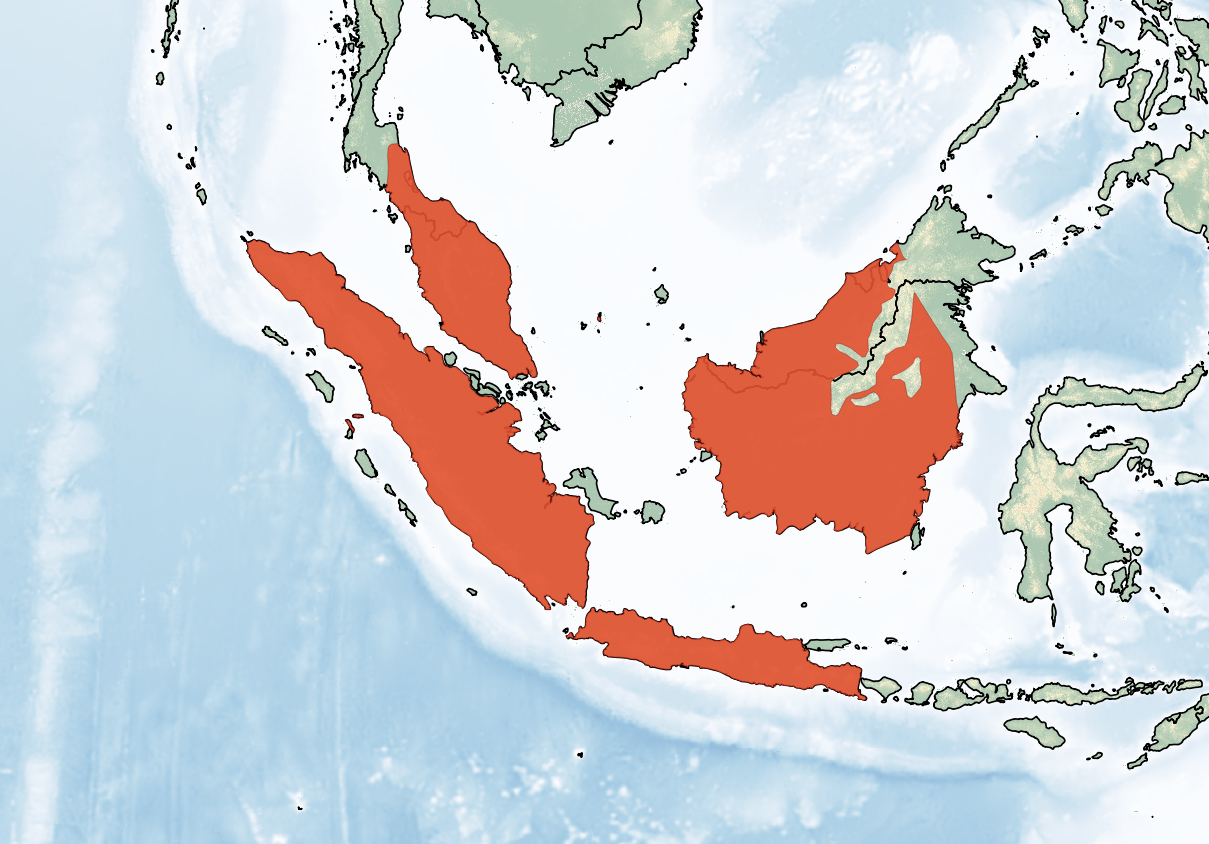

= Three-striped ground squirrel =

Species of rodent

The three-striped ground squirrel (Lariscus insignis) is a species of rodent in the family Sciuridae. It is found in Indonesia, Malaysia, and Thailand.
