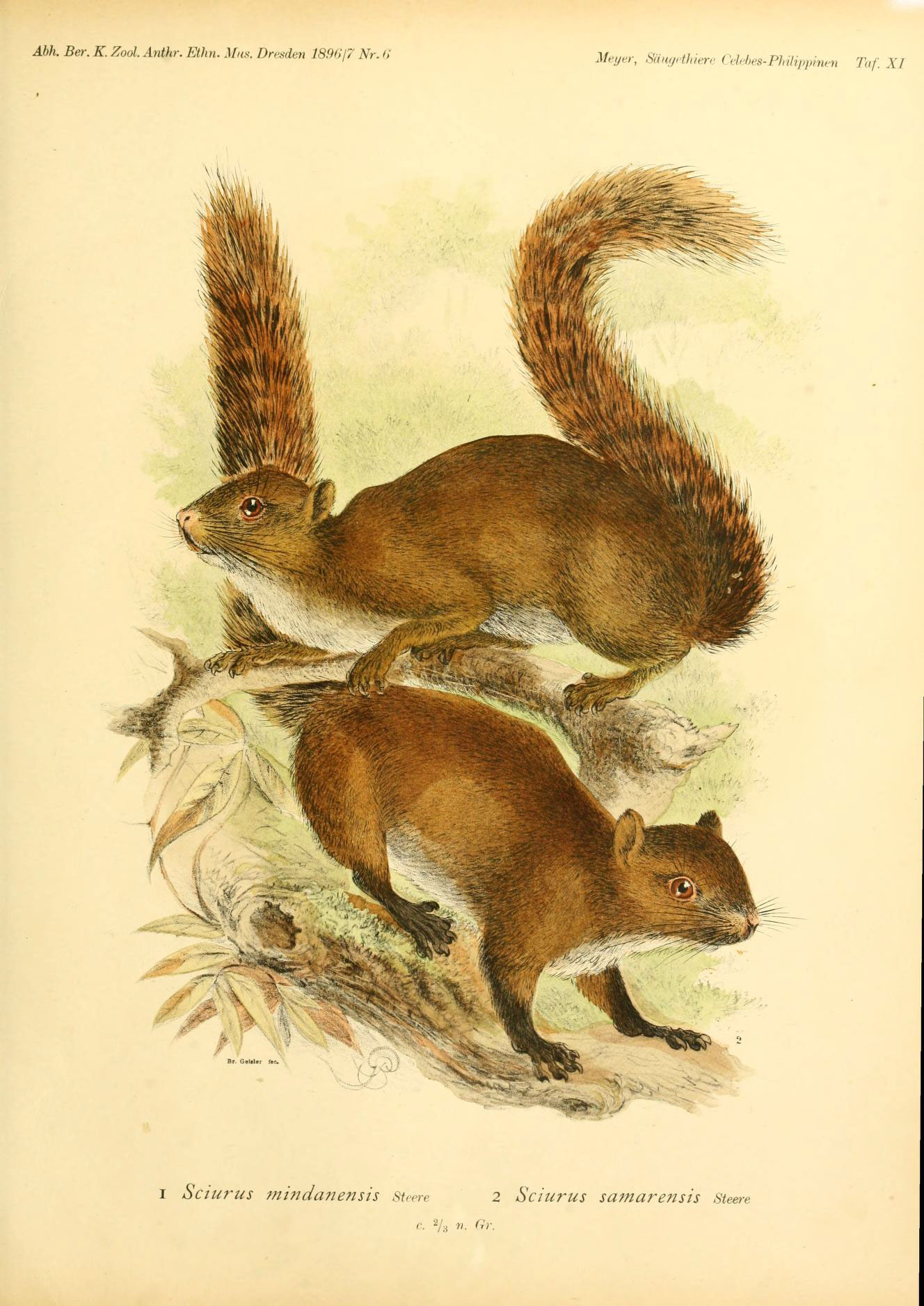

Conservation status
- Least Concern (IUCN 3.1)

Scientific classification
- Kingdom: Animalia
- Phylum: Chordata
- Class: Mammalia
- Order: Rodentia
- Family: Sciuridae
- Genus: Sundasciurus
- Species: S. samarensis

Binomial name
- Sundasciurus samarensis (Steere, 1890)
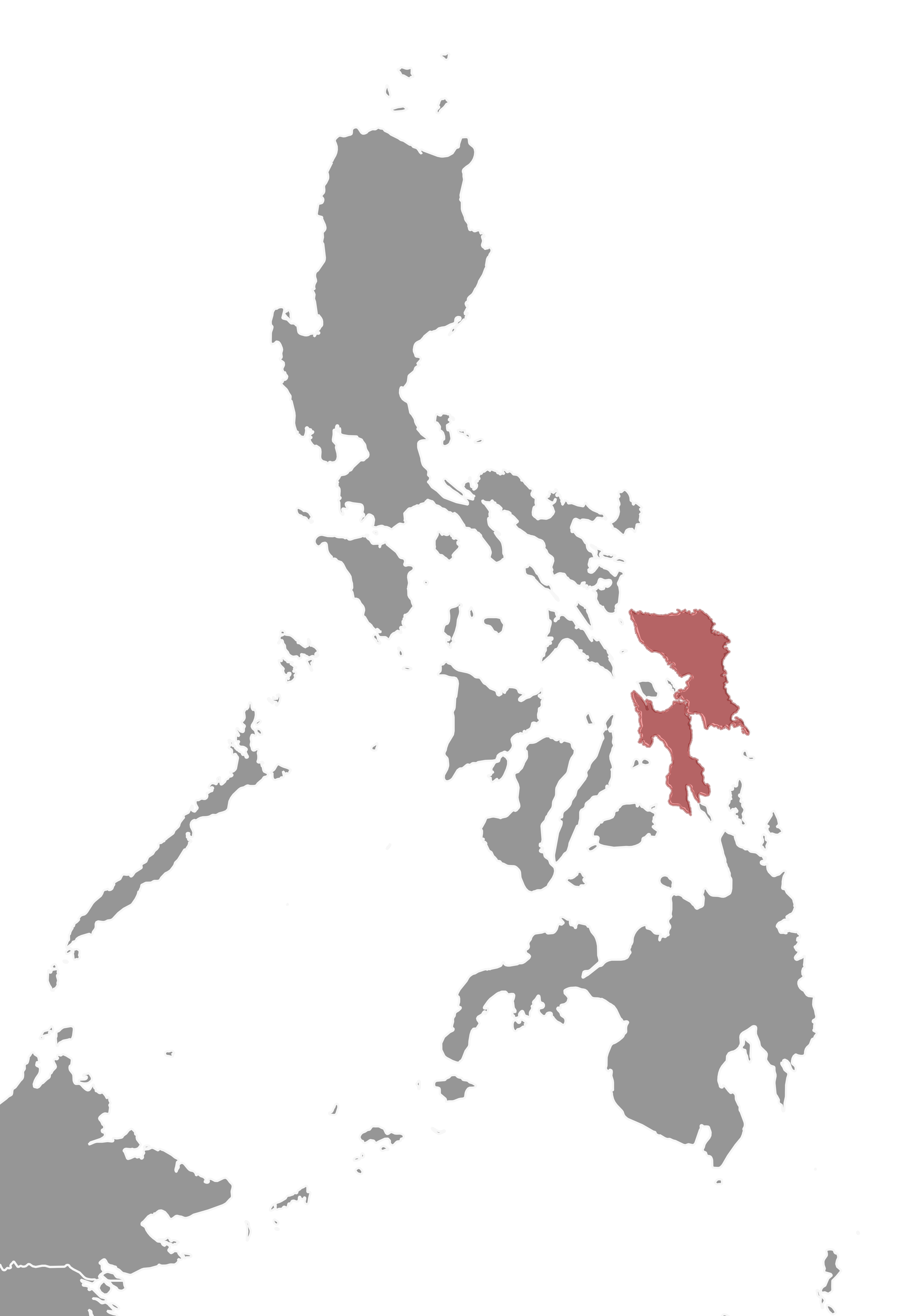

= Samar squirrel =

Species of rodent

The Samar squirrel (Sundasciurus samarensis) is a species of rodent in the family Sciuridae. It was historically known as lalagsing. It is endemic to the Philippines, where it has been recorded from Samar and Leyte Islands. Its natural habitat is subtropical or tropical dry forests. It is threatened by habitat loss, due to expanding human activities, hunting, and the lack of basic knowledge about the species. They thrive in primary and secondary lowland and montane forest, including the lower edges of mossy forest. It is also found in some agricultural areas.
