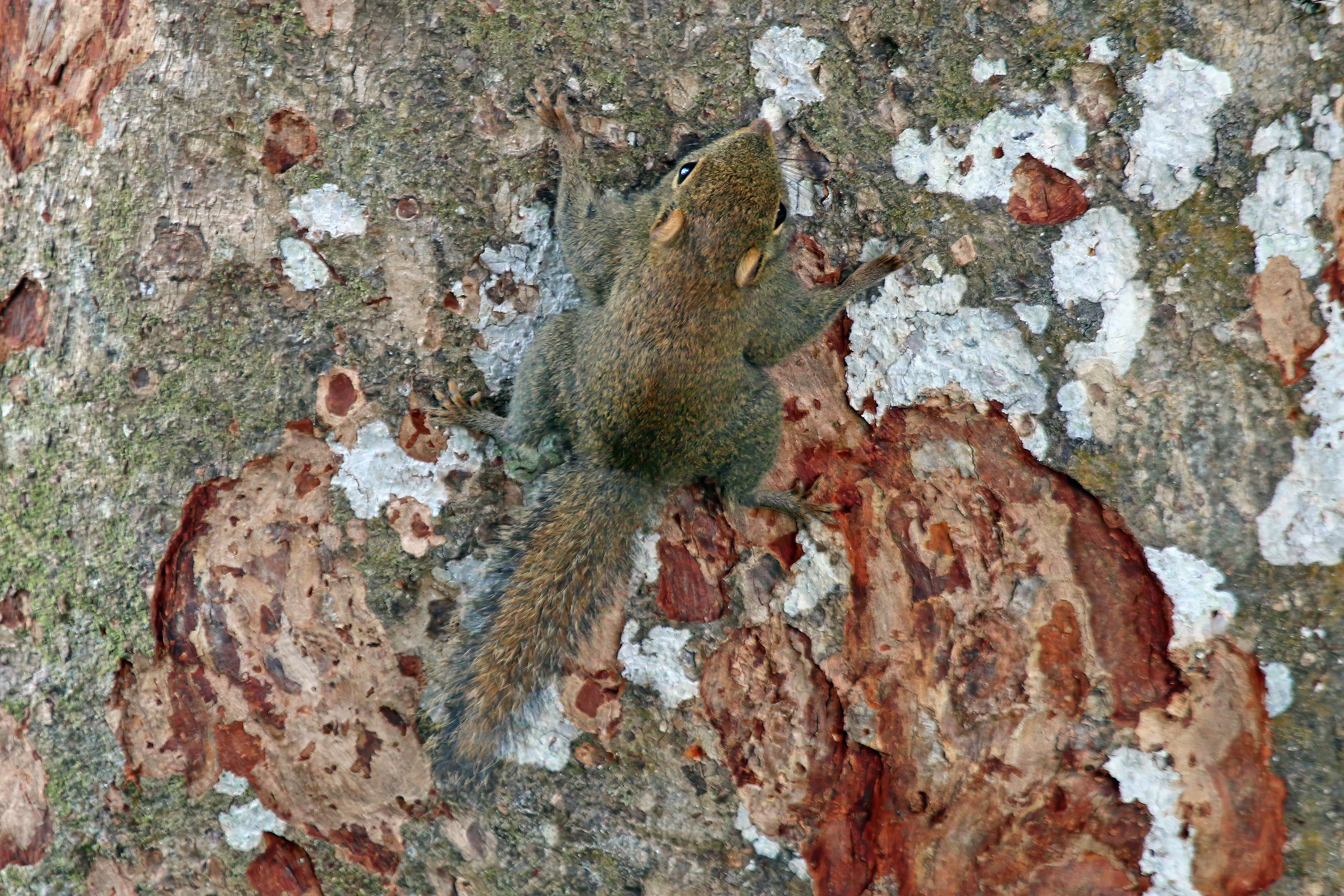
- Exilisciurus exilis in Sabah, Malaysia

Scientific classification
- Kingdom: Animalia
- Phylum: Chordata
- Class: Mammalia
- Order: Rodentia
- Family: Sciuridae
- Subfamily: Callosciurinae
- Genus: Exilisciurus; Moore, 1958

Type species
- Sciurus exilis S. Müller, 1838

Species
- E. concinnus (Thomas, 1888); E. exilis (Müller, 1838); E. whiteheadi (Thomas, 1887)

= Exilisciurus =

Genus of rodents

Exilisciurus is a genus of rodent in the family Sciuridae from forests in Southeast Asia. These tiny squirrels are mostly olive-brown to grey-brown, although E. whiteheadi has conspicuous ear-tufts. They are active, and feed on both plant-material and insects.

There are three species of Exilisciurus:

- Philippine pygmy squirrel, Exilisciurus concinnus
- Least (or plain) pygmy squirrel, Exilisciurus exilis
- Tufted pygmy squirrel, Exilisciurus whiteheadi
