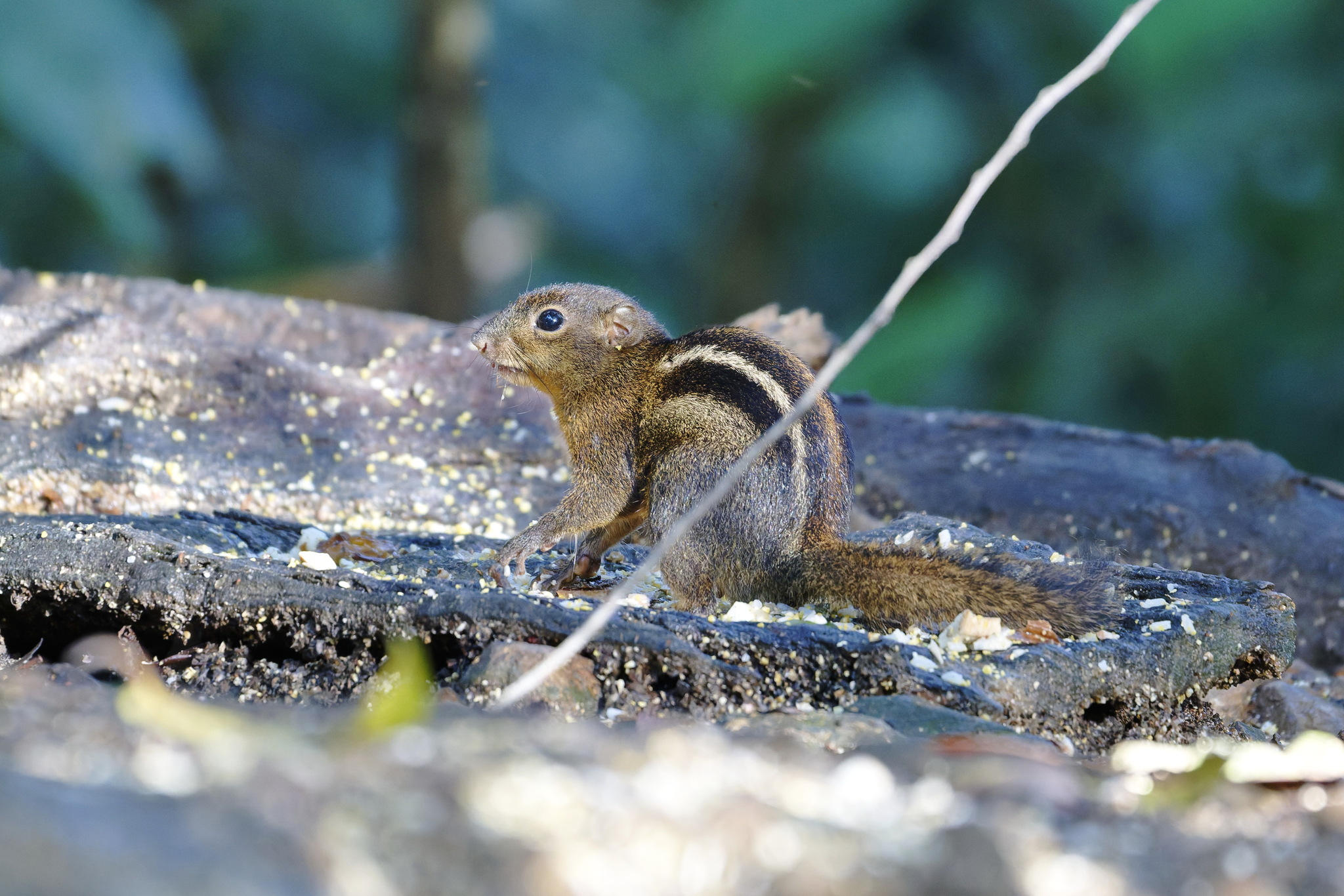

Conservation status
- Least Concern (IUCN 3.1)

Scientific classification
- Kingdom: Animalia
- Phylum: Chordata
- Class: Mammalia
- Infraclass: Placentalia
- Order: Rodentia
- Family: Sciuridae
- Genus: Lariscus
- Species: L. hosei

Binomial name
- Lariscus hosei (Thomas, 1892)

Synonyms
- Sciurus hosei

= Four-striped ground squirrel =

Species of rodent

The four-striped ground squirrel (Lariscus hosei) is a species of rodent in the family Sciuridae. It is endemic to Borneo. Its natural habitat is subtropical or tropical dry forests. It is threatened by habitat loss.
