= Lowland long-nosed squirrel =

Conservation status
- Least Concern (IUCN 3.1)

Scientific classification
- Kingdom: Animalia
- Phylum: Chordata
- Class: Mammalia
- Order: Rodentia
- Family: Sciuridae
- Genus: Hyosciurus
- Species: H. ileile

Binomial name
- Hyosciurus ileile Tate & Archbold, 1936

Species of rodent

The lowland long-nosed squirrel (Hyosciurus ileile) is a species of rodent in the family Sciuridae. It is endemic to Sulawesi, Indonesia where its natural habitat is subtropical or tropical dry lowland grassland.
