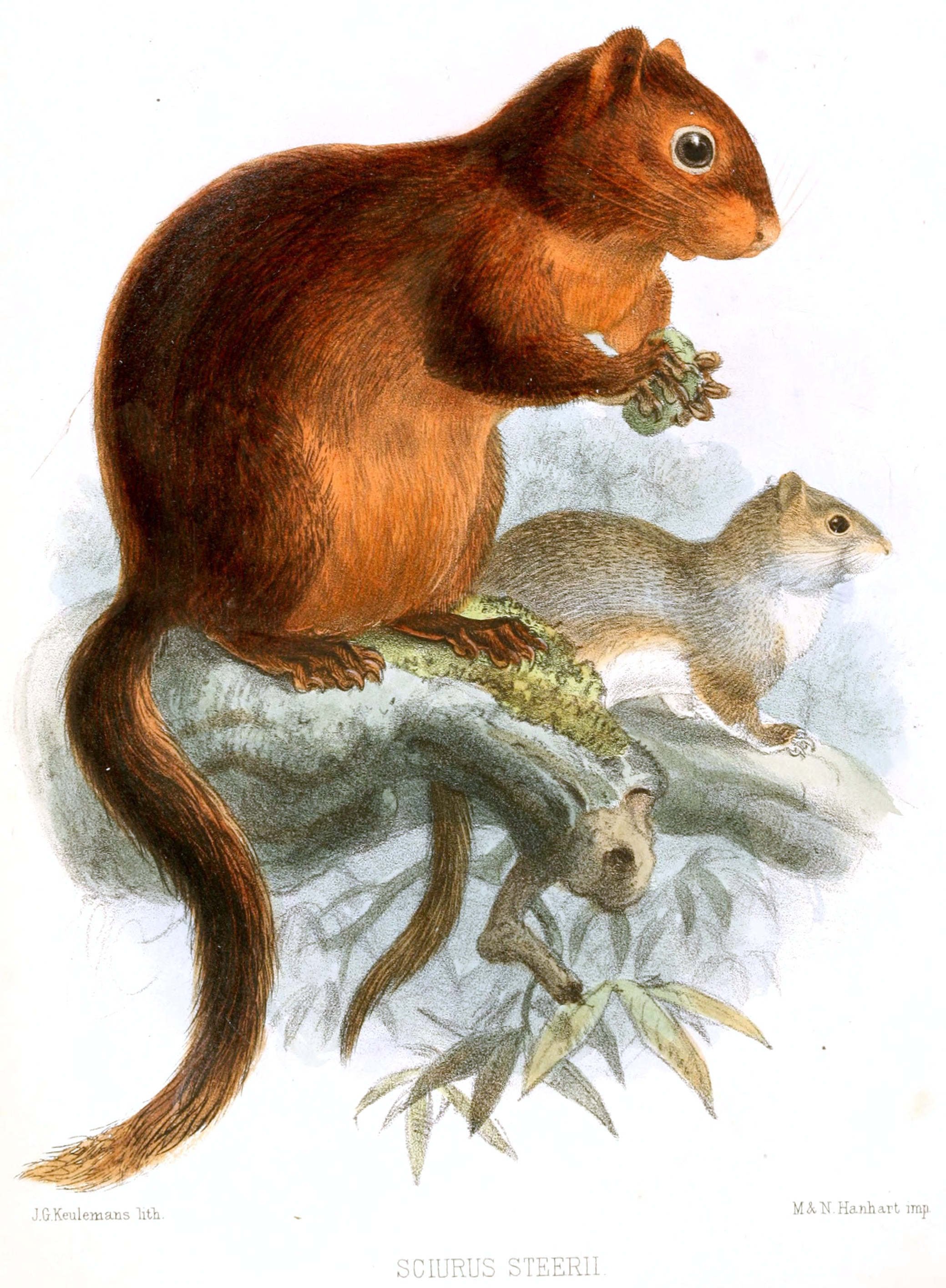

Conservation status
- Least Concern (IUCN 3.1)

Scientific classification
- Kingdom: Animalia
- Phylum: Chordata
- Class: Mammalia
- Order: Rodentia
- Family: Sciuridae
- Genus: Sundasciurus
- Species: S. steerii

Binomial name
- Sundasciurus steerii (Günther, 1877)
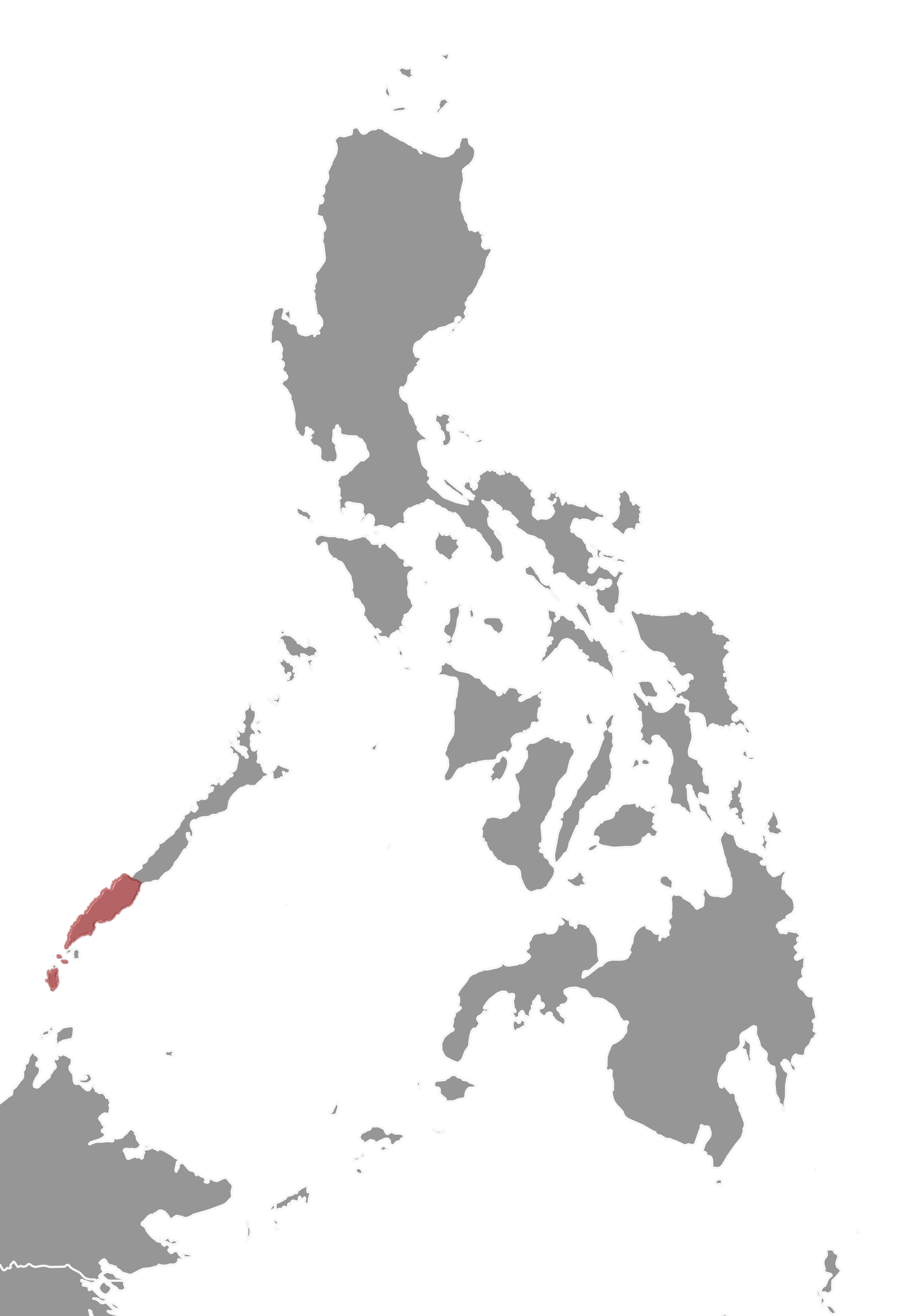

= Southern Palawan tree squirrel =

Species of rodent

The Southern Palawan Tree Squirrel (Sundasciurus steerii) (local name "bising") is a species of rodent in the family Sciuridae. It is endemic to the Philippines. Its natural habitat is subtropical or tropical dry forests.

Two nematodes were discovered in 1967 when researching the Southern Palawan Tree Squirrel, they were named Brevistriata sundasciuri and Calypsostrongylus.
