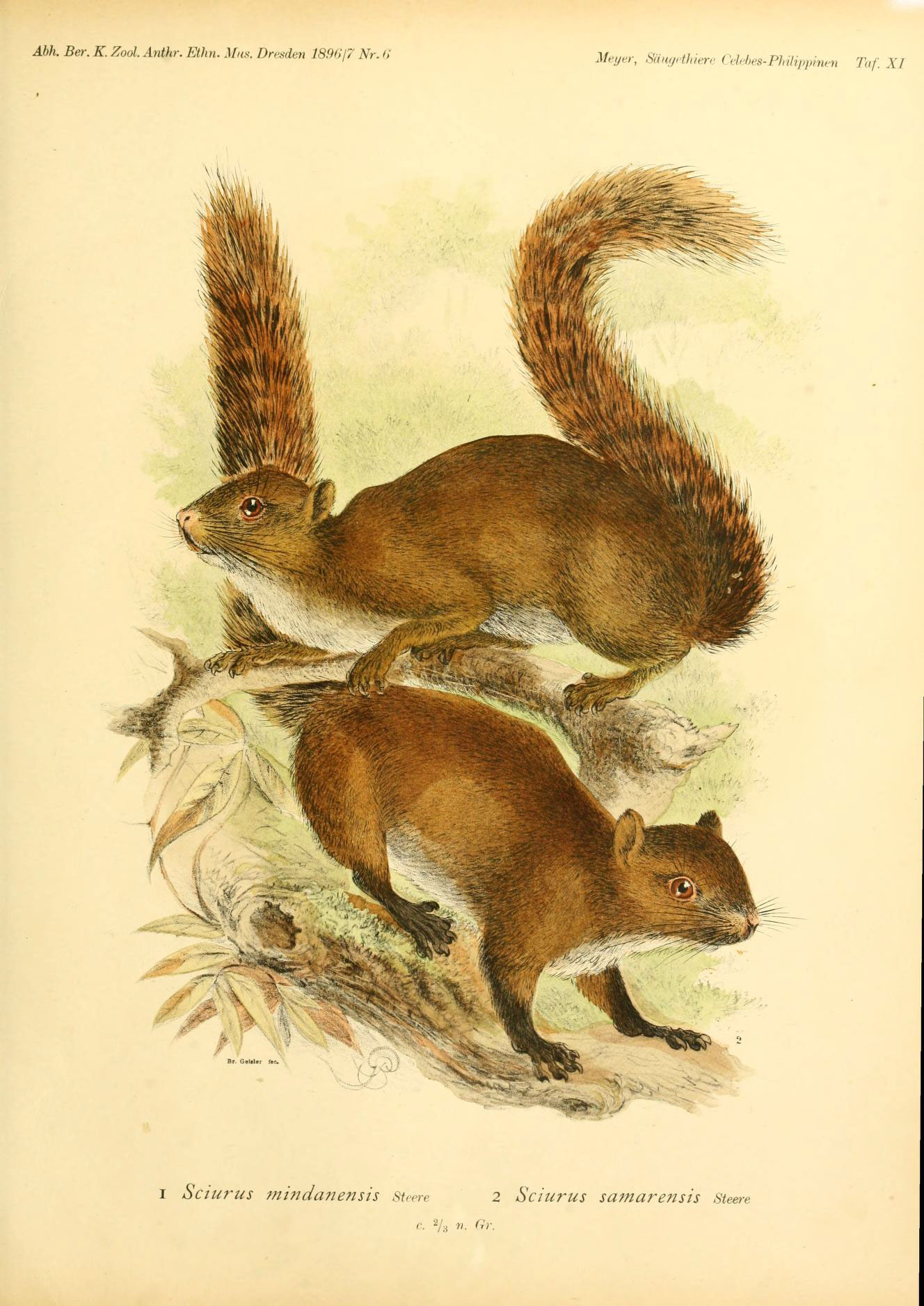

Conservation status
- Least Concern (IUCN 3.1)

Scientific classification
- Kingdom: Animalia
- Phylum: Chordata
- Class: Mammalia
- Order: Rodentia
- Family: Sciuridae
- Genus: Sundasciurus
- Species: S. mindanensis

Binomial name
- Sundasciurus mindanensis (Steere, 1890)
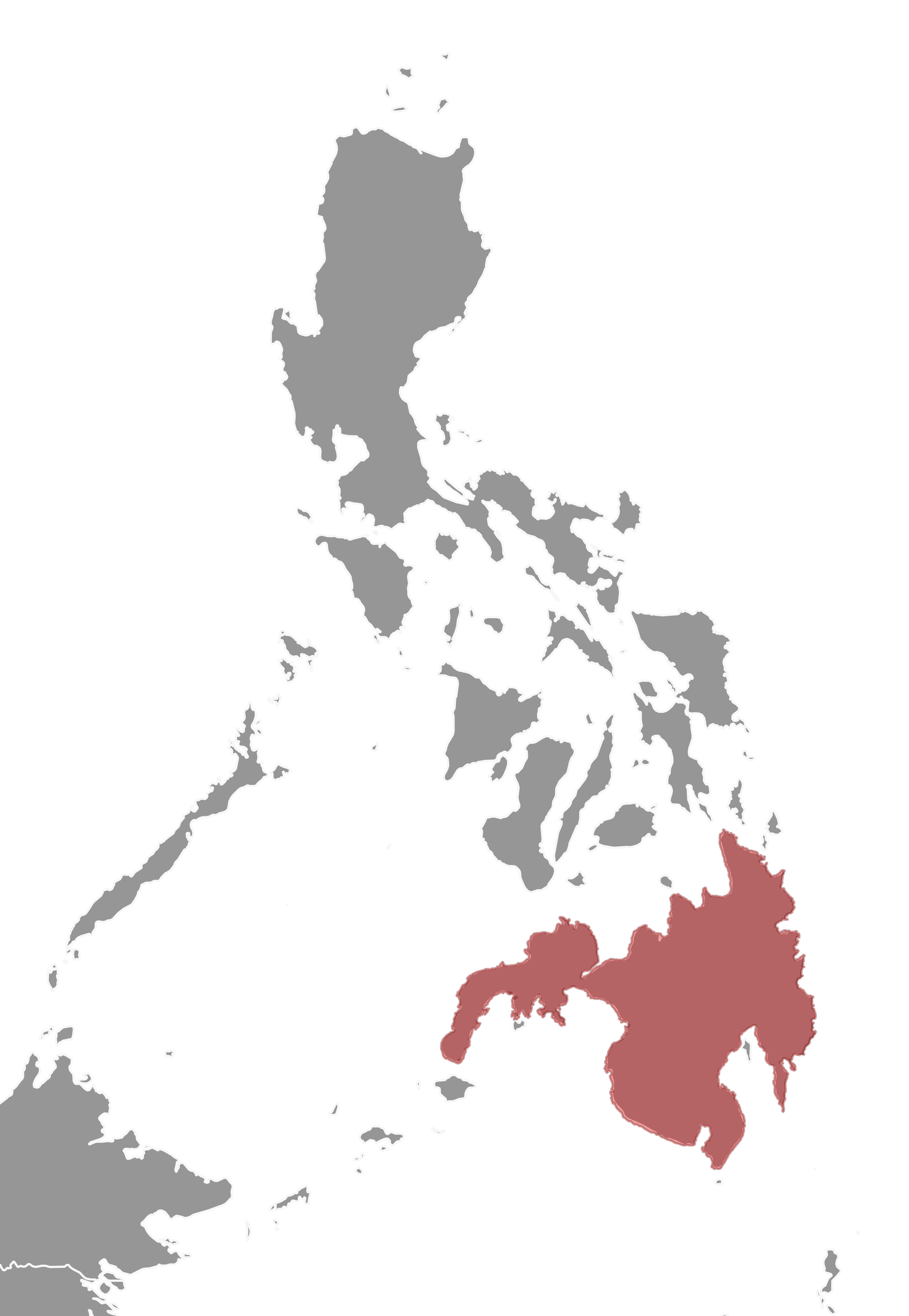

= Mindanao squirrel =

Species of rodent

The Mindanao squirrel (Sundasciurus mindanensis) is a species of rodent in the family Sciuridae. It is endemic to the Philippines.

In April 22-27, 2024, the Department of Environment and Natural Resources in Socsargen and Davao Region documented the rarest sightings of the endemic Philippine pygmy squirrel and Mindanao squirrel inhabiting the 80,864-hectare Mount Apo Natural Park, Director Felix Alicer said.
