= Northern Palawan tree squirrel =

Conservation status
- Least Concern (IUCN 3.1)

Scientific classification
- Kingdom: Animalia
- Phylum: Chordata
- Class: Mammalia
- Order: Rodentia
- Family: Sciuridae
- Genus: Sundasciurus
- Species: S. juvencus

Binomial name
- Sundasciurus juvencus (Thomas, 1908)
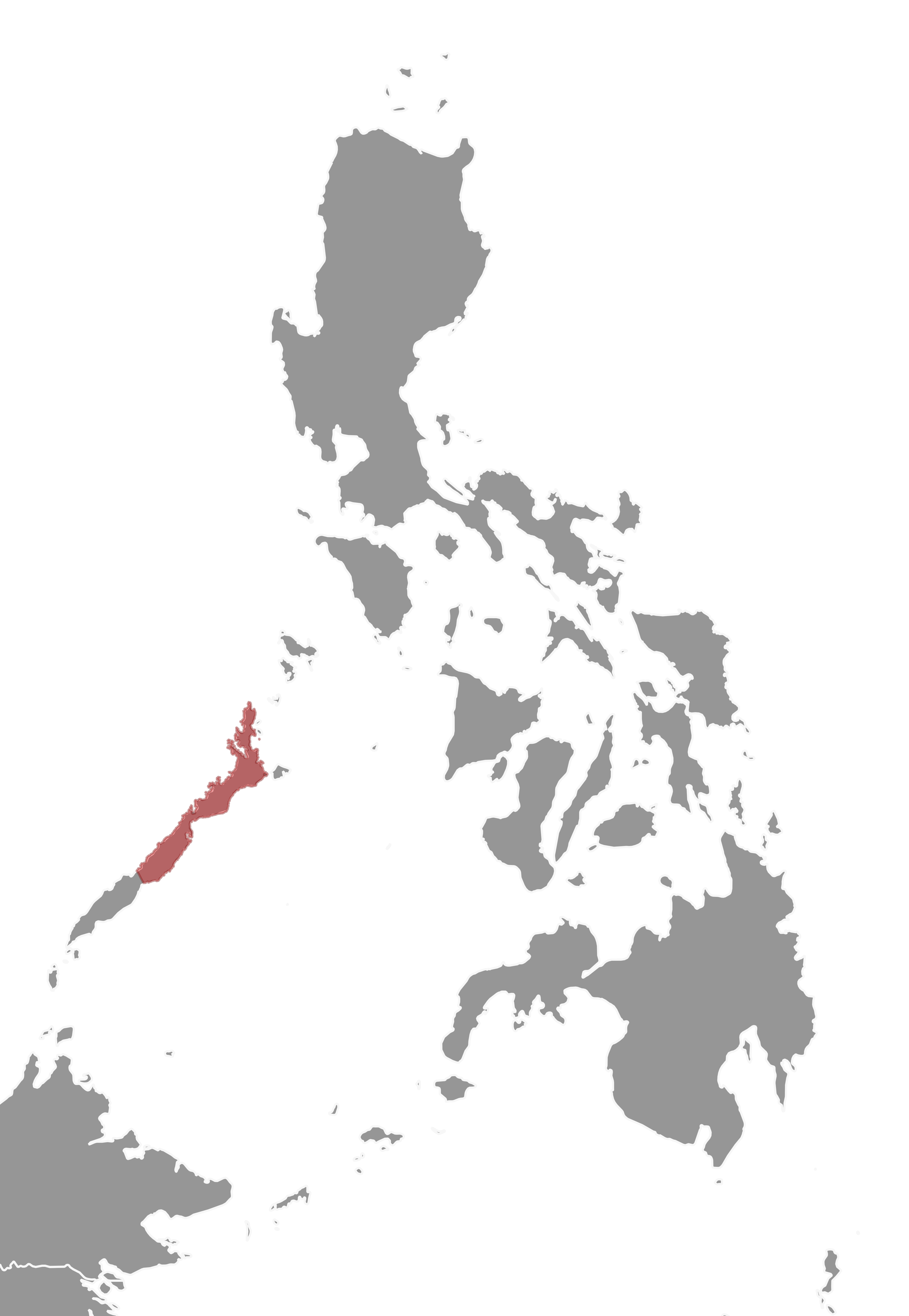

Species of rodent

The Northern Palawan tree squirrel (Sundasciurus juvencus) is a species of rodent in the family Sciuridae. It is endemic to the Philippines. Its natural habitat is subtropical or tropical dry forests.
