= Niobe ground squirrel =

Conservation status
- Data Deficient (IUCN 3.1)

Scientific classification
- Kingdom: Animalia
- Phylum: Chordata
- Class: Mammalia
- Order: Rodentia
- Family: Sciuridae
- Genus: Lariscus
- Species: L. niobe

Binomial name
- Lariscus niobe (Thomas, 1898)

Species of rodent

The Niobe ground squirrel (Lariscus niobe) is a species of rodent in the family Sciuridae. It is endemic to the mountains of western Sumatra, and eastern Java, in Indonesia. Its natural habitat is subtropical or tropical dry forests.
