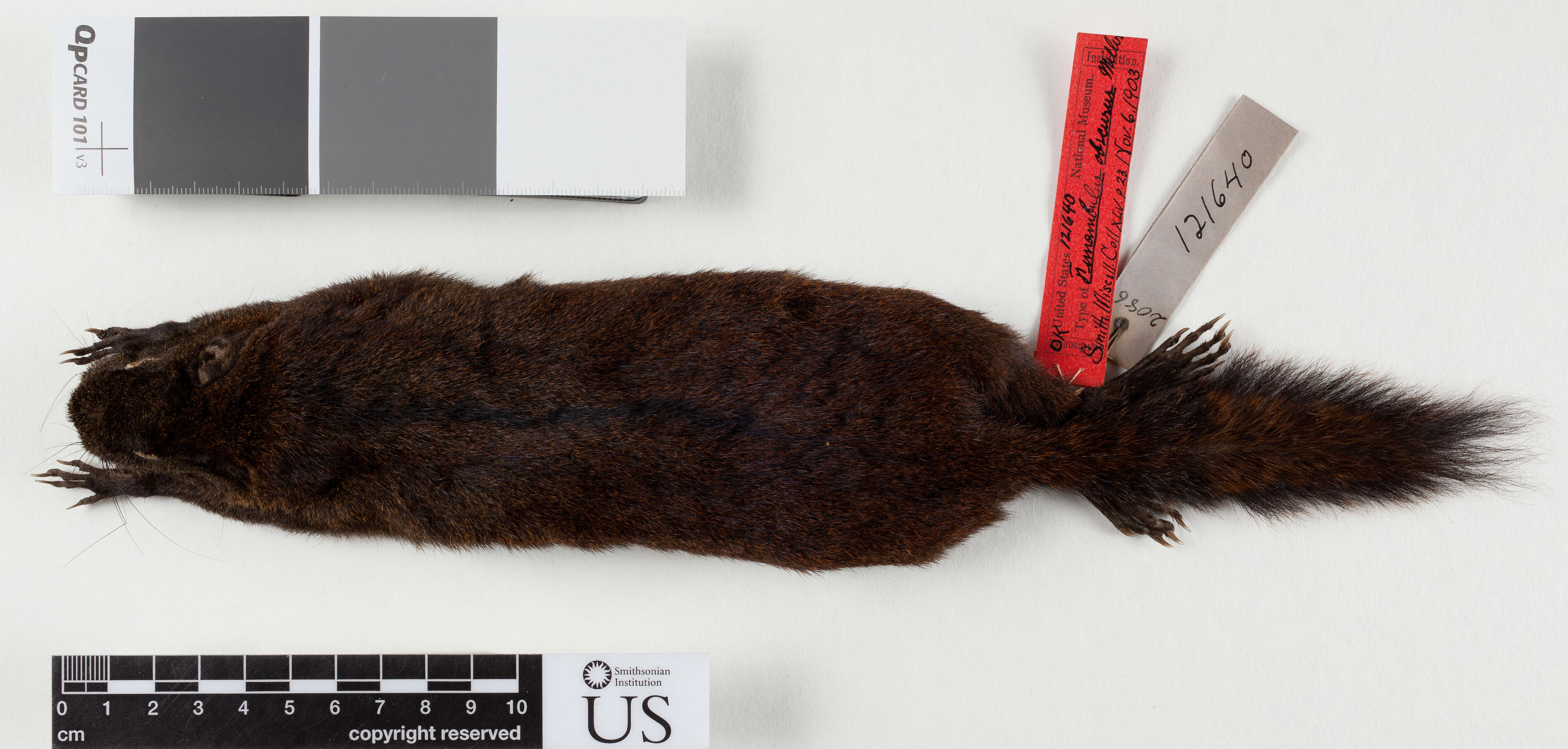

Conservation status
- Near Threatened (IUCN 3.1)

Scientific classification
- Kingdom: Animalia
- Phylum: Chordata
- Class: Mammalia
- Order: Rodentia
- Family: Sciuridae
- Genus: Lariscus
- Species: L. obscurus

Binomial name
- Lariscus obscurus (Miller, 1903)

= Mentawai three-striped squirrel =

Species of rodent

The Mentawai three-striped squirrel (Lariscus obscurus) is a species of rodent in the family Sciuridae. It is endemic to Indonesia and has a natural habitat of subtropical or tropical dry forests.
