= Brooke's squirrel =

Conservation status
- Least Concern (IUCN 3.1)

Scientific classification
- Kingdom: Animalia
- Phylum: Chordata
- Class: Mammalia
- Order: Rodentia
- Family: Sciuridae
- Genus: Sundasciurus
- Species: S. brookei

Binomial name
- Sundasciurus brookei (Thomas, 1892)

Species of rodent

Brooke's squirrel (Sundasciurus brookei) is a species of rodent in the family Sciuridae. It is found in Indonesia and Malaysia. Its natural habitat is subtropical or tropical dry forests. It is threatened by habitat loss. It was named for Charles Brooke, the second White Rajah of Sarawak by Oldfield Thomas from a specimen collected by Charles Hose on Mt Dulit.
