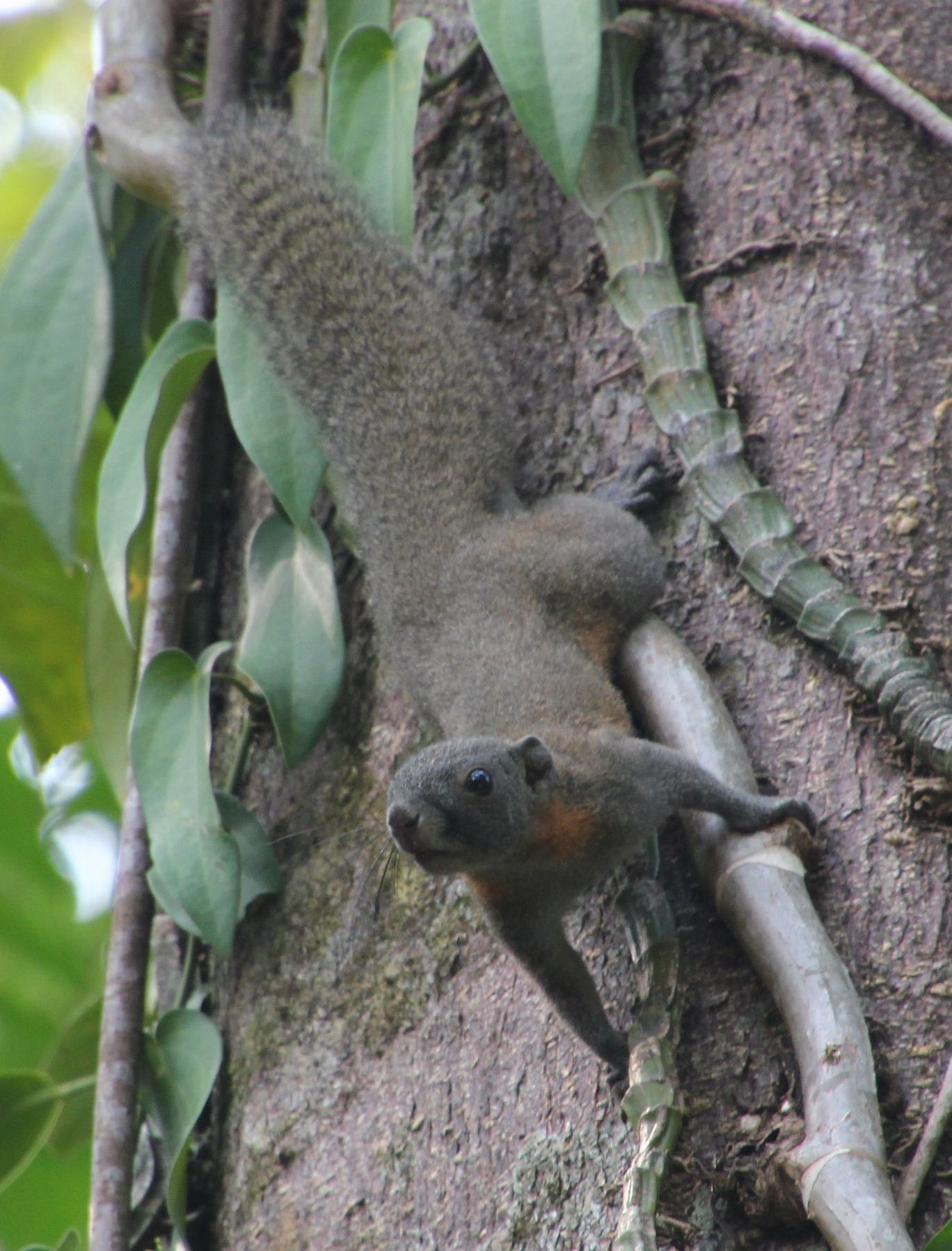

Conservation status
- Near Threatened (IUCN 3.1)

Scientific classification
- Kingdom: Animalia
- Phylum: Chordata
- Class: Mammalia
- Infraclass: Placentalia
- Order: Rodentia
- Family: Sciuridae
- Genus: Sundasciurus
- Species: S. hippurus

Binomial name
- Sundasciurus hippurus (I. Geoffroy, 1831)

Subspecies
- S. h. hippurus; S. h. borneensis; S. h. pryeri; S. h. hippurosus; S. h. ornatus
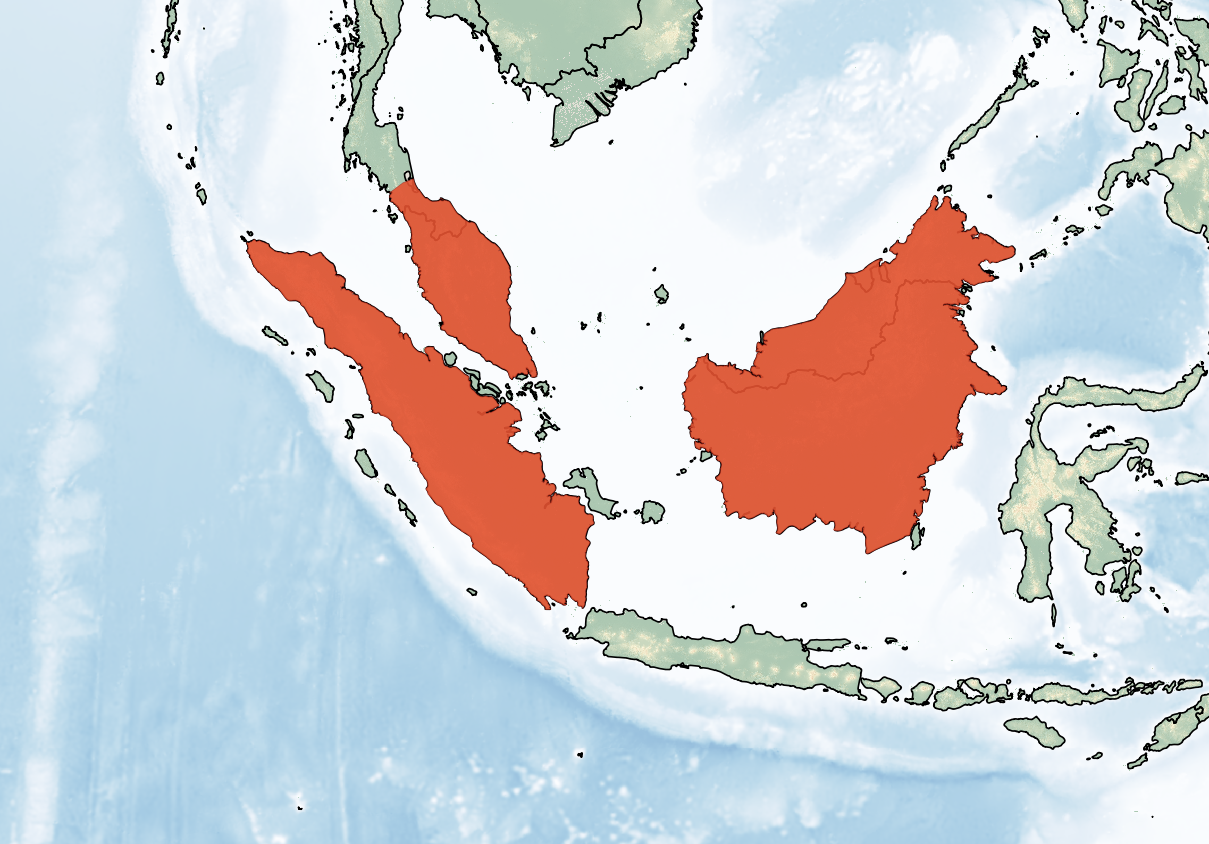

= Horse-tailed squirrel =

Species of rodent

The horse-tailed squirrel (Sundasciurus hippurus) is a species of rodent in the family Sciuridae. It is found throughout the islands of Borneo and Sumatra, as well as the southern half of the Malay Peninsula, which includes the entire nations of Brunei and Malaysia, as well as some areas of Indonesia and Thailand. There was a mention of this squirrel being found in Vietnam in 1831 (I. Geoffroy, 1831), but subsequent descriptions of this squirrel's range have not included that nation.

== Description ==
The horse-tailed squirrel is the most colorful and largest of the Sundasciurus tree squirrels. It is a medium-sized squirrel with a head-to-body length of 21.5 to 25 cm (8.5 to 9.8 in) and a tail length of 24 to 29 cm (9.5 to 11.5 in). The horse-tailed squirrel has a grizzled grey head, shoulders, forefeet and body with a whitish, dull orange, or red-brown underbelly. The tail of this squirrel is commonly a glossy black or grey banded with black.
