= Philippine pygmy squirrel =

Conservation status
- Least Concern (IUCN 3.1)]

Scientific classification
- Kingdom: Animalia
- Phylum: Chordata
- Class: Mammalia
- Order: Rodentia
- Family: Sciuridae
- Genus: Exilisciurus
- Species: E. concinnus

Binomial name
- Exilisciurus concinnus (Thomas, 1888)
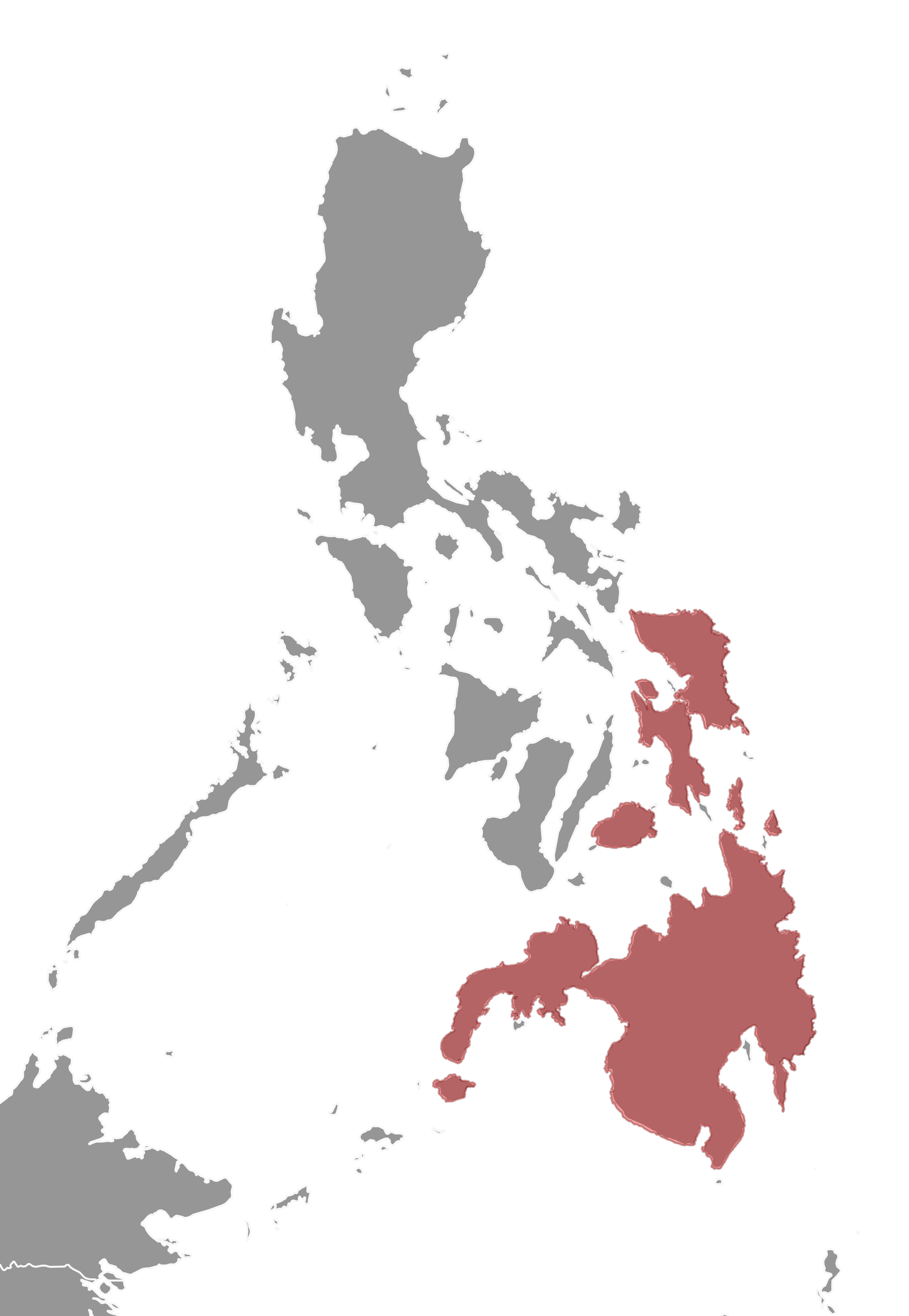

Species of rodent

The Philippine pygmy squirrel (Exilisciurus concinnus) is a species of rodent in the family Sciuridae. It is endemic to the Philippines.

In April 22-27, 2024, the Department of Environment and Natural Resources in Socsargen and Davao Region documented the rarest sightings of the endemic Philippine pygmy squirrel and Mindanao squirrel inhabiting the 80,864-hectare Mount Apo Natural Park, Director Felix Alicer said.
