= Montane long-nosed squirrel =

Conservation status
- Least Concern (IUCN 3.1)

Scientific classification
- Kingdom: Animalia
- Phylum: Chordata
- Class: Mammalia
- Order: Rodentia
- Family: Sciuridae
- Genus: Hyosciurus
- Species: H. heinrichi

Binomial name
- Hyosciurus heinrichi Archbold & Tate, 1935

Species of rodent

The montane long-nosed squirrel (Hyosciurus heinrichi) is a species of rodent in the family Sciuridae. It is endemic to central Sulawesi, Indonesia. Its natural habitat is subtropical or tropical dry lowland grassland. It was discovered during a 1930 expedition led by Gerd Heinrich.
