= Busuanga squirrel =

Conservation status
- Least Concern (IUCN 3.1)

Scientific classification
- Kingdom: Animalia
- Phylum: Chordata
- Class: Mammalia
- Order: Rodentia
- Family: Sciuridae
- Genus: Sundasciurus
- Species: S. hoogstraali

Binomial name
- Sundasciurus hoogstraali (Sanborn, 1952)
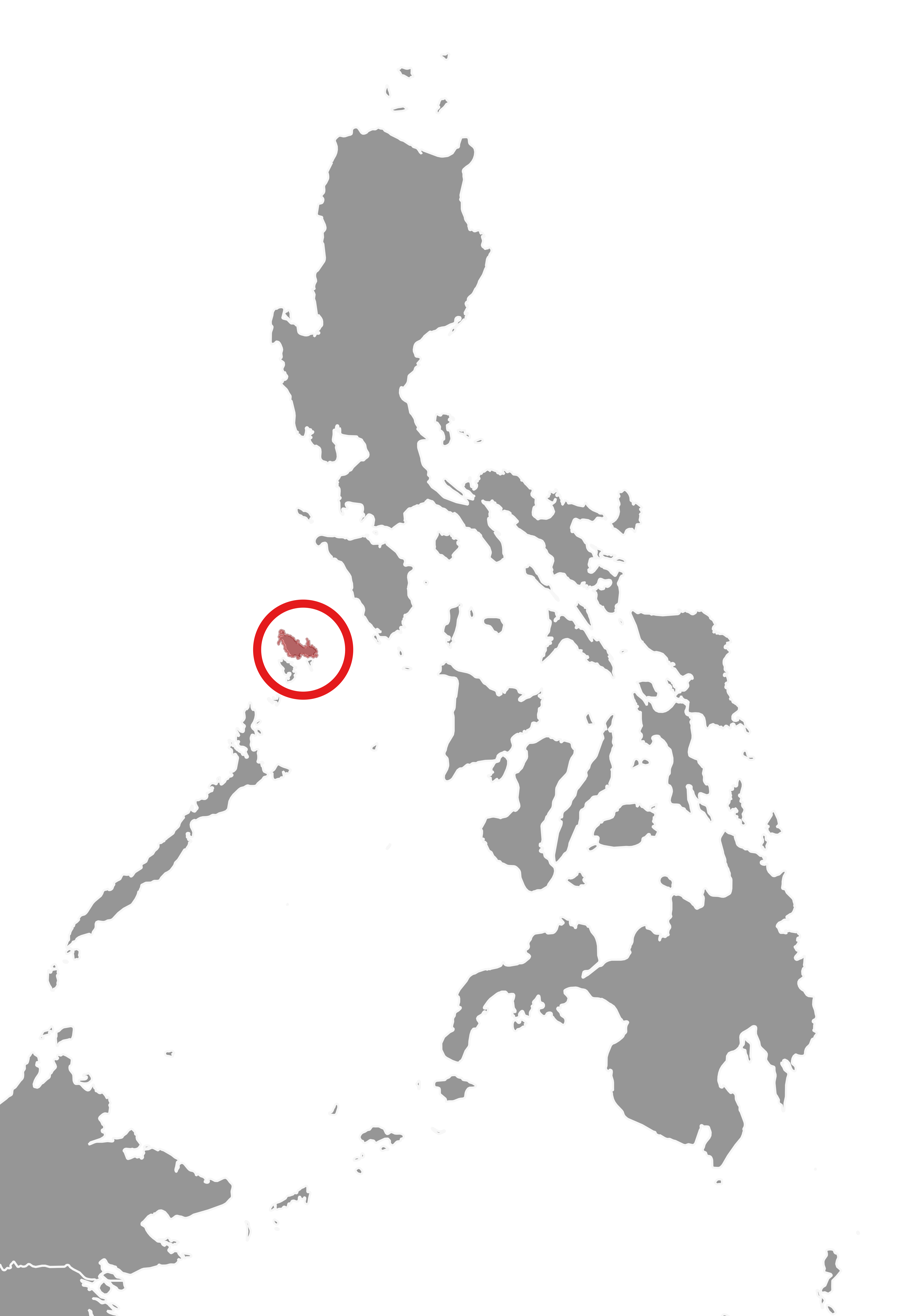

Species of rodent

The Busuanga squirrel (Sundasciurus hoogstraali) is a species of rodent in the family Sciuridae. It is endemic to the Philippines.
