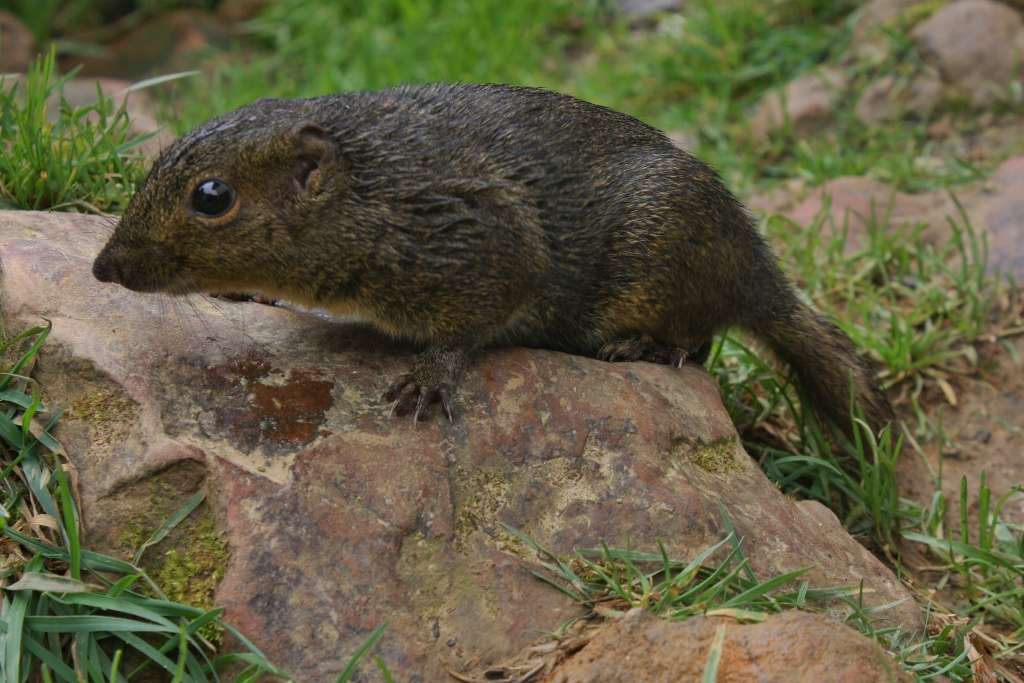

Conservation status
- Least Concern (IUCN 3.1)

Scientific classification
- Kingdom: Animalia
- Phylum: Chordata
- Class: Mammalia
- Order: Rodentia
- Family: Sciuridae
- Genus: Sundasciurus
- Species: S. everetti

Binomial name
- Sundasciurus everetti (Thomas, 1890)

Synonyms
- Dremomys everetti

= Bornean mountain ground squirrel =

Species of rodent

The Bornean mountain ground squirrel (Sundasciurus everetti) is a species of rodent in the family Sciuridae. The scientific name commemorates British colonial administrator and zoological collector Alfred Hart Everett.

== Distribution and habitat ==
It is found in Indonesia and Malaysia.
