= Jentink's squirrel =

Conservation status
- Least Concern (IUCN 3.1)

Scientific classification
- Kingdom: Animalia
- Phylum: Chordata
- Class: Mammalia
- Order: Rodentia
- Family: Sciuridae
- Genus: Sundasciurus
- Species: S. jentinki

Binomial name
- Sundasciurus jentinki (Thomas, 1887)

Species of rodent

Jentink's squirrel (Sundasciurus jentinki) is a species of rodent in the family Sciuridae. It is named in honor of the Dutch zoologist Fredericus Anna Jentink. It is found in Indonesia and Malaysia. Its natural habitat is subtropical or tropical dry forests. It is threatened by habitat loss.
