= Philippine tree squirrel =

Conservation status
- Least Concern (IUCN 3.1)

Scientific classification
- Kingdom: Animalia
- Phylum: Chordata
- Class: Mammalia
- Order: Rodentia
- Family: Sciuridae
- Genus: Sundasciurus
- Species: S. philippinensis

Binomial name
- Sundasciurus philippinensis (Waterhouse, 1839)
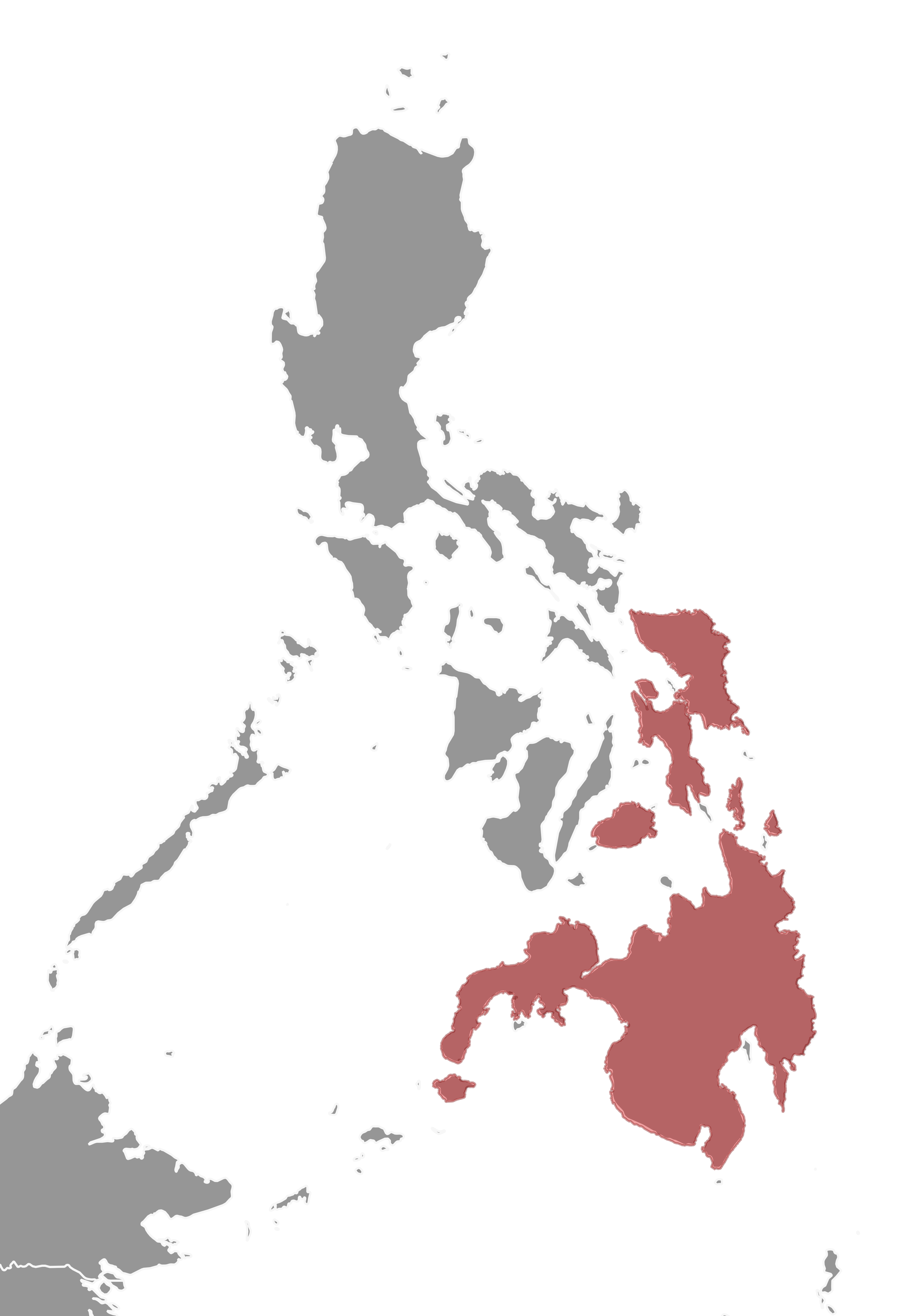

Species of rodent

The Philippine tree squirrel (Sundasciurus philippinensis) is a species of rodent in the family Sciuridae which is endemic to the Philippines. The Philippine tree squirrel can only be found in Palawan, Bohol, Leyte and Samar and in Siargao. It is locally known as laksoy or kulagsing in the Visayan languages, like other endemic Philippine squirrels.

It was described by Waterhouse in 1839 in Proc. Zool. Soc. London, 1839:117, UPLB Museum of Natural History reported.
