= Hyosciurus =

Scientific classification
- Domain: Eukaryota
- Kingdom: Animalia
- Phylum: Chordata
- Class: Mammalia
- Order: Rodentia
- Family: Sciuridae
- Subfamily: Callosciurinae
- Genus: Hyosciurus; Archbold & Tate, 1935

Type species
- Hyosciurus heinrichi Archbold & Tate, 1935

Species
- Hyosciurus heinrichi Hyosciurus ileile

Genus of rodents

Hyosciurus is a genus of rodents in the family Sciuridae endemic to Sulawesi, Indonesia. It contains the following species:

- Montane long-nosed squirrel (Hyosciurus heinrichi)
- Lowland long-nosed squirrel (Hyosciurus ileile)

The genus name is a combination of Greek hys, hyos, meaning 'pig', and skiouros, meaning 'squirrel', in reference to the snouts which are relatively long compared to other squirrels.
