= Culion tree squirrel =

Conservation status
- Near Threatened (IUCN 3.1)

Scientific classification
- Kingdom: Animalia
- Phylum: Chordata
- Class: Mammalia
- Order: Rodentia
- Family: Sciuridae
- Genus: Sundasciurus
- Species: S. moellendorffi

Binomial name
- Sundasciurus moellendorffi (Matschie, 1898)
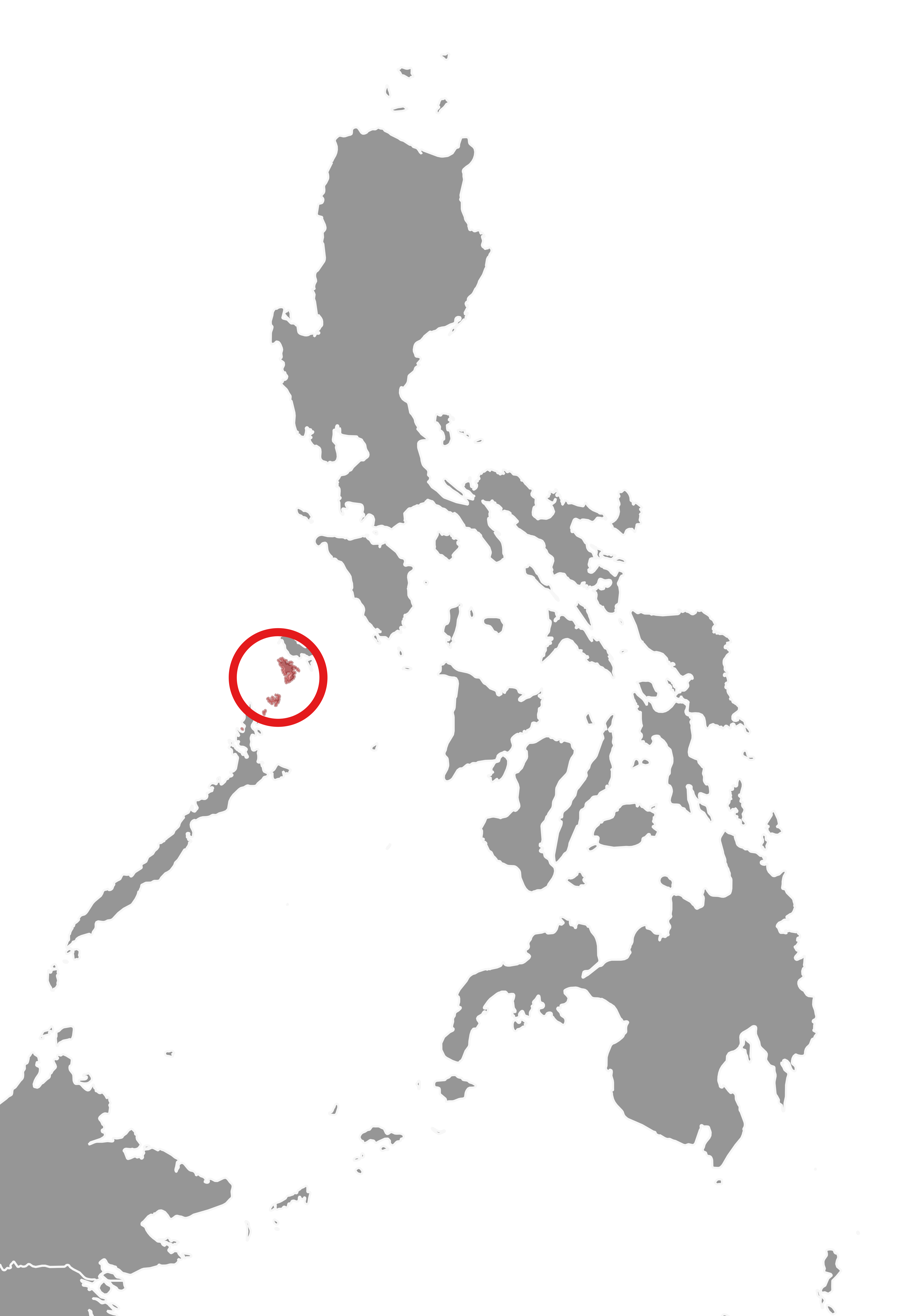

Species of rodent

The Culion tree squirrel (Sundasciurus moellendorffi) is a species of rodent in the family Sciuridae. It is endemic to the Philippines. Its natural habitat is subtropical or tropical dry forests.
