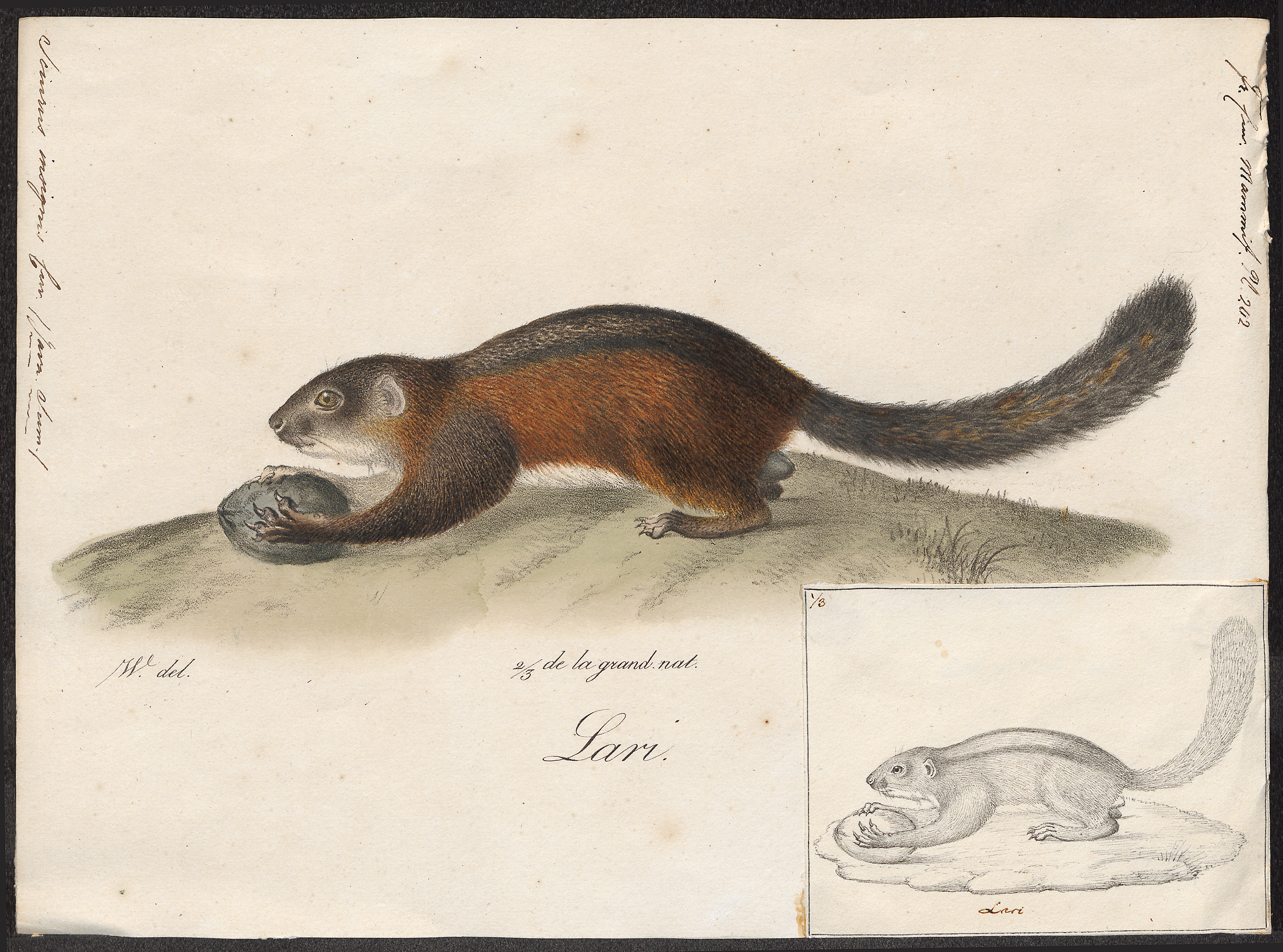
- Lariscus insignis

Scientific classification
- Kingdom: Animalia
- Phylum: Chordata
- Class: Mammalia
- Order: Rodentia
- Family: Sciuridae
- Subfamily: Callosciurinae
- Genus: Lariscus; Thomas & Wroughton, 1909

Type species
- Sciurus insignia F. Cuvier, 1821

Species
- L. hosei (Thomas, 1892); L. insignis (F. Cuvier, 1821); L. niobe (Thomas, 1898); L. obscurus (Miller, 1903)

= Lariscus =

Genus of rodents

Lariscus is a genus of squirrels in the subfamily Callosciurinae. They are only found in Southeast Asia. Species in this genus include:

- The four-striped ground squirrel (L. hosei, syn. Sciurus hosei), endemic to Borneo, its natural habitat is subtropical or tropical dry forests. It is listed as "near threatened" by the IUCN Red List due to habitat loss.
- The three-striped ground squirrel (L. insignis), found in Indonesia, Malaysia, and Thailand. Listed as "least concern" by the IUCN.
- The Niobe ground squirrel (L. niobe), like L. obscuris, lives in the subtropical and tropical forests of Indonesia, but the IUCN does not have enough data to make a definite status determination.
- The Mentawai three-striped squirrel (L. obscurus), endemic to Indonesia, also lives in subtropical or tropical dry forests, and is listed as "near threatened" by the IUCN due to habitat loss.
