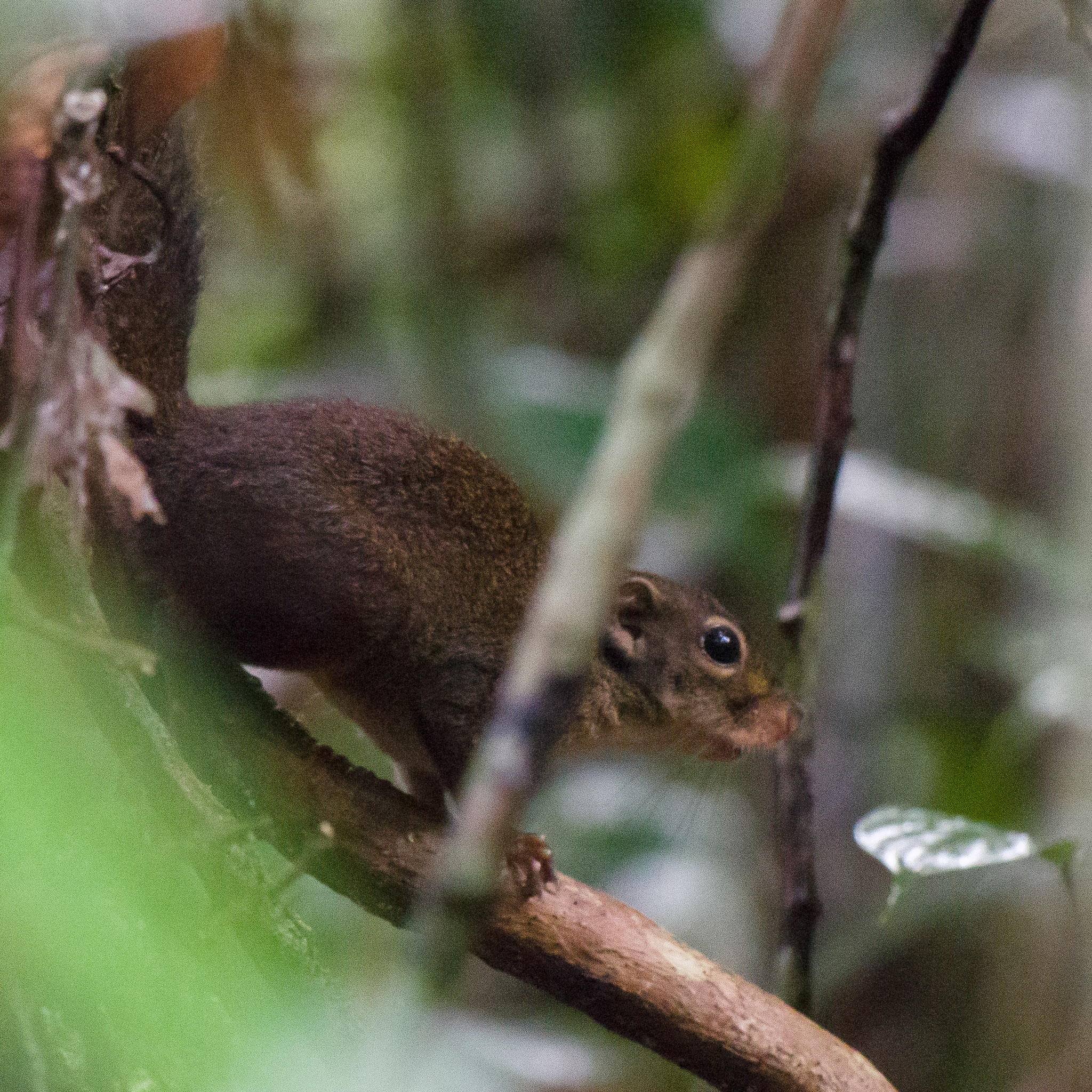

Conservation status
- Least Concern (IUCN 3.1)

Scientific classification
- Kingdom: Animalia
- Phylum: Chordata
- Class: Mammalia
- Order: Rodentia
- Family: Sciuridae
- Genus: Sundasciurus
- Species: S. lowii

Binomial name
- Sundasciurus lowii (Thomas, 1892)

Subspecies
- S. l. lowii; S. l. bangueyae; S. l. lingungensis
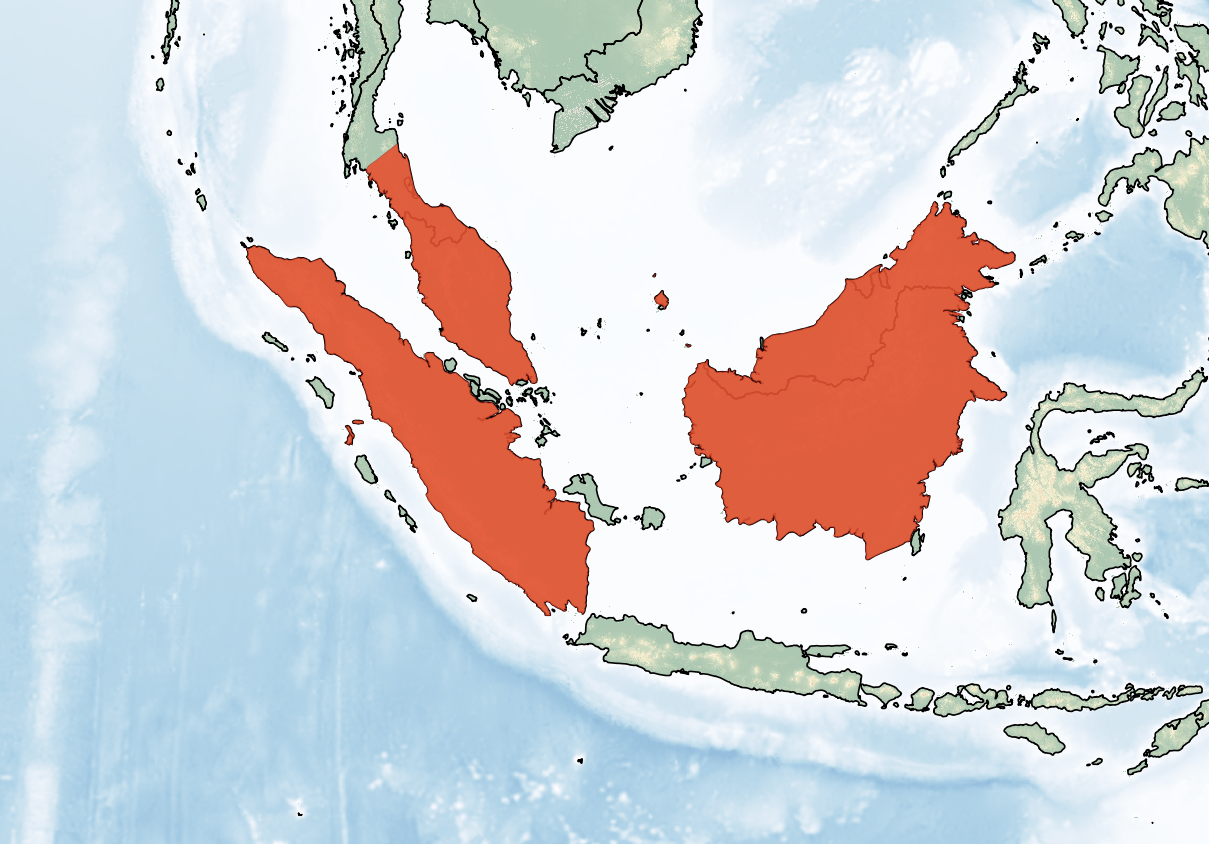

= Low's squirrel =

Species of rodent

Low's squirrel (Sundasciurus lowii) is a species of rodent in the family Sciuridae. It is found in Borneo and nearby islets (Indonesia and Malaysia). Its former subspecies S. l. robinsoni from Sumatra and the Malay Peninsula and S. l. natunensis from the Natuna islands have recently been given species status.
