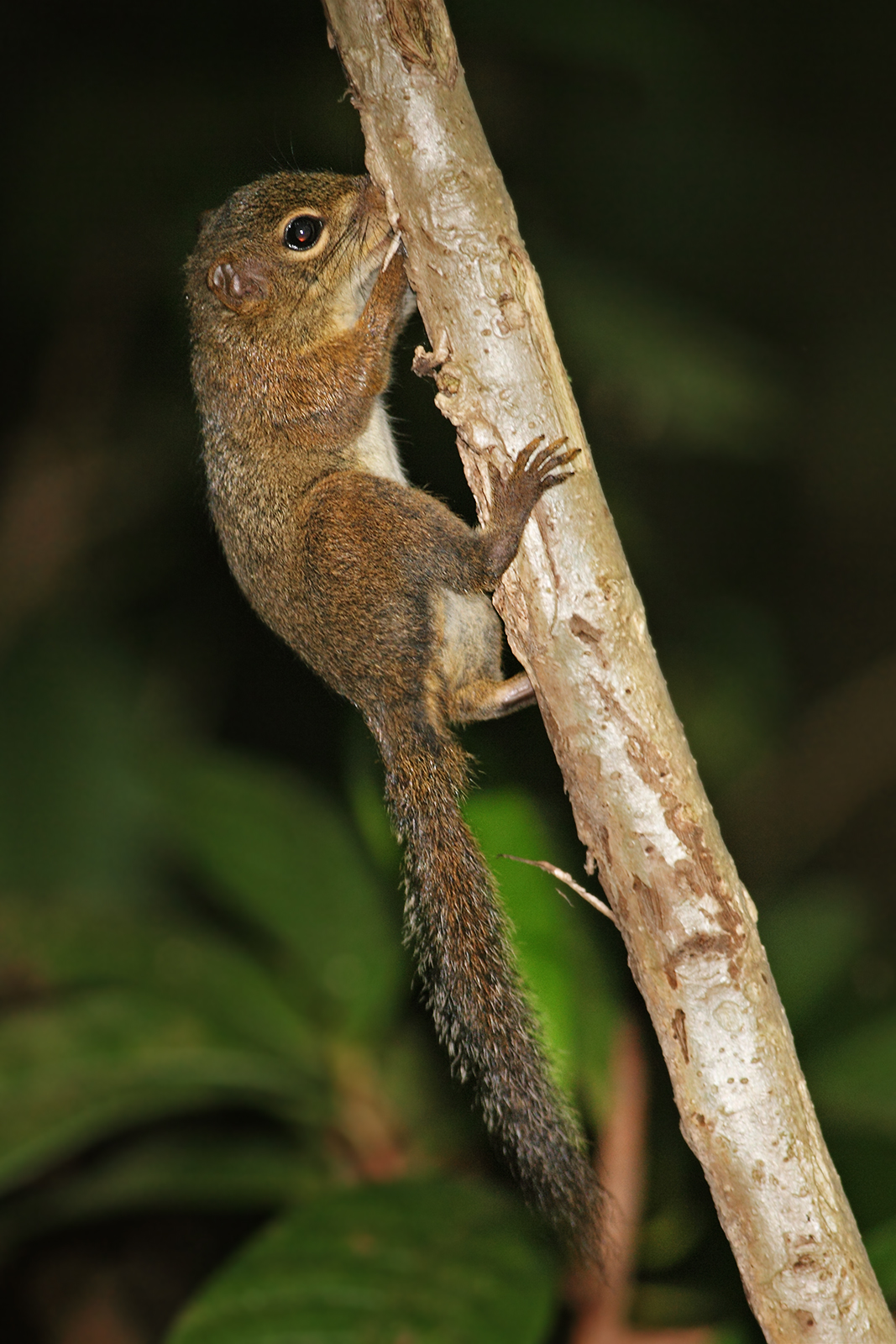
- Slender Squirrel

Scientific classification
- Kingdom: Animalia
- Phylum: Chordata
- Class: Mammalia
- Order: Rodentia
- Family: Sciuridae
- Genus: Sundasciurus
- Species: S. tahan

Binomial name
- Sundasciurus tahan (Bonhote, 1908)

= Upland squirrel =

Species of rodent

The upland squirrel (Sundasciurus tahan), also known as the mountain slender squirrel, is a species of rodent in the family Sciuridae. Native to Peninsular Malaysia, it inhabits montane and lower montane forests including portions of the Titiwangsa Mountains and Gunung Tahan.
