= Fraternal squirrel =

Conservation status
- Vulnerable (IUCN 3.1)

Scientific classification
- Kingdom: Animalia
- Phylum: Chordata
- Class: Mammalia
- Order: Rodentia
- Family: Sciuridae
- Genus: Sundasciurus
- Species: S. fraterculus

Binomial name
- Sundasciurus fraterculus (Thomas, 1895)

Species of rodent

The fraternal squirrel (Sundasciurus fraterculus) is a species of rodent in the family Sciuridae. It is endemic to Indonesia, found only in the Mentawai Archipelago (Siberut, Sipora, North and South Pagai islands), located off the west coast of Sumatra.
