= Palawan montane squirrel =

Conservation status
- Data Deficient (IUCN 3.1)

Scientific classification
- Kingdom: Animalia
- Phylum: Chordata
- Class: Mammalia
- Order: Rodentia
- Family: Sciuridae
- Genus: Sundasciurus
- Species: S. rabori

Binomial name
- Sundasciurus rabori Heaney, 1979
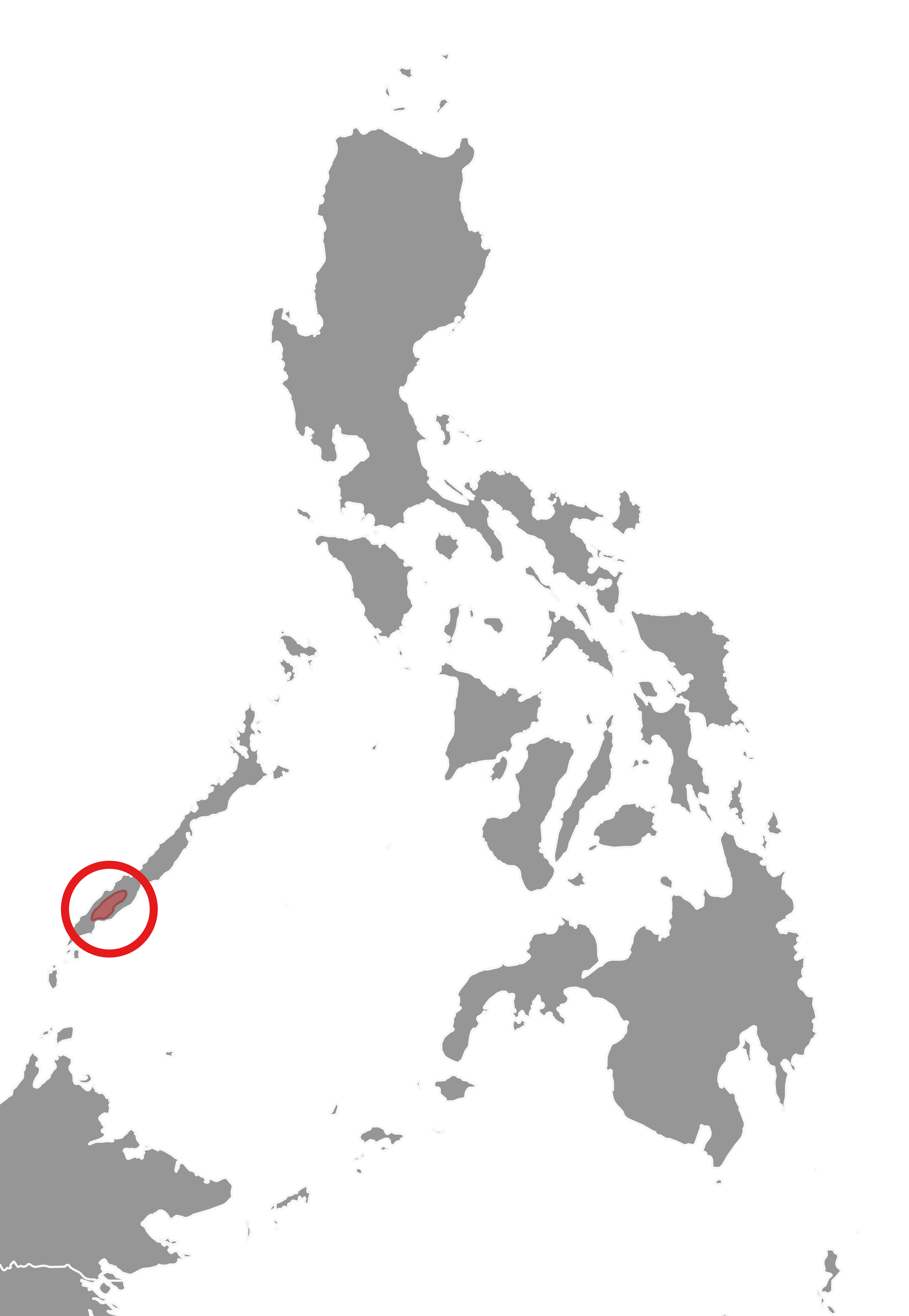

Species of rodent

The Palawan montane squirrel (Sundasciurus rabori) is a species of rodent in the family Sciuridae. It is endemic to the Philippines. Its natural habitat is subtropical or tropical dry forests.
