= List of mammals of Malaysia =

This is a list of the mammal species recorded in Malaysia. There are 313 mammal species in Malaysia, of which six are critically endangered, seventeen are endangered, twenty-eight are vulnerable, and one is near threatened. Every mammal in Malaysia belongs to the subclass Theria, and the infraclass Eutheria, as all are placental mammals. They are listed below by the order which they belong to.

The following tags are used to highlight each species' conservation status as assessed by the International Union for Conservation of Nature:

EX	Extinct	No reasonable doubt that the last individual has died.
EW	Extinct in the wild	Known only to survive in captivity or as a naturalized populations well outside its previous range.
CR	Critically endangered	The species is in imminent risk of extinction in the wild.
EN	Endangered	The species is facing an extremely high risk of extinction in the wild.
VU	Vulnerable	The species is facing a high risk of extinction in the wild.
NT	Near threatened	The species does not meet any of the criteria that would categorise it as risking extinction but it is likely to do so in the future.
LC	Least concern	There are no current identifiable risks to the species.
DD	Data deficient	There is inadequate information to make an assessment of the risks to this species.

== Proboscidea (elephants) ==
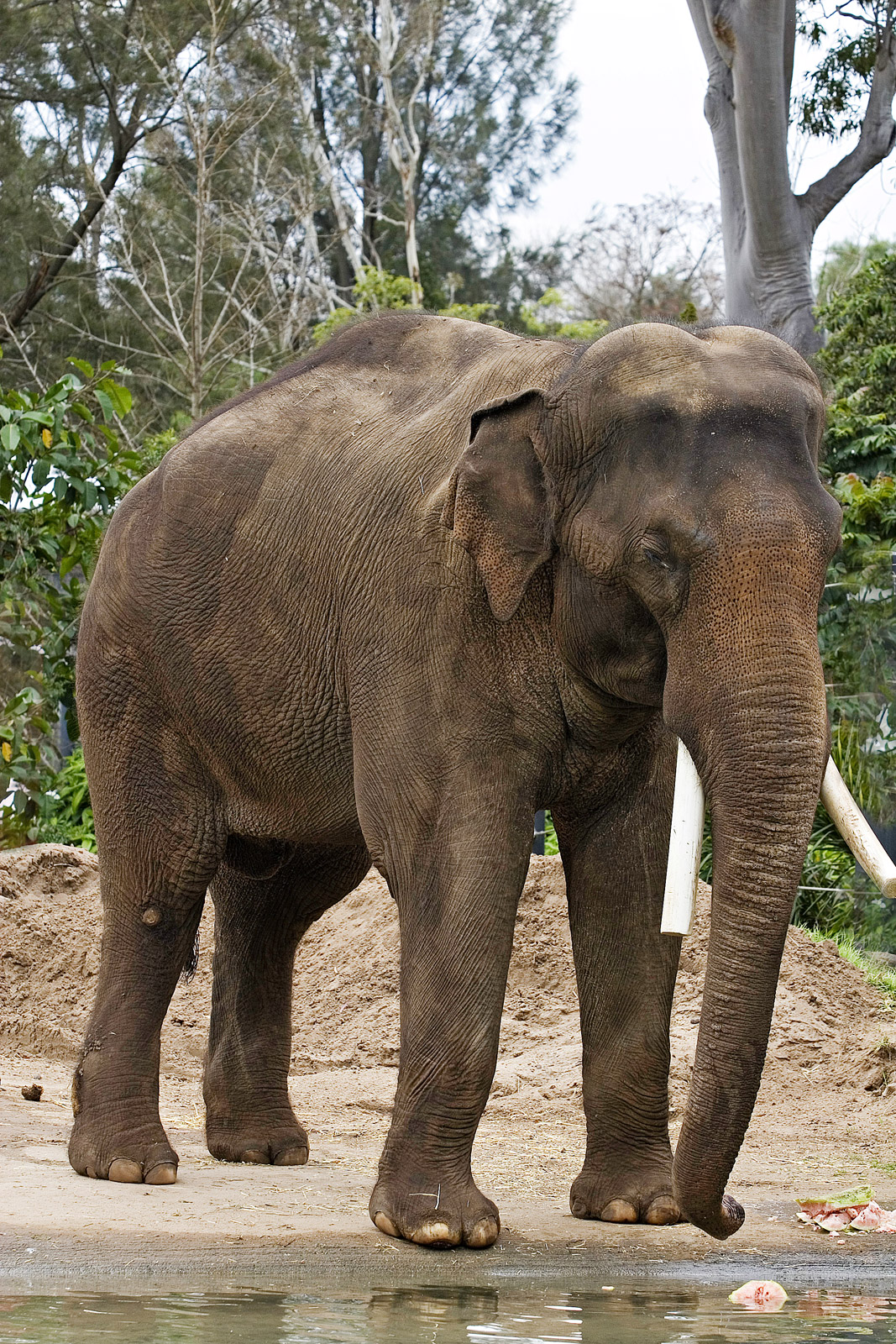
Asian elephant

The elephants comprise three living species and are the largest living land animals.

- Family: Elephantidae (elephants)
  - Genus: Elephas
    - Asian elephant, E. maximus EN

== Sirenia (manatees and dugongs) ==
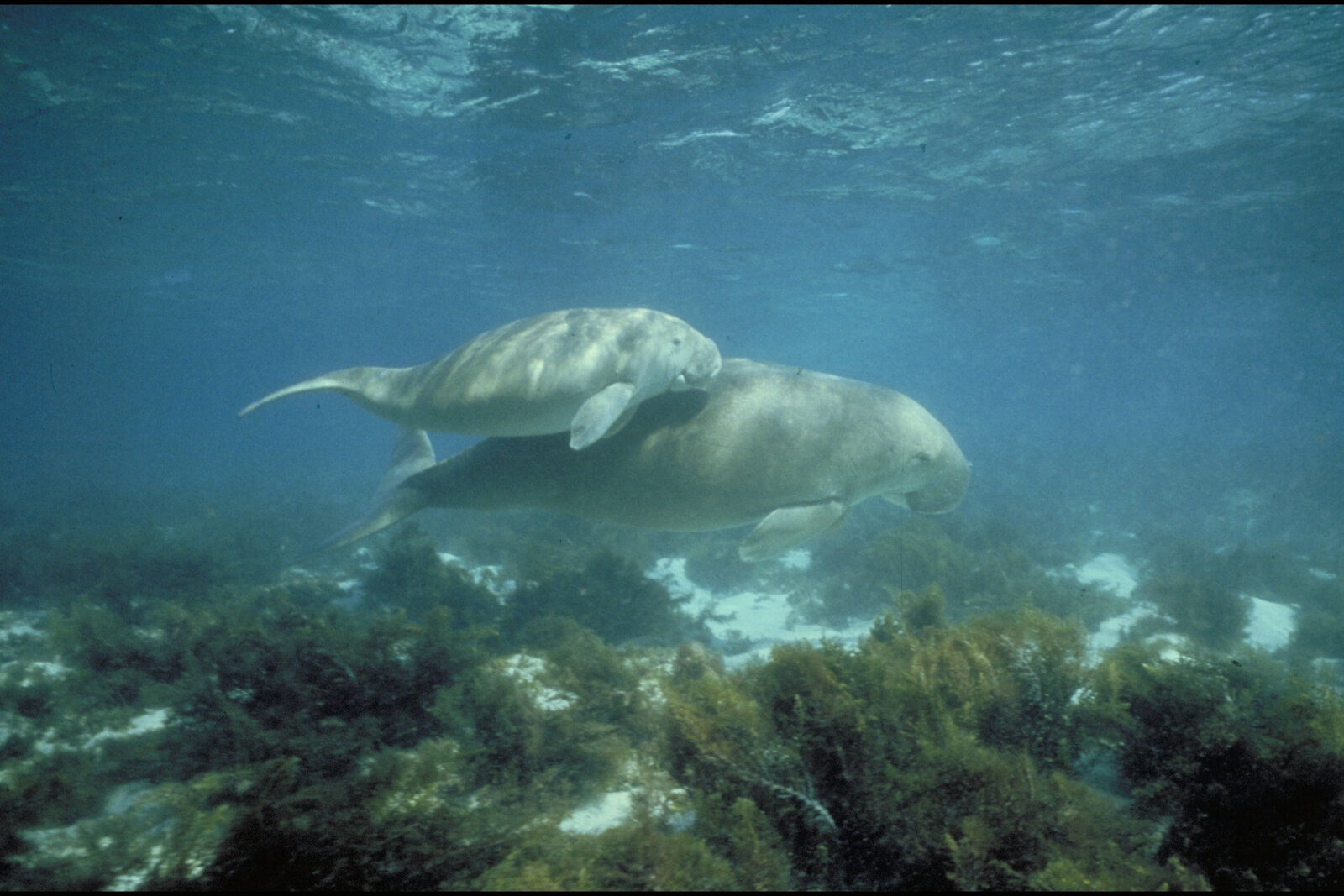
Dugongs

Sirenia is an order of fully aquatic, herbivorous mammals that inhabit rivers, estuaries, coastal marine waters, swamps, and marine wetlands. All four species are endangered.

- Family: Dugongidae
  - Genus: Dugong
    - Dugong, D. dugon VU

== Scandentia (treeshrews) ==
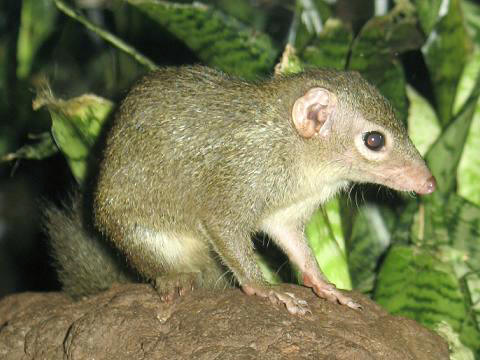
Common treeshrew

The treeshrews are small mammals native to the tropical forests of Southeast Asia. Although called treeshrews, they are not true shrews and are not all arboreal.

- Family: Tupaiidae (treeshrews)
  - Genus: Dendrogale
    - Bornean smooth-tailed treeshrew, D. melanura DD
  - Genus: Tupaia
    - Northern treeshrew, T. belangeri LC
    - Striped treeshrew, T. dorsalis DD
    - Common treeshrew, T. glis LC
    - Slender treeshrew, T. gracilis LC
    - Long-footed treeshrew, T. longipes LC
    - Pygmy treeshrew, T. minor LC
    - Mountain treeshrew, T. montana LC
    - Painted treeshrew, T. picta LC
    - Large treeshrew, T. tana LC
- Family: Ptilocercidae
  - Genus: Ptilocercus
    - Pen-tailed treeshrew, P. lowii LC

== Dermoptera (colugos) ==
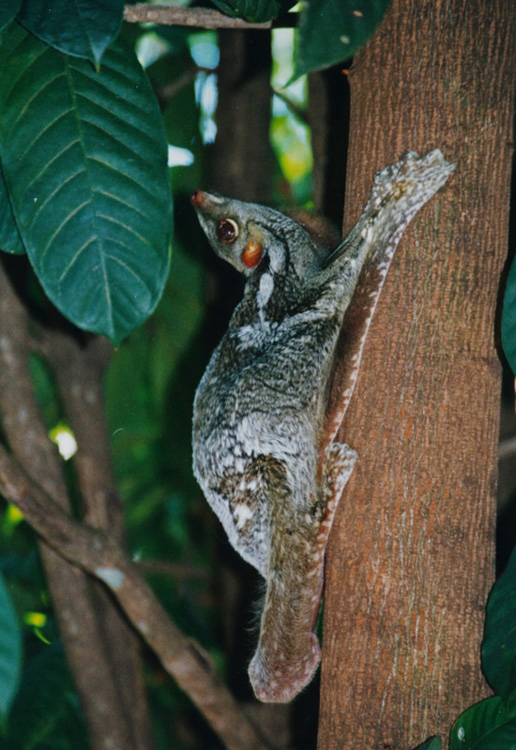
Sunda flying lemur

The two species of colugos make up the order Dermoptera. They are arboreal gliding mammals found in Southeast Asia.

- Family: Cynocephalidae (flying lemurs)
  - Genus: Galeopterus
    - Sunda flying lemur, G. variegatus LC

== Primates ==
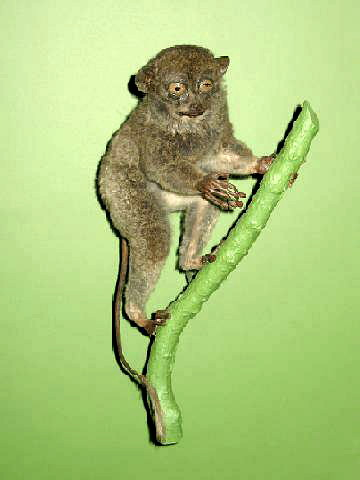
Horsfield's tarsier

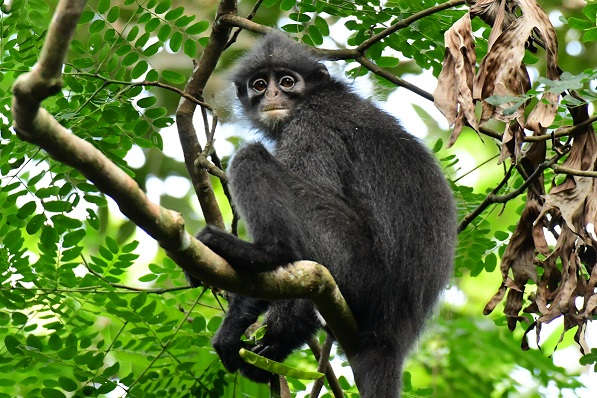
Raffles' banded langur

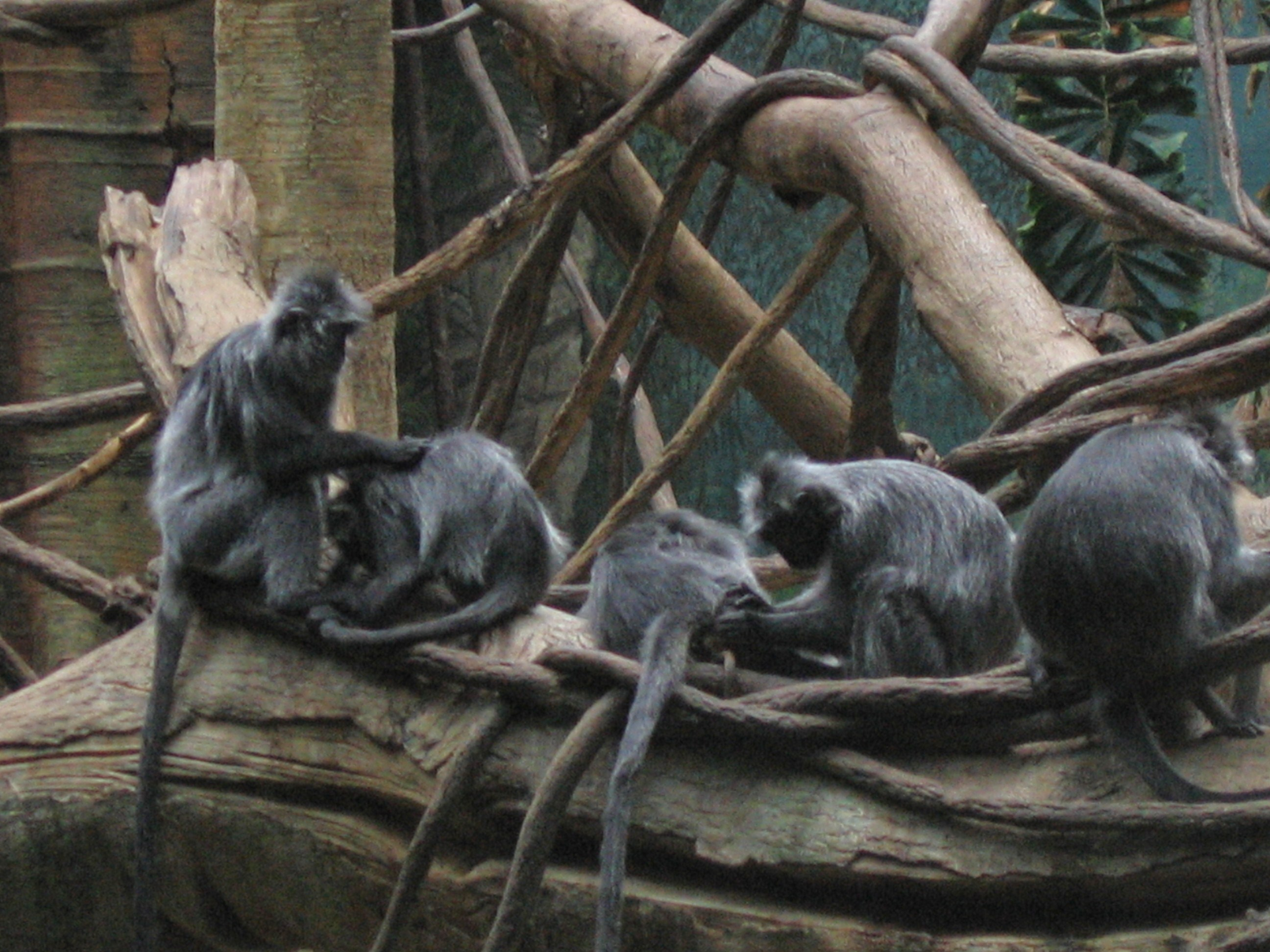
Silvery lutung

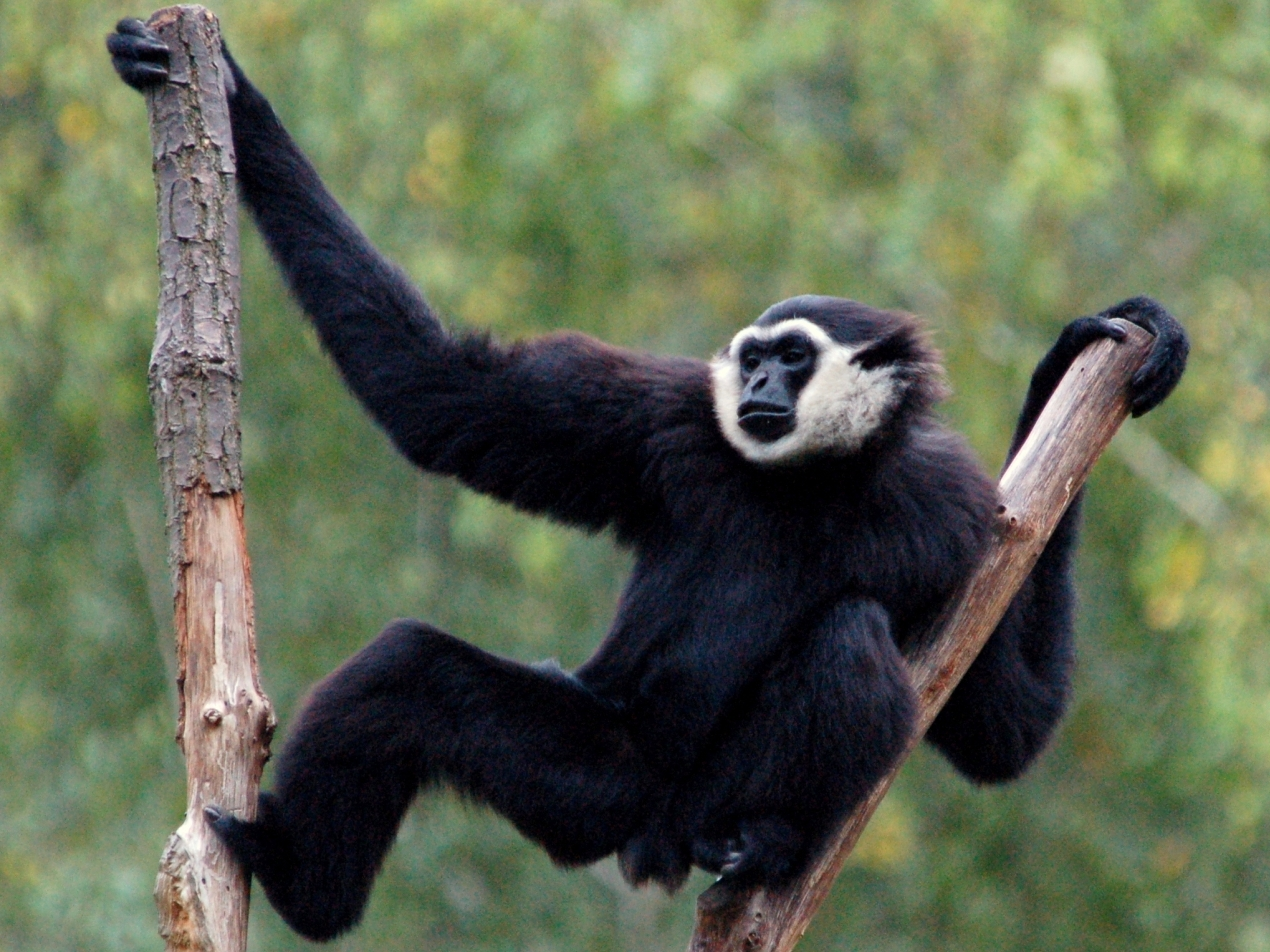
Agile gibbon

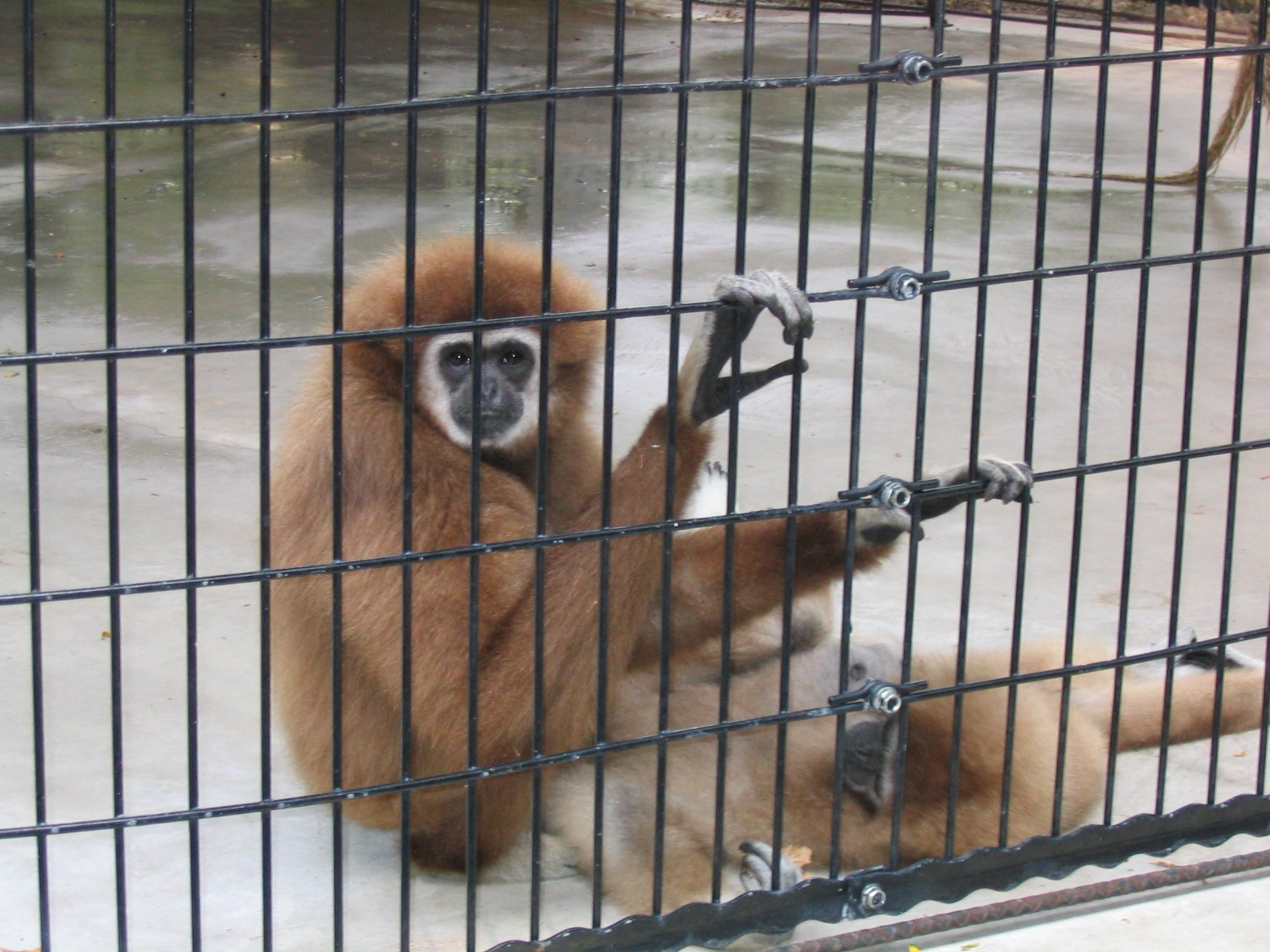
Lar gibbon

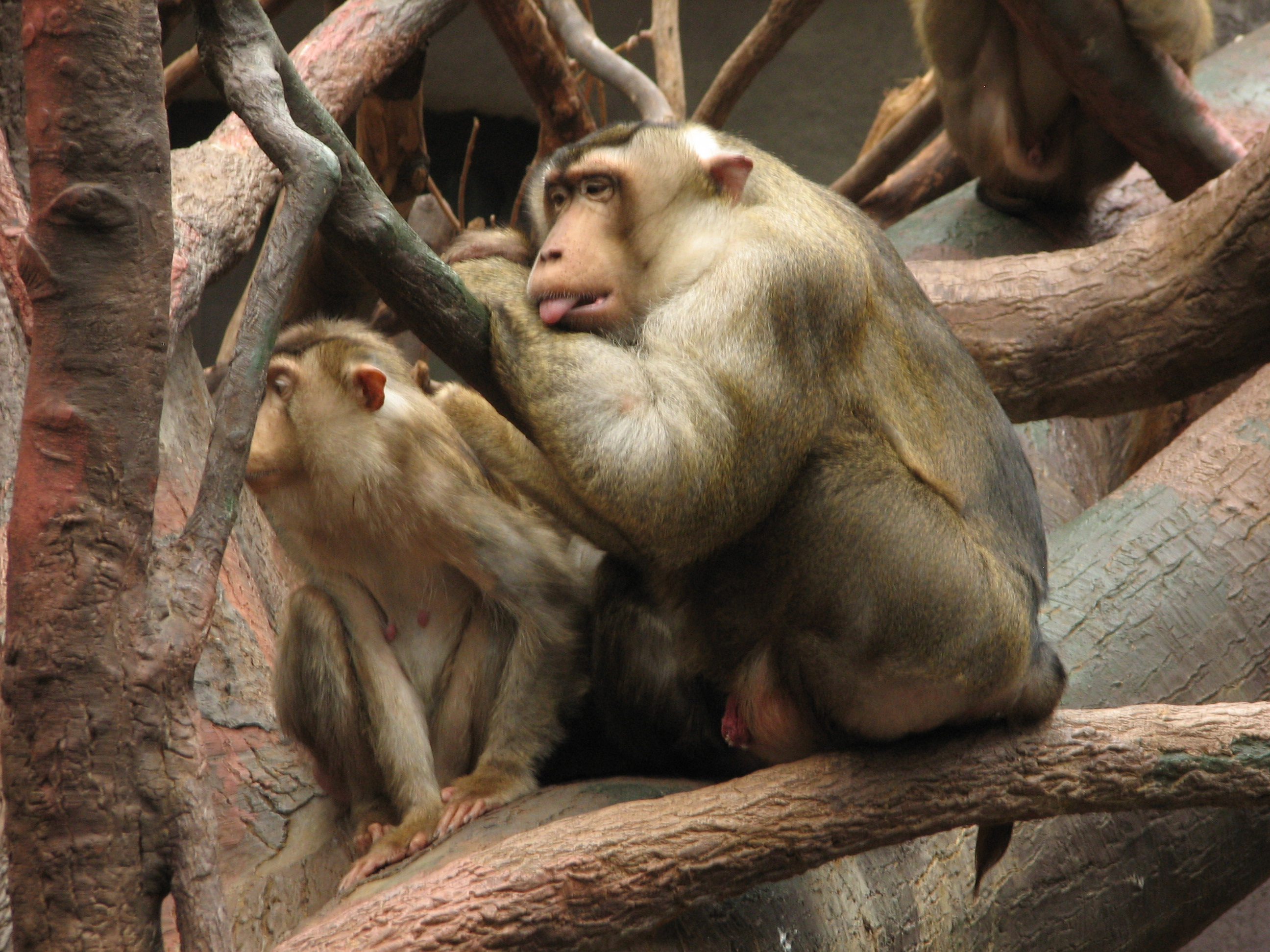
Southern pig-tailed macaque

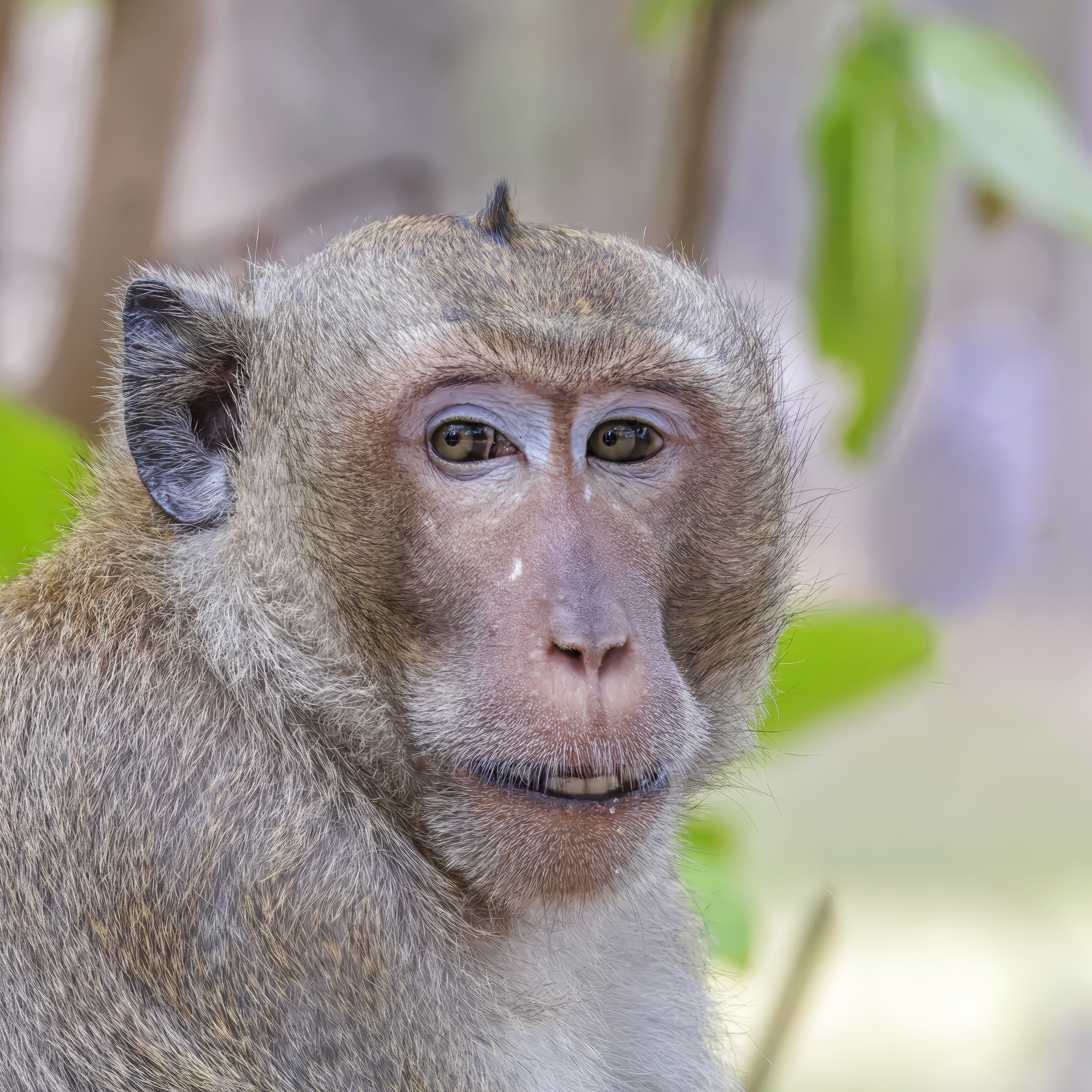
Crab-eating macaque

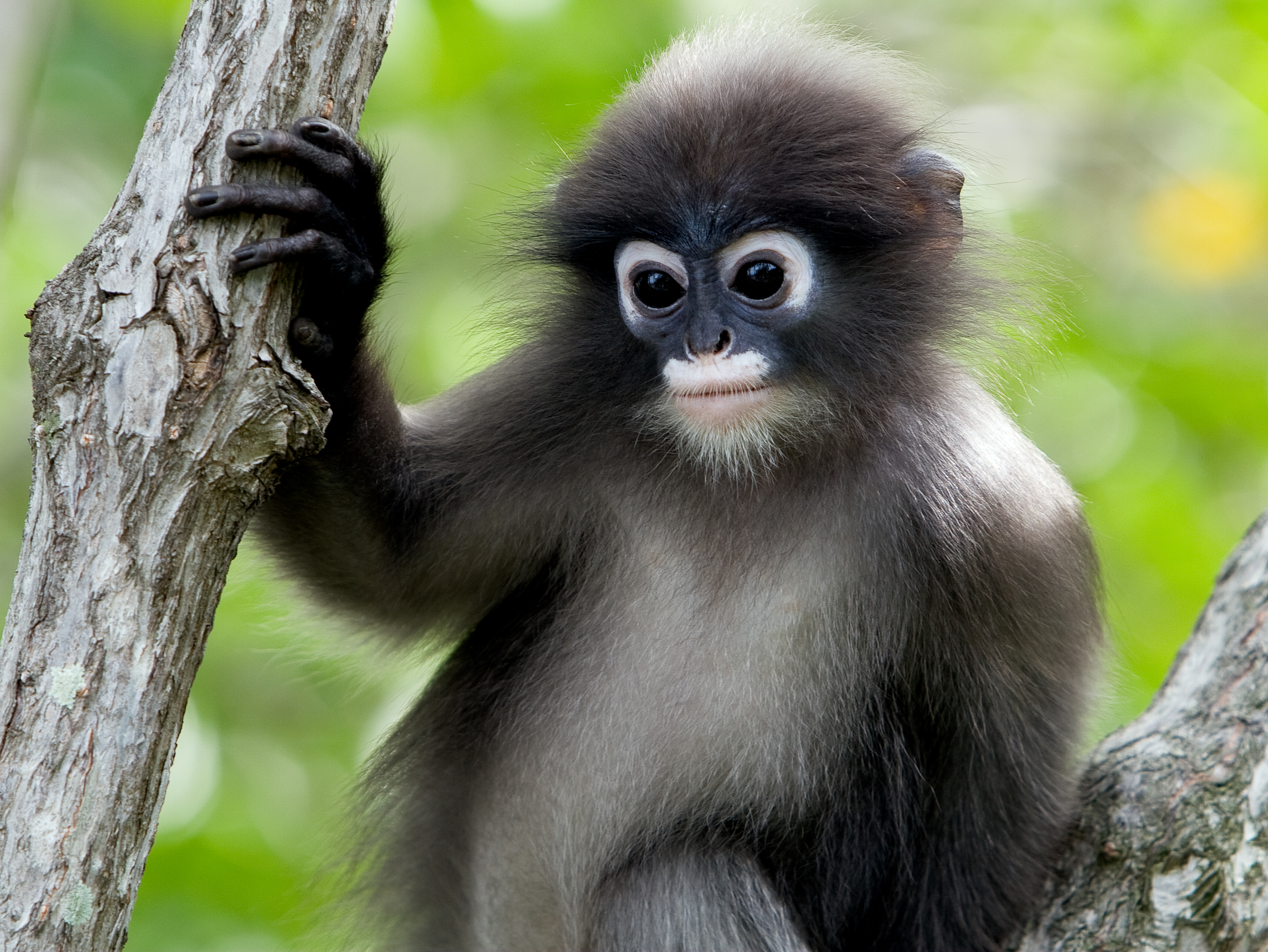
Dusky leaf monkey

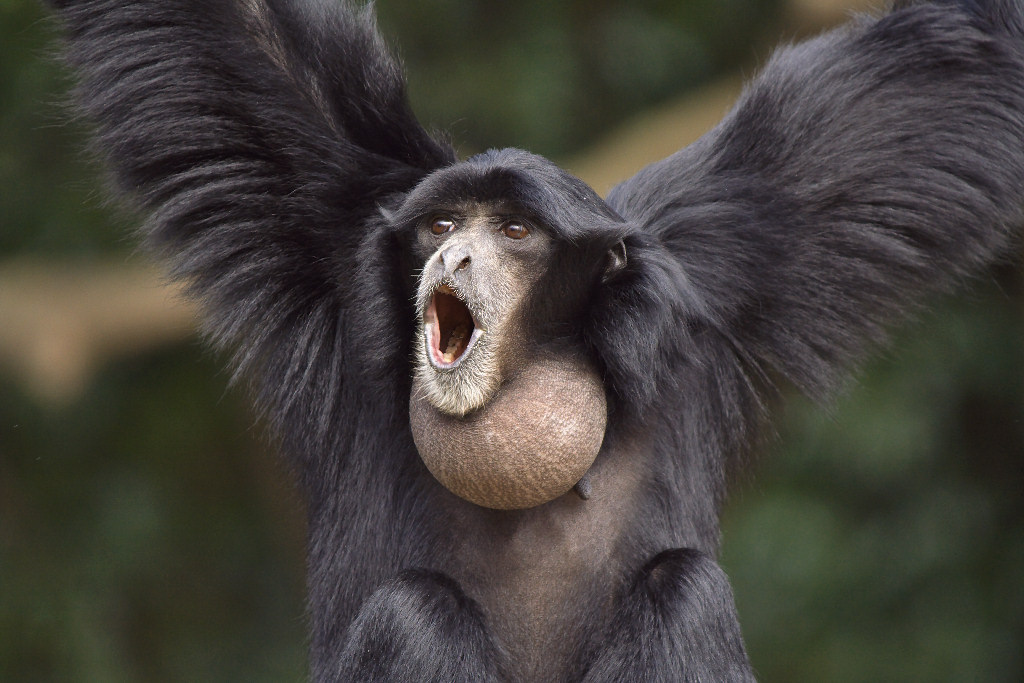
Siamang

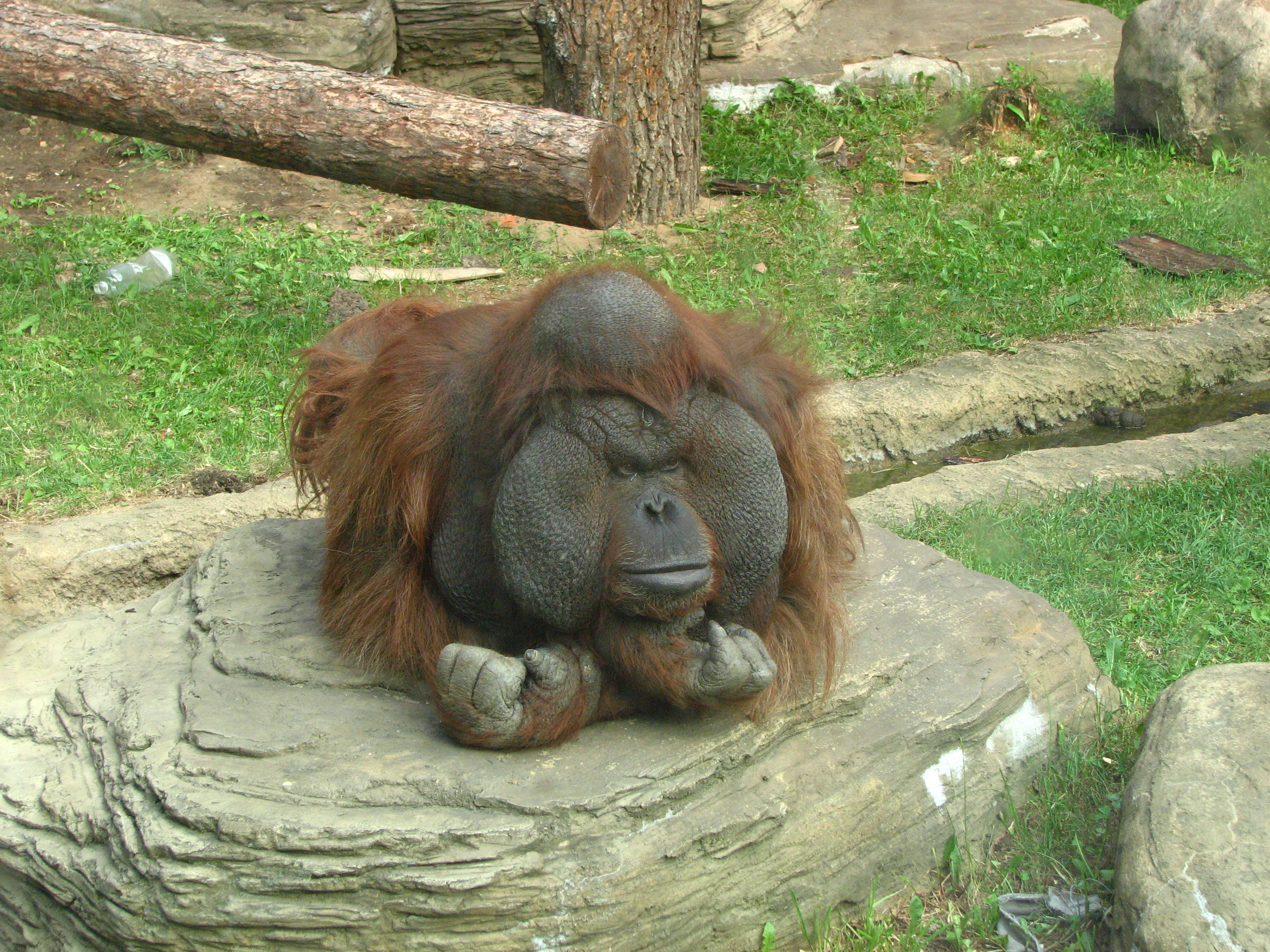
Bornean orangutan

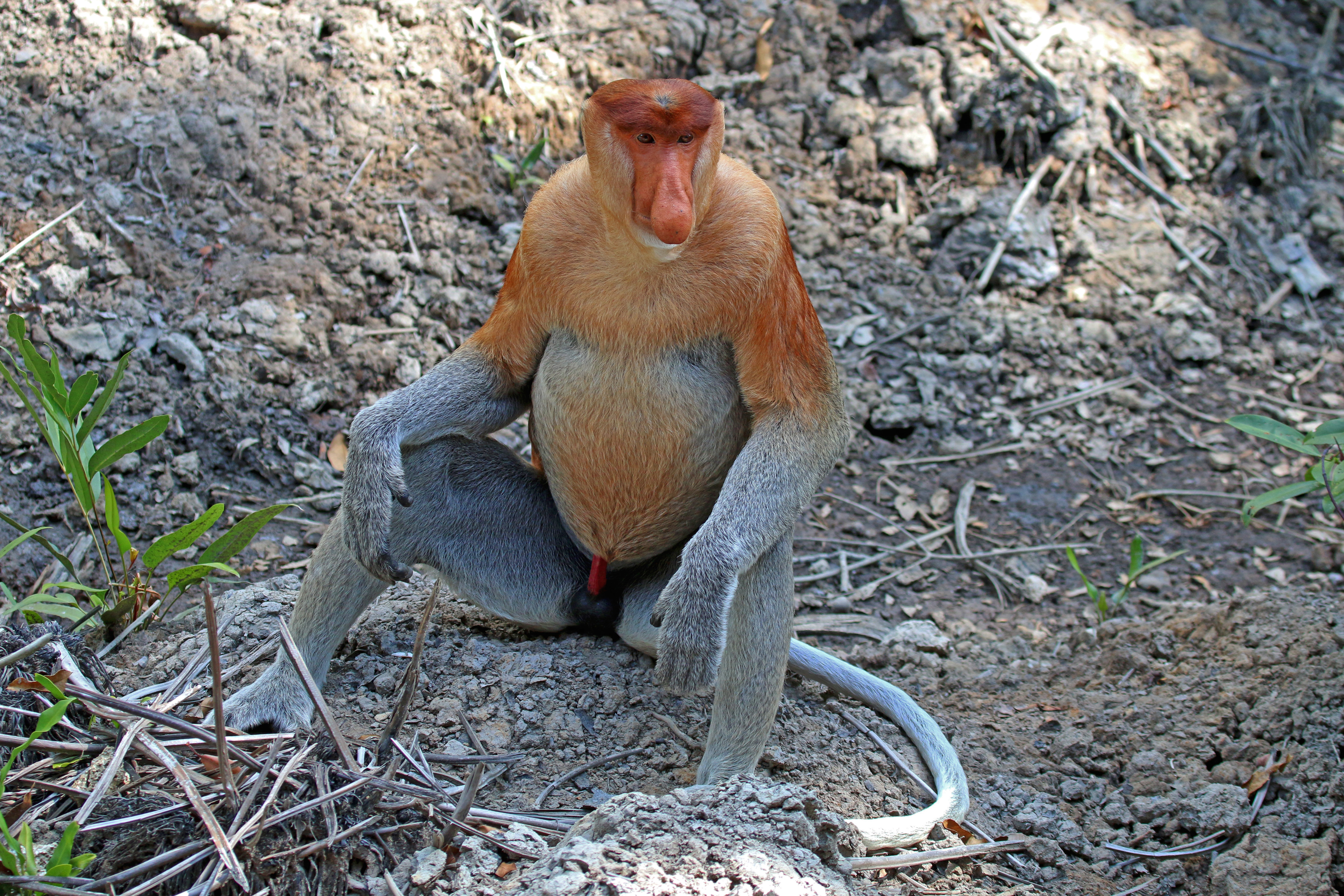
Proboscis monkey

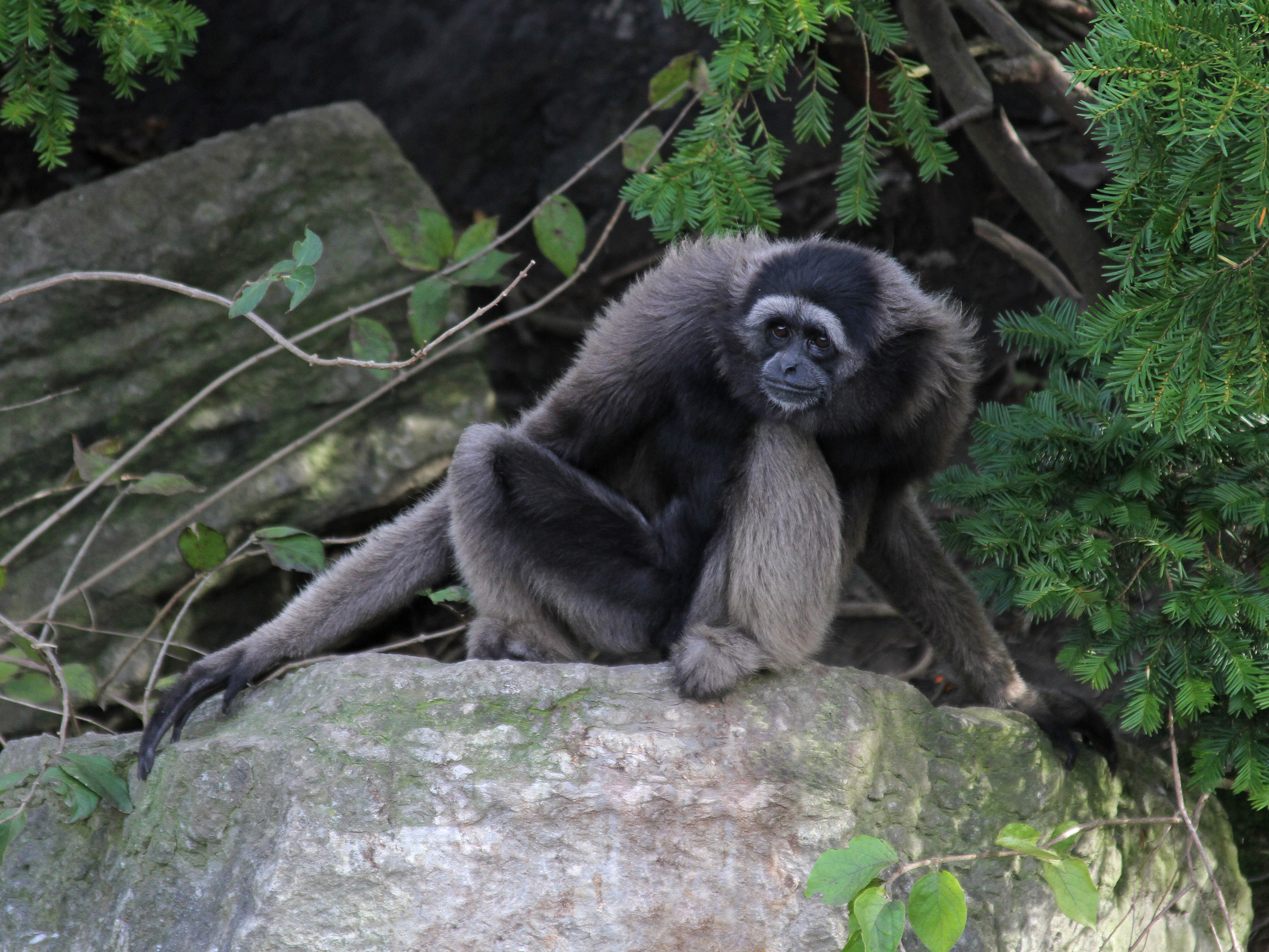
Müller's gibbon

The order Primates contains humans and their closest relatives: lemurs, lorisoids, monkeys, and apes.

- Suborder: Strepsirrhini
  - Infraorder: Lemuriformes
    - Superfamily: Lorisoidea
      - Family: Lorisidae
        - Genus: Nycticebus
          - Sunda slow loris, N. coucang EN
- Suborder: Haplorhini
  - Infraorder: Tarsiiformes
    - Family: Tarsiidae (tarsiers)
      - Genus: Cephalopachus
        - Horsfield's tarsier, C. bancanus VU
  - Infraorder: Simiiformes
    - Parvorder: Catarrhini
      - Superfamily: Cercopithecoidea
        - Family: Cercopithecidae (Old World monkeys)
          - Subfamily: Cercopithecinae
            - Genus: Macaca
              - Stump-tailed macaque, M. arctoides VU
              - Crab-eating macaque, M. fascicularis VU
              - Southern pig-tailed macaque, M. nemestrina VU
          - Subfamily: Colobinae
            - Genus: Nasalis
              - Proboscis monkey, N. larvatus EN
            - Genus: Presbytis
              - Raffles' banded langur, P. femoralis VU
              - White-faced surili, P. frontata DD
              - Hose's langur, P. hosei DD
              - Robinson's banded langur, P. robinsoni NT
              - Maroon leaf monkey, P. rubicunda VU
              - Saban grizzled langur, P. sabana EN
              - White-thighed surili, P. siamensis DD
            - Genus: Trachypithecus
              - Dusky leaf monkey, T. obscurus EN
              - Silvery lutung, T. cristatus NT
              - Selangor silvered langur, T. selangorensis
      - Superfamily: Hominoidea
        - Family: Hylobatidae (gibbons)
          - Genus: Hylobates
            - Agile gibbon, H. agilis EN
            - Lar gibbon, H. lar EN
            - Müller's gibbon, H. muelleri EN
          - Genus: Symphalangus
            - Siamang, S. syndactylus EN
        - Family: Hominidae
          - Subfamily: Ponginae
            - Genus: Pongo
              - Bornean orangutan, P. pygmaeus EN

== Rodentia (rodents) ==
Rodents make up the largest order of mammals, with over 40% of mammalian species. They have two incisors in the upper and lower jaw which grow continually and must be kept short by gnawing. Most rodents are small though the capybara can weigh up to 45 kg (99 lb).

- Infraorder: Hystricognathi
  - Family: Hystricidae (Old World porcupines)
    - Genus: Atherurus
      - Asiatic brush-tailed porcupine, A. macrourus LC
    - Genus: Hystrix
      - Malayan porcupine, H. brachyura LC
      - Thick-spined porcupine, H. crassispinis NT
    - Genus: Trichys
      - Long-tailed porcupine, T. fasciculata LC
- Infraorder: Sciurognathi
  - Family: Sciuridae (squirrels)
    - Subfamily: Ratufinae
      - Genus: Ratufa
        - Cream-coloured giant squirrel, R. affinis NT
        - Black giant squirrel, R. bicolor NT
    - Subfamily: Sciurinae
      - Tribe: Sciurini
        - Genus: Rheithrosciurus
          - Tufted ground squirrel, Rheithrosciurus macrotis
      - Tribe: Pteromyini
        - Genus: Aeromys
          - Black flying squirrel, Aeromys tephromelas
          - Thomas's flying squirrel, Aeromys thomasi
        - Genus: Hylopetes
          - Grey-cheeked flying squirrel, Hylopetes lepidus
          - Red-cheeked flying squirrel, Hylopetes spadiceus
        - Genus: Iomys
          - Javanese flying squirrel, Iomys horsfieldi
        - Genus: Petaurillus
          - Lesser pygmy flying squirrel, Petaurillus emiliae
          - Hose's pygmy flying squirrel, Petaurillus hosei
          - Selangor pygmy flying squirrel, Petaurillus kinlochii
        - Genus: Petaurista
          - Spotted giant flying squirrel, Petaurista elegans
          - Red giant flying squirrel, Petaurista petaurista
        - Genus: Petinomys
          - Whiskered flying squirrel, Petinomys genibarbis
          - Temminck's flying squirrel, Petinomys setosus
          - Vordermann's flying squirrel, Petinomys vordermanni
        - Genus: Pteromyscus
          - Smoky flying squirrel, Pteromyscus pulverulentus
    - Subfamily: Callosciurinae
      - Genus: Callosciurus
        - Ear-spot squirrel, Callosciurus adamsi
        - Kinabalu squirrel, Callosciurus baluensis
        - Grey-bellied squirrel, Callosciurus caniceps
        - Pallas's squirrel, Callosciurus erythraeus
        - Black-striped squirrel, Callosciurus nigrovittatus
        - Plantain squirrel, Callosciurus notatus
        - Borneo black-banded squirrel, Callosciurus orestes
        - Prevost's squirrel, Callosciurus prevostii
      - Genus: Dremomys
        - Bornean mountain ground squirrel, Sundasciurus everetti
        - Asian red-cheeked squirrel, Dremomys rufigenis
      - Genus: Exilisciurus
        - Least pygmy squirrel, Exilisciurus exilis
        - Tufted pygmy squirrel, Exilisciurus whiteheadi
      - Genus: Glyphotes
        - Sculptor squirrel, Glyphotes simus
      - Genus: Lariscus
        - Four-striped ground squirrel, Lariscus hosei VU
        - Three-striped ground squirrel, Lariscus insignis
      - Genus: Nannosciurus
        - Black-eared squirrel, Nannosciurus melanotis
      - Genus: Rhinosciurus
        - Shrew-faced squirrel, Rhinosciurus laticaudatus
      - Genus: Sundasciurus
        - Brooke's squirrel, Sundasciurus brookei
        - Horse-tailed squirrel, Sundasciurus hippurus
        - Jentink's squirrel, Sundasciurus jentinki VU
        - Low's squirrel, Sundasciurus lowii
        - Robinson's squirrel, Sundasciurus robinsoni
        - Upland squirrel, Sundasciurus tahan
        - Slender squirrel, Sundasciurus tenuis
      - Genus: Tamiops
        - Himalayan striped squirrel, Tamiops macclellandi
  - Family: Spalacidae
    - Subfamily: Rhizomyinae
      - Genus: Rhizomys
        - Hoary bamboo rat, Rhizomys pruinosus
        - Large bamboo rat, Rhizomys sumatrensis
  - Family: Muridae (mice, rats, voles, gerbils, hamsters)
    - Subfamily: Murinae
      - Genus: Berylmys
        - Bower's white-toothed rat, Berylmys bowersi
      - Genus: Chiropodomys
        - Indomalayan pencil-tailed tree mouse, Chiropodomys gliroides
        - Large pencil-tailed tree mouse, Chiropodomys major
        - Grey-bellied pencil-tailed tree mouse, Chiropodomys muroides
        - Small pencil-tailed tree mouse, Chiropodomys pusillus
      - Genus: Haeromys
        - Ranee mouse, Haeromys margarettae VU
        - Lesser ranee mouse, Haeromys pusillus VU
      - Genus: Hapalomys
        - Marmoset rat, Hapalomys longicaudatus
      - Genus: Lenothrix
        - Grey tree rat, Lenothrix canus
      - Genus: Leopoldamys
        - Edwards's long-tailed giant rat, Leopoldamys edwardsi
        - Long-tailed giant rat, Leopoldamys sabanus
      - Genus: Maxomys
        - Mountain spiny rat, Maxomys alticola EN
        - Small spiny rat, Maxomys baeodon DD
        - Malayan mountain spiny rat, Maxomys inas
        - Chestnut-bellied spiny rat, Maxomys ochraceiventer
        - Rajah spiny rat, Maxomys rajah
        - Red spiny rat, Maxomys surifer
        - Whitehead's spiny rat, Maxomys whiteheadi
      - Genus: Mus
        - Ryukyu mouse, Mus caroli
      - Genus: Niviventer
        - Dark-tailed tree rat, Niviventer cremoriventer
        - Chestnut white-bellied rat, Niviventer fulvescens
        - Long-tailed mountain rat, Niviventer rapit
      - Genus: Pithecheir
        - Malayan tree rat, Pithecheir parvus
      - Genus: Rattus
        - Brown rat, R. norvegicus LC introduced
        - Annandale's rat, Rattus annandalei
        - Ricefield rat, Rattus argentiventer
        - Summit rat, Rattus baluensis EN
        - Timor rat, Rattus timorensis DD
        - Malayan field rat, Rattus tiomanicus
      - Genus: Sundamys
        - Mountain giant Sunda rat, Sundamys infraluteus
        - Müller's giant Sunda rat, Sundamys muelleri

== Eulipotyphla (shrews, moles, and hedgehogs) ==
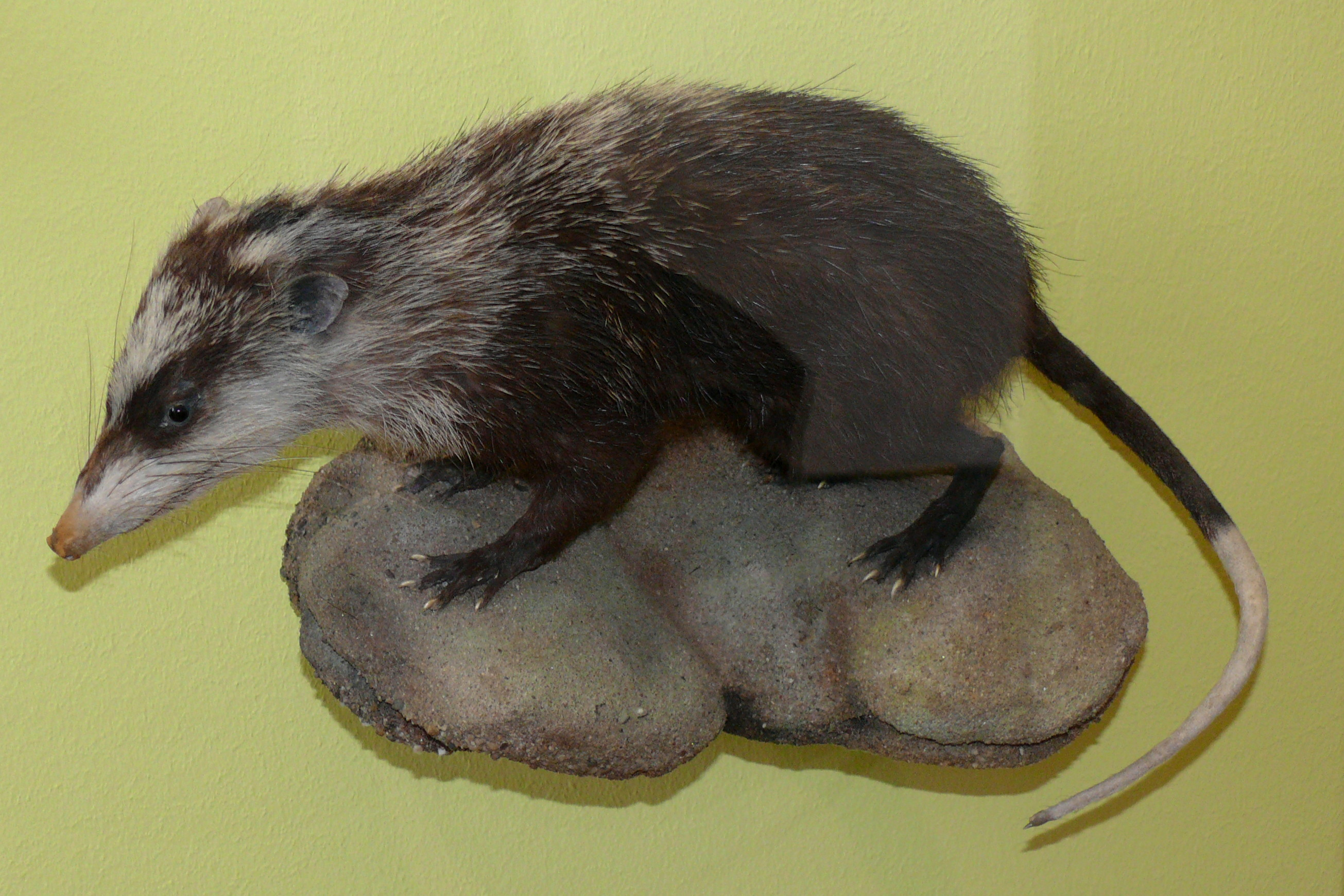
Moonrat

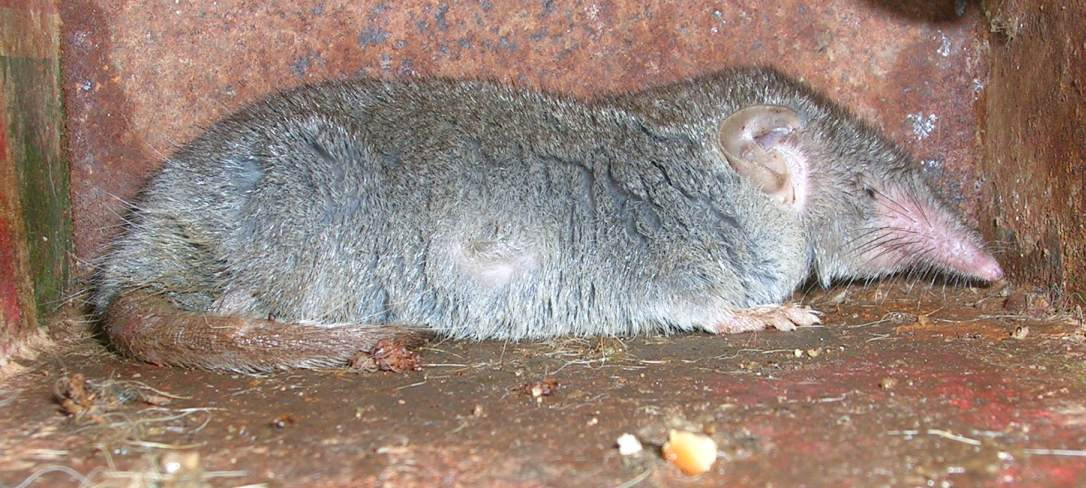
Asian house shrew

The "shrew-forms" are insectivorous mammals. The shrews and solenodons closely resemble mice while the moles are stout-bodied burrowers. The hedgehogs are easily recognised by their spines while gymnures look more like large rats.

- Family: Erinaceidae (hedgehogs)
  - Subfamily: Galericinae
    - Genus: Echinosorex
      - Moonrat, E. gymnura LC
    - Genus: Hylomys
      - Bornean short-tailed gymnure, H. dorsalis
      - Max's short-tailed gymnure, H. maxi
      - Northern short-tailed gymnure, H. peguensis
- Family: Soricidae (shrews)
  - Subfamily: Crocidurinae
    - Genus: Crocidura
      - Grey shrew, C. attenuata LC
      - Southeast Asian shrew, C. fuliginosa LC
      - Malayan shrew, C. malayana LC
      - Sunda shrew, C. monticola LC
    - Genus: Suncus
      - Black shrew, S. ater DD
      - Etruscan shrew, S. etruscus LC
      - Bornean pygmy shrew, S. hosei VU
      - Malayan pygmy shrew, S. malayanus DD
      - Asian house shrew, S. murinus LC
  - Subfamily: Soricinae
    - Tribe: Nectogalini
      - Genus: Chimarrogale
        - Malayan water shrew, C. hantu NT
        - Sunda water shrew, C. phaeura EN
- Family: Talpidae (moles)
  - Subfamily: Talpinae
    - Tribe: Talpini
      - Genus: Euroscaptor
        - Malaysian mole, E. malayana

== Chiroptera (bats) ==
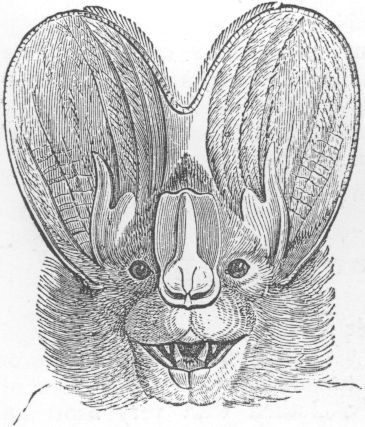
Greater false vampire bat

The bats' most distinguishing feature is that their forelimbs are developed as wings, making them the only mammals capable of flight. Bat species account for about 20% of all mammals.

- Family: Pteropodidae (flying foxes, Old World fruit bats)
  - Subfamily: Pteropodinae
    - Genus: Aethalops
      - Pygmy fruit bat, Aethalops alecto
    - Genus: Balionycteris
      - Spotted-winged fruit bat, Balionycteris maculata
    - Genus: Chironax
      - Black-capped fruit bat, Chironax melanocephalus
    - Genus: Cynopterus
      - Lesser short-nosed fruit bat, C. brachyotis LC
      - Horsfield's fruit bat, Cynopterus horsfieldi
      - Greater short-nosed fruit bat, Cynopterus sphinx
    - Genus: Dyacopterus
      - Dayak fruit bat, Dyacopterus spadiceus
    - Genus: Megaerops
      - Tailless fruit bat, Megaerops ecaudatus
      - White-collared fruit bat, Megaerops wetmorei
    - Genus: Penthetor
      - Dusky fruit bat, Penthetor lucasi
    - Genus: Pteropus
      - Small flying fox, Pteropus hypomelanus
      - Large flying fox, Pteropus vampyrus
    - Genus: Rousettus
      - Bare-backed rousette, Rousettus spinalatus VU
  - Subfamily: Macroglossinae
    - Genus: Eonycteris
      - Greater dawn bat, Eonycteris major
      - Lesser dawn bat, Eonycteris spelaea
    - Genus: Macroglossus
      - Long-tongued nectar bat, Macroglossus minimus
      - Long-tongued fruit bat, Macroglossus sobrinus
- Family: Vespertilionidae
  - Subfamily: Kerivoulinae
    - Genus: Kerivoula
      - Flores woolly bat, Kerivoula flora
      - Hardwicke's woolly bat, Kerivoula hardwickii
      - Small woolly bat, Kerivoula intermedia
      - Least woolly bat, Kerivoula minuta
      - Papillose woolly bat, Kerivoula papillosa
      - Clear-winged woolly bat, Kerivoula pellucida
      - Painted bat, Kerivoula picta
      - Whitehead's woolly bat, Kerivoula whiteheadi
    - Genus: Phoniscus
      - Groove-toothed bat, Phoniscus atrox
      - Peters's trumpet-eared bat, Phoniscus jagorii
  - Subfamily: Myotinae
    - Genus: Myotis
      - Large-footed bat, Myotis adversus
      - Hodgson's bat, M. formosus LC
      - Gomantong myotis, Myotis gomantongensis DD
      - Lesser large-footed bat, Myotis hasseltii LC
      - Horsfield's bat, Myotis horsfieldii LC
      - Pallid large-footed myotis, Myotis macrotarsus
      - Burmese whiskered bat, Myotis montivagus
      - Whiskered myotis, Myotis muricola LC
      - Whiskered bat, M. mystacinus LC
      - Ridley's bat, Myotis ridleyi
      - Himalayan whiskered bat, Myotis siligorensis
  - Subfamily: Vespertilioninae
    - Genus: Arielulus
      - Coppery pipistrelle, Arielulus cuprosus VU
      - Social pipistrelle, Arielulus societatis DD
    - Genus: Falsistrellus
      - Peters's pipistrelle, Falsistrellus petersi
    - Genus: Glischropus
      - Common thick-thumbed bat, Glischropus tylopus
    - Genus: Hesperoptenus
      - Blanford's bat, Hesperoptenus blanfordi
      - False serotine bat, Hesperoptenus doriae EN
      - Large false serotine, Hesperoptenus tomesi
    - Genus: Hypsugo
      - Brown pipistrelle, Hypsugo imbricatus
      - Red-brown pipistrelle, Hypsugo kitcheneri
      - Big-eared pipistrelle, Hypsugo macrotis
    - Genus: Nyctalus
      - Common noctule, N. noctula LC
    - Genus: Philetor
      - Rohu's bat, Philetor brachypterus
    - Genus: Pipistrellus
      - Kelaart's pipistrelle, Pipistrellus ceylonicus
      - Java pipistrelle, Pipistrellus javanicus
      - Narrow-winged pipistrelle, Pipistrellus stenopterus
    - Genus: Scotophilus
      - Lesser Asiatic yellow bat, Scotophilus kuhlii
    - Genus: Tylonycteris
      - Lesser bamboo bat, Tylonycteris pachypus
      - Greater bamboo bat, Tylonycteris robustula
  - Subfamily: Murininae
    - Genus: Harpiocephalus
      - Greater hairy-winged bat, Harpiocephalus mordax
    - Genus: Murina
      - Bronze tube-nosed bat, Murina aenea
      - Round-eared tube-nosed bat, Murina cyclotis
      - Hutton's tube-nosed bat, Murina huttoni
      - Gilded tube-nosed bat, Murina rozendaali
      - Brown tube-nosed bat, Murina suilla
  - Subfamily: Miniopterinae
    - Genus: Miniopterus
      - Western bent-winged bat, Miniopterus magnater
      - Intermediate long-fingered bat, Miniopterus medius
      - Small bent-winged bat, Miniopterus pusillus
      - Common bent-wing bat, M. schreibersii VU
- Family: Molossidae
  - Genus: Chaerephon
    - Northern free-tailed bat, Chaerephon johorensis
    - Wrinkle-lipped free-tailed bat, Chaerephon plicata
  - Genus: Cheiromeles
    - Hairless bat, Cheiromeles torquatus
  - Genus: Mops
    - Malayan free-tailed bat, Mops mops
- Family: Emballonuridae
  - Genus: Emballonura
    - Small Asian sheath-tailed bat, Emballonura alecto
    - Lesser sheath-tailed bat, Emballonura monticola
  - Genus: Saccolaimus
    - Naked-rumped pouched bat, Saccolaimus saccolaimus
  - Genus: Taphozous
    - Long-winged tomb bat, Taphozous longimanus
    - Black-bearded tomb bat, Taphozous melanopogon
- Family: Nycteridae
  - Genus: Nycteris
    - Malayan slit-faced bat, Nycteris tragata
- Family: Megadermatidae
  - Genus: Megaderma
    - Greater false vampire bat, Megaderma lyra
    - Lesser false vampire bat, Megaderma spasma
- Family: Rhinolophidae
  - Subfamily: Rhinolophinae
    - Genus: Rhinolophus
      - Acuminate horseshoe bat, Rhinolophus acuminatus
      - Intermediate horseshoe bat, Rhinolophus affinis
      - Arcuate horseshoe bat, Rhinolophus arcuatus
      - Bornean horseshoe bat, Rhinolophus borneensis
      - Croslet horseshoe bat, Rhinolophus coelophyllus
      - Convex horseshoe bat, Rhinolophus convexus
      - Creagh's horseshoe bat, Rhinolophus creaghi
      - Blyth's horseshoe bat, Rhinolophus lepidus
      - Woolly horseshoe bat, Rhinolophus luctus
      - Big-eared horseshoe bat, Rhinolophus macrotis
      - Malayan horseshoe bat, Rhinolophus malayanus
      - Marshall's horseshoe bat, Rhinolophus marshalli
      - Smaller horseshoe bat, Rhinolophus megaphyllus
      - Pearson's horseshoe bat, Rhinolophus pearsoni
      - Large-eared horseshoe bat, Rhinolophus philippinensis
      - Least horseshoe bat, Rhinolophus pusillus
      - Lesser woolly horseshoe bat, Rhinolophus sedulus
      - Shamel's horseshoe bat, Rhinolophus shameli
      - Lesser brown horseshoe bat, Rhinolophus stheno
      - Trefoil horseshoe bat, Rhinolophus trifoliatus
  - Subfamily: Hipposiderinae
    - Genus: Aselliscus
      - Stoliczka's trident bat, Aselliscus stoliczkanus
    - Genus: Coelops
      - East Asian tailless leaf-nosed bat, Coelops frithii
      - Malayan tailless leaf-nosed bat, Coelops robinsoni
    - Genus: Hipposideros
      - Great roundleaf bat, Hipposideros armiger
      - Dusky roundleaf bat, Hipposideros ater
      - Bicolored roundleaf bat, Hipposideros bicolor
      - Fawn leaf-nosed bat, Hipposideros cervinus
      - Ashy roundleaf bat, Hipposideros cineraceus
      - Cox's roundleaf bat, Hipposideros coxi VU
      - Diadem roundleaf bat, Hipposideros diadema
      - Borneo roundleaf bat, Hipposideros doriae DD
      - Dayak roundleaf bat, Hipposideros dyacorum
      - Cantor's roundleaf bat, Hipposideros galeritus
      - Intermediate roundleaf bat, Hipposideros larvatus
      - Large Asian roundleaf bat, Hipposideros lekaguli
      - Shield-faced roundleaf bat, Hipposideros lylei
      - Malayan roundleaf bat, Hipposideros nequam
      - Pomona roundleaf bat, Hipposideros pomona
      - Pratt's roundleaf bat, Hipposideros pratti
      - Ridley's leaf-nosed bat, Hipposideros ridleyi VU

== Pholidota (pangolins) ==
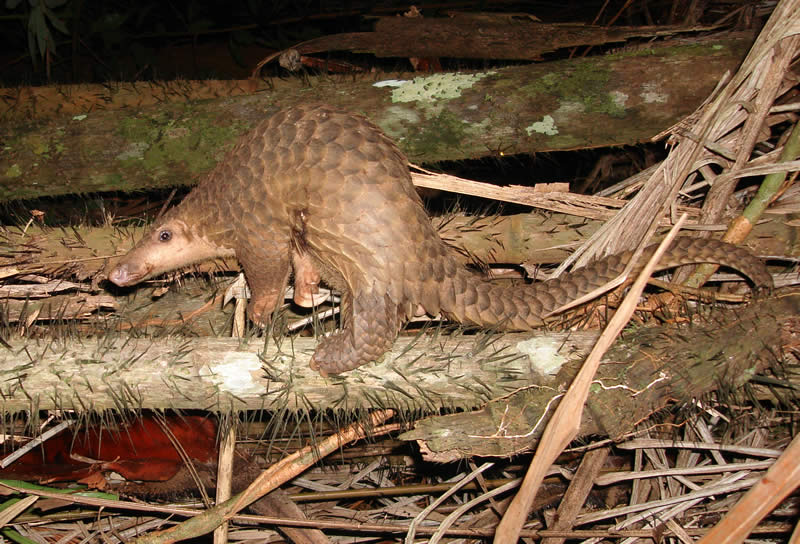
Sunda pangolin

The order Pholidota comprises the eight species of pangolin. Pangolins are anteaters and have the powerful claws, elongated snout and long tongue seen in the other unrelated anteater species.

- Family: Manidae
  - Genus: Manis
    - Sunda pangolin, M. javanica CR

== Cetacea (whales) ==
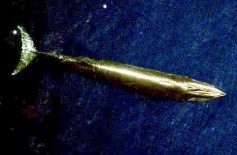
Bryde's whale

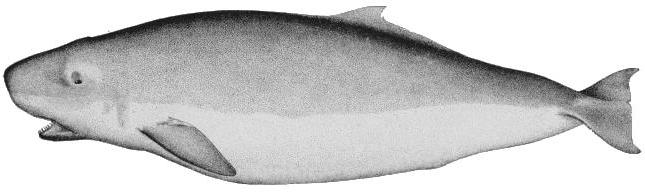
Pygmy sperm whale

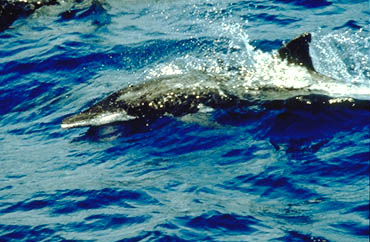
Rough-toothed dolphin

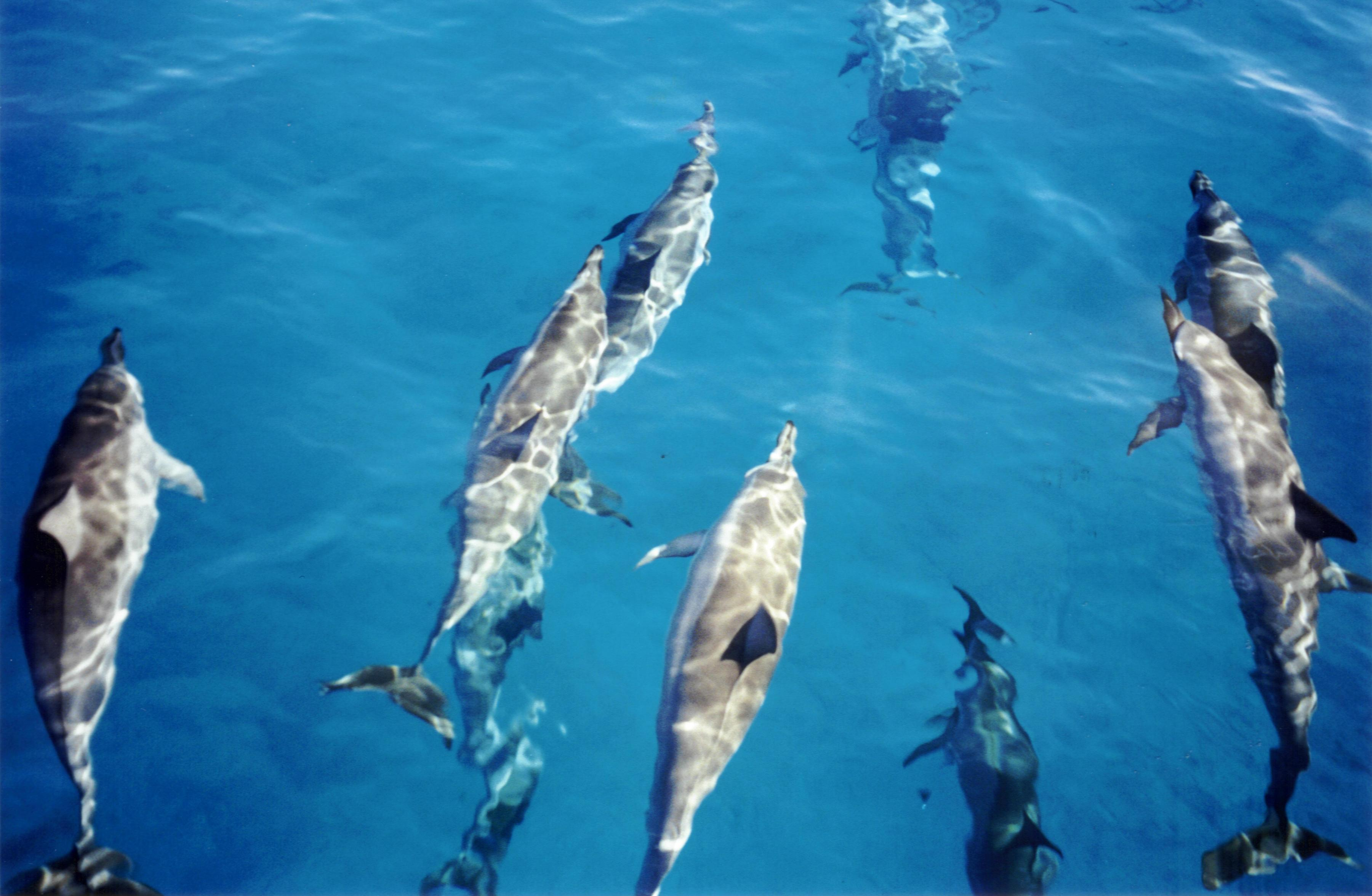
Spinner dolphin

The order Cetacea includes whales, dolphins and porpoises. They are the mammals most fully adapted to aquatic life with a spindle-shaped nearly hairless body, protected by a thick layer of blubber, and forelimbs and tail modified to provide propulsion underwater.

- Parvorder: Mysticeti
  - Family: Balaenopteridae
    - Subfamily: Balaenopterinae
      - Genus: Balaenoptera
        - Common minke whale, B. acutorostrata LC
        - Antarctic minke whale, Balaenoptera bonaerensis DD
        - Sei whale, Balaenoptera borealis EN
        - Bryde's whale, Balaenoptera edeni DD
        - Blue whale, Balaenoptera musculus EN
        - Omura's whale, Balaenoptera omurai DD
        - Fin whale, Balaenoptera physalus EN
    - Subfamily: Megapterinae
      - Genus: Megaptera
        - Humpback whale, M. novaeangliae LC
- Parvorder: Odontoceti
  - Superfamily: Platanistoidea
    - Family: Phocoenidae
      - Genus: Neophocaena
        - Finless porpoise, Neophocaena phocaenoides DD
    - Family: Physeteridae
      - Genus: Physeter
        - Sperm whale, Physeter macrocephalus VU
    - Family: Kogiidae
      - Genus: Kogia
        - Pygmy sperm whale, K. breviceps DD
        - Dwarf sperm whale, Kogia sima
    - Family: Ziphidae
      - Subfamily: Hyperoodontinae
        - Genus: Mesoplodon
          - Blainville's beaked whale, Mesoplodon densirostris DD
          - Ginkgo-toothed beaked whale, Mesoplodon ginkgodens DD
        - Genus: Ziphius
          - Cuvier's beaked whale, Ziphius cavirostris DD
    - Family: Delphinidae (marine dolphins)
      - Genus: Steno
        - Rough-toothed dolphin, Steno bredanensis DD
      - Genus: Sousa
        - Indo-Pacific humpbacked dolphin, Sousa chinensis DD
      - Genus: Tursiops
        - Indo-Pacific bottlenose dolphin, Tursiops aduncus DD
        - Common bottlenose dolphin, Tursiops truncatus DD
      - Genus: Delphinus
        - Long-beaked common dolphin, Delphinus capensis DD
      - Genus: Grampus
        - Risso's dolphin, Grampus griseus DD
      - Genus: Peponocephala
        - Melon-headed whale, Peponocephala electra
      - Genus: Feresa
        - Pygmy killer whale, Feresa attenuata DD
      - Genus: Globicephala
        - Short-finned pilot whale, Globicephala macrorhynchus DD
      - Genus: Lagenodelphis
        - Fraser's dolphin, Lagenodelphis hosei DD
      - Genus: Orcaella
        - Irrawaddy dolphin, O. brevirostris EN
      - Genus: Orcinus
        - Orca, O. orca DD
      - Genus: Pseudorca
        - False killer whale, Pseudorca crassidens DD
      - Genus: Stenella
        - Pantropical spotted dolphin, Stenella attenuata
        - Spinner dolphin, Stenella longirostris
        - Striped dolphin, Stenella coeruleoalba LC

== Carnivora (carnivorans) ==
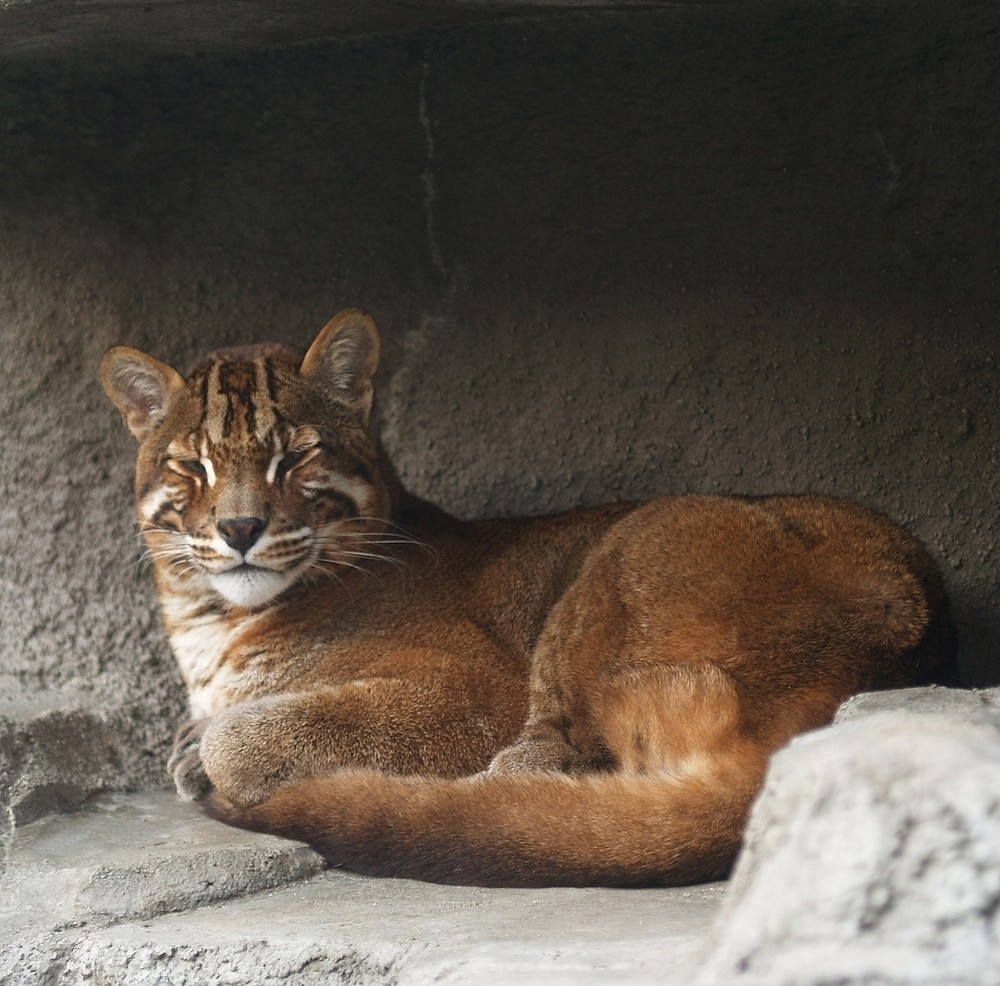
Asian golden cat

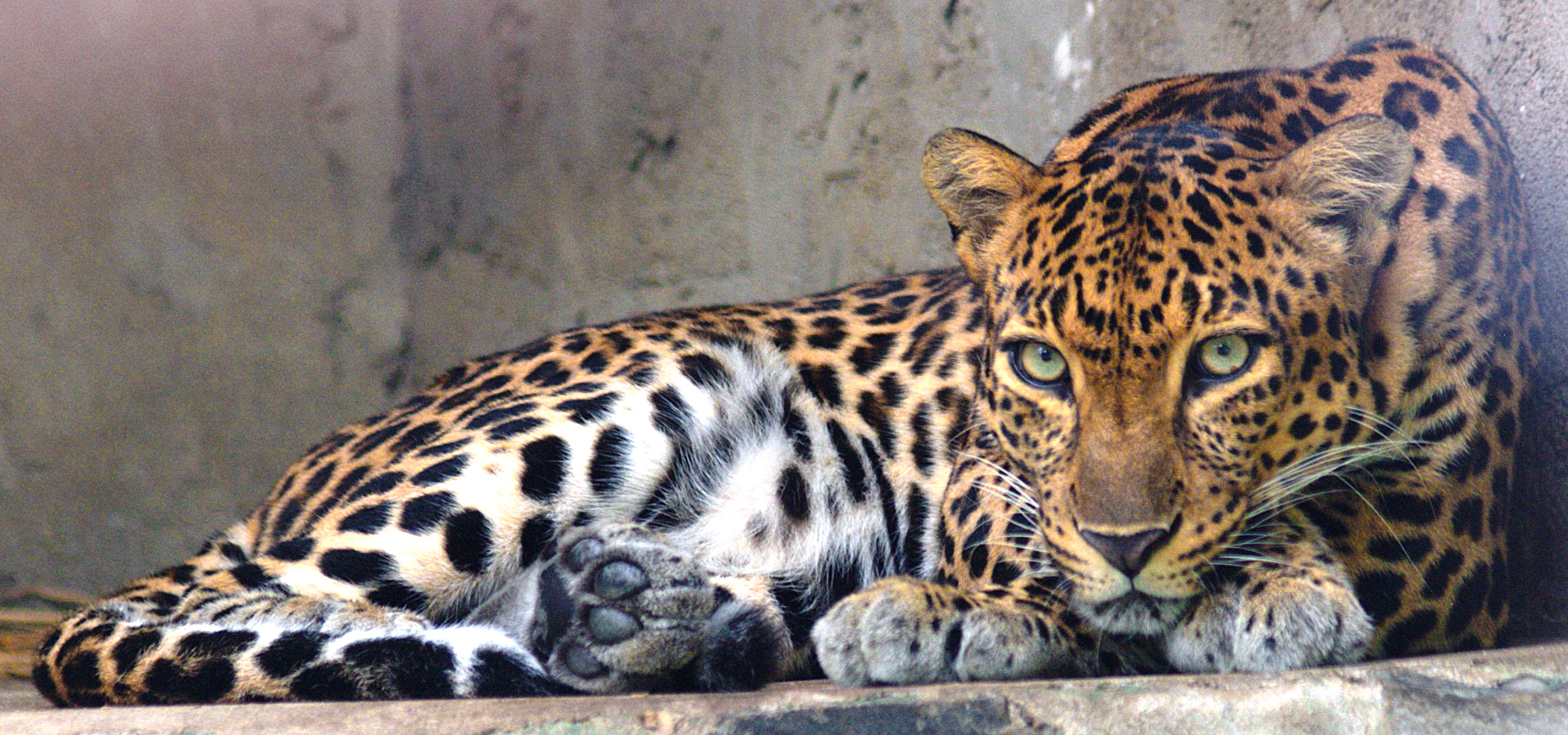
Leopard

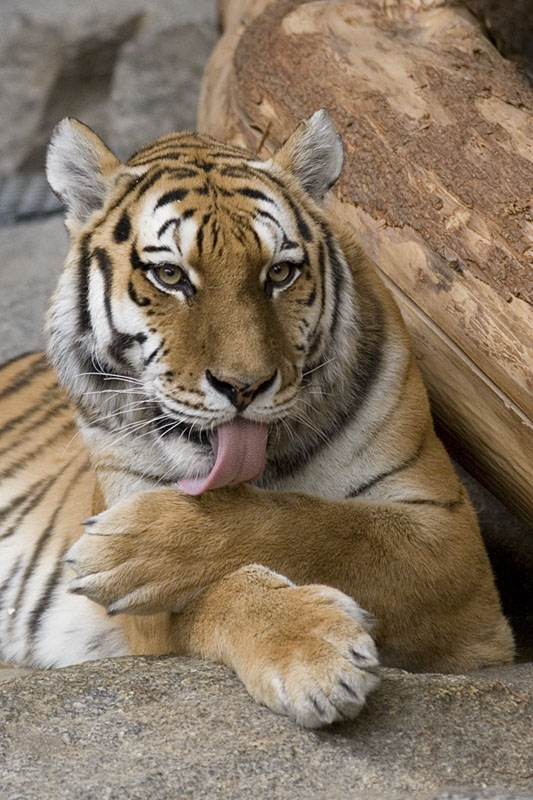
Tiger

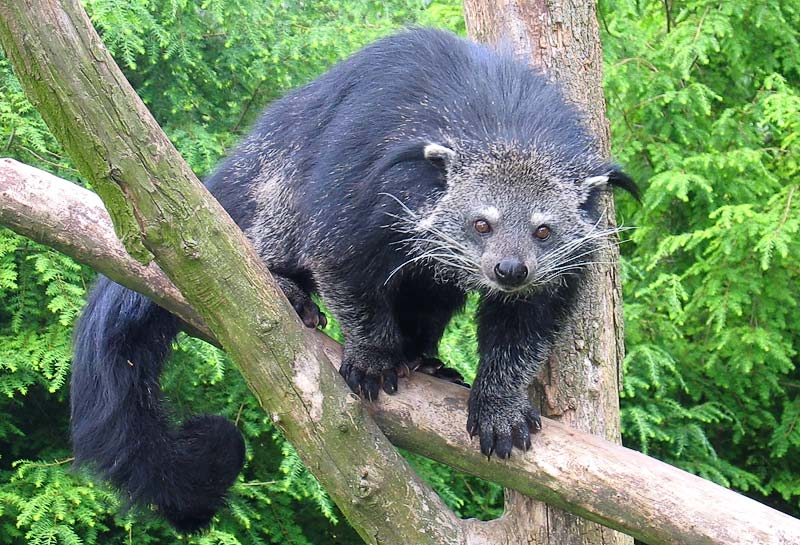
Binturong

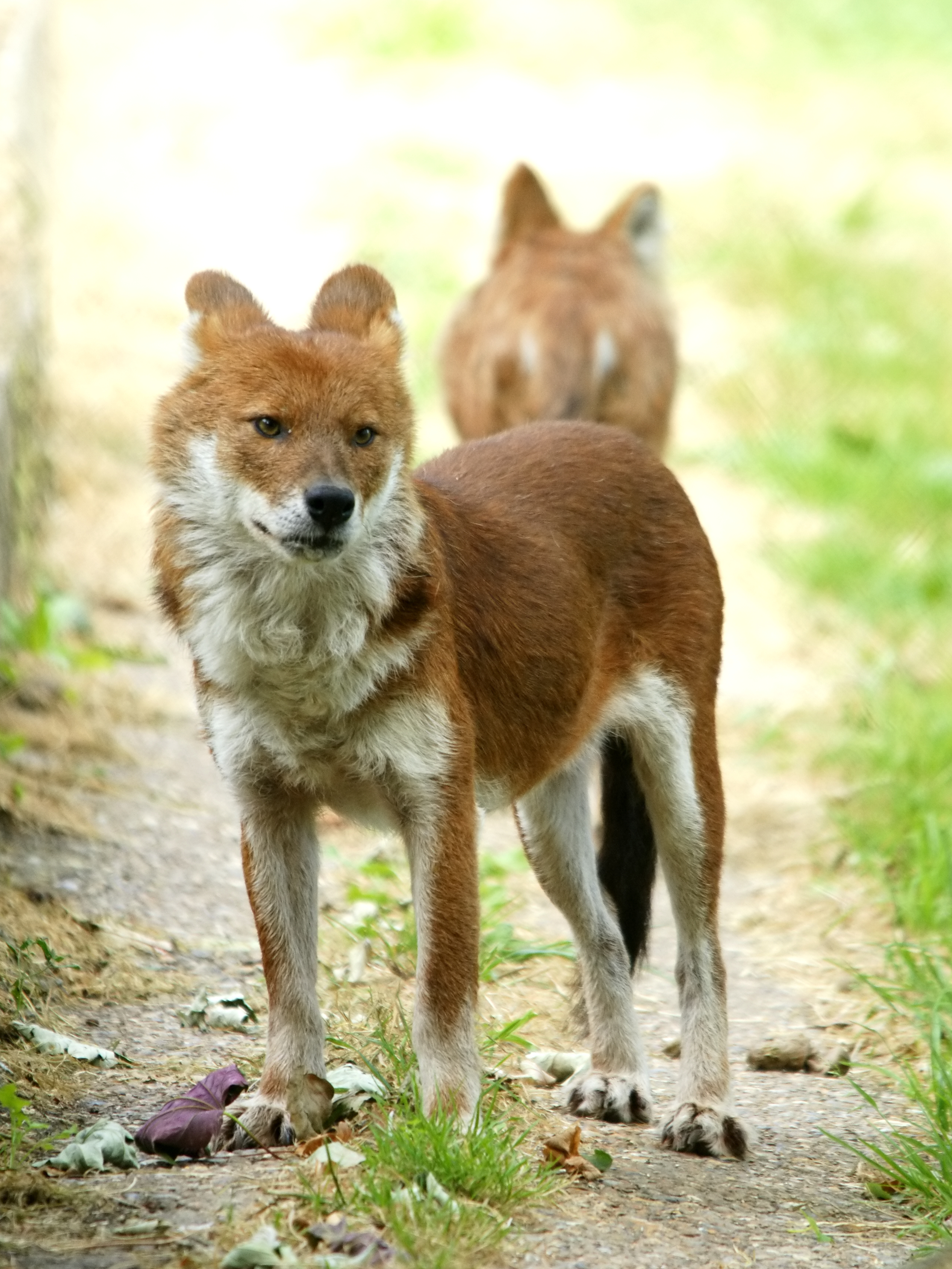
Dhole

There are over 260 species of carnivorans, the majority of which feed primarily on meat. They have a characteristic skull shape and dentition.

- Suborder: Feliformia
  - Family: Felidae (cats)
    - Subfamily: Felinae
      - Genus: Catopuma
        - Bay cat, C. badia EN
        - Asian golden cat, C. temminckii NT
      - Genus: Pardofelis
        - Marbled cat, P. marmorata NT
      - Genus: Prionailurus
        - Leopard cat, P. bengalensis LC
        - Flat-headed cat, P. planiceps VU
    - Subfamily: Pantherinae
      - Genus: Neofelis
        - Sunda clouded leopard, N. diardi VU
        - Clouded leopard, N. nebulosa VU
      - Genus: Panthera
        - Leopard, P. pardus VU
          - Indochinese leopard, P. p. delacouri CR
        - Tiger, P. tigris EN
          - Malayan tiger, P. t. tigris CR
  - Family: Viverridae (civets, mongooses, etc.)
    - Subfamily: Paradoxurinae
      - Genus: Arctictis
        - Binturong, A. binturong VU
      - Genus: Arctogalidia
        - Small-toothed palm civet, A. trivirgata LC
      - Genus: Paguma
        - Masked palm civet, P. larvata LC
      - Genus: Paradoxurus
        - Asian palm civet, P. hermaphroditus LC
    - Subfamily: Hemigalinae
      - Genus: Cynogale
        - Otter civet, C. bennettii EN
      - Genus: Diplogale
        - Hose's palm civet, D. hosei VU
      - Genus: Hemigalus
        - Banded palm civet, H. derbyanus NT
    - Subfamily: Prionodontinae
      - Genus: Prionodon
        - Banded linsang, P. linsang LC
    - Subfamily: Viverrinae
      - Genus: Viverra
        - Large-spotted civet, V. megaspila LC
        - Malayan civet, V. tangalunga LC
        - Large Indian civet, V. zibetha LC
      - Genus: Viverricula
        - Small Indian civet, V. indica LC
  - Family: Herpestidae (mongooses)
    - Genus: Urva
      - Short-tailed mongoose, U. brachyura NT
      - Javan mongoose, U. javanica LC
      - Collared mongoose, U. semitorquata NT
      - Crab-eating mongoose, U. urva LC
- Suborder: Caniformia
  - Family: Canidae (dogs, foxes)
    - Genus: Cuon
      - Dhole, C. alpinus EN
  - Family: Ursidae (bears)
    - Genus: Helarctos
      - Sun bear, H. malayanus VU
  - Family: Mustelidae (mustelids)
    - Genus: Aonyx
      - Asian small-clawed otter, A. cinereus VU
    - Genus: Lutra
      - Hairy-nosed otter, L. sumatrana EN
    - Genus: Lutrogale
      - Smooth-coated otter, L. perspicillata VU
    - Genus: Martes
      - Yellow-throated marten, M. flavigula LC
    - Genus: Melogale
      - Bornean ferret-badger, M. everetti VU
    - Genus: Mustela
      - Malayan weasel, M. nudipes LC
    - Genus: Mydaus
      - Sunda stink badger, M. javanensis LC

== Perissodactyla (odd-toed ungulates) ==
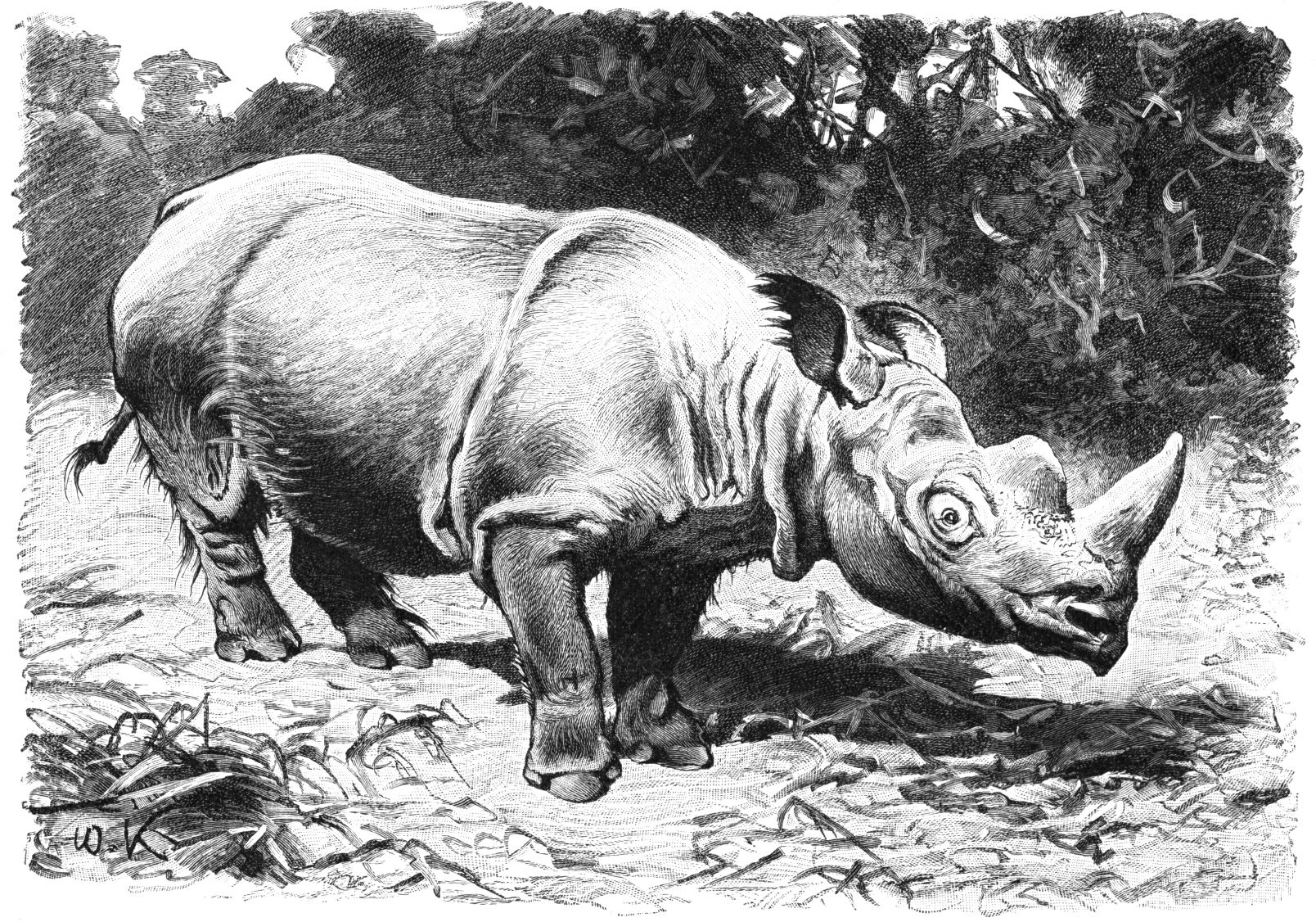
Northern Sumatran rhinoceros

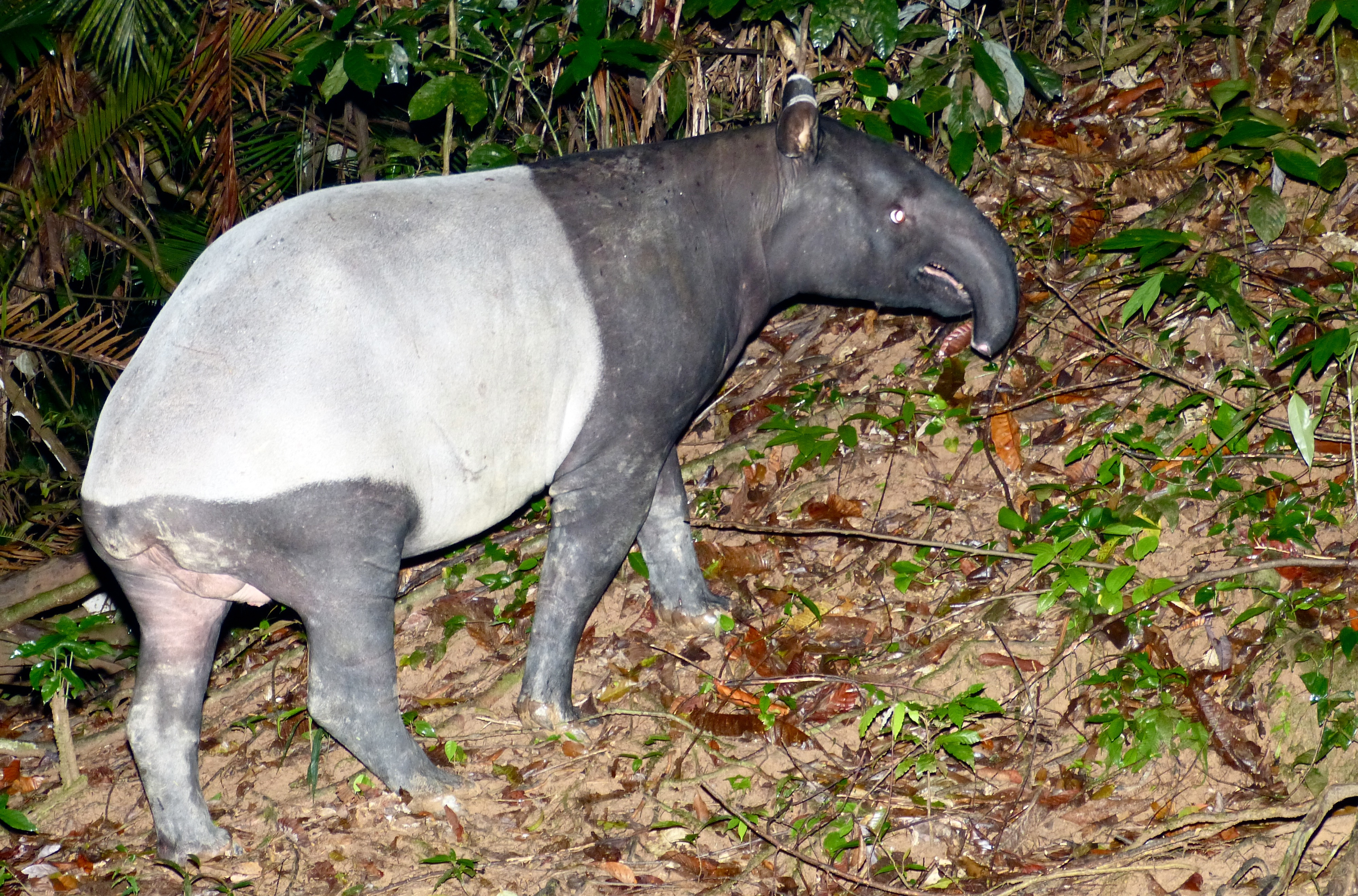
Malayan tapir

The odd-toed ungulates are browsing and grazing mammals. They are usually large to very large, and have relatively simple stomachs and a large middle toe.

- Family: Tapiridae (tapirs)
  - Genus: Acrocodia
    - Malayan tapir, A. indica EN

== Artiodactyla (even-toed ungulates) ==
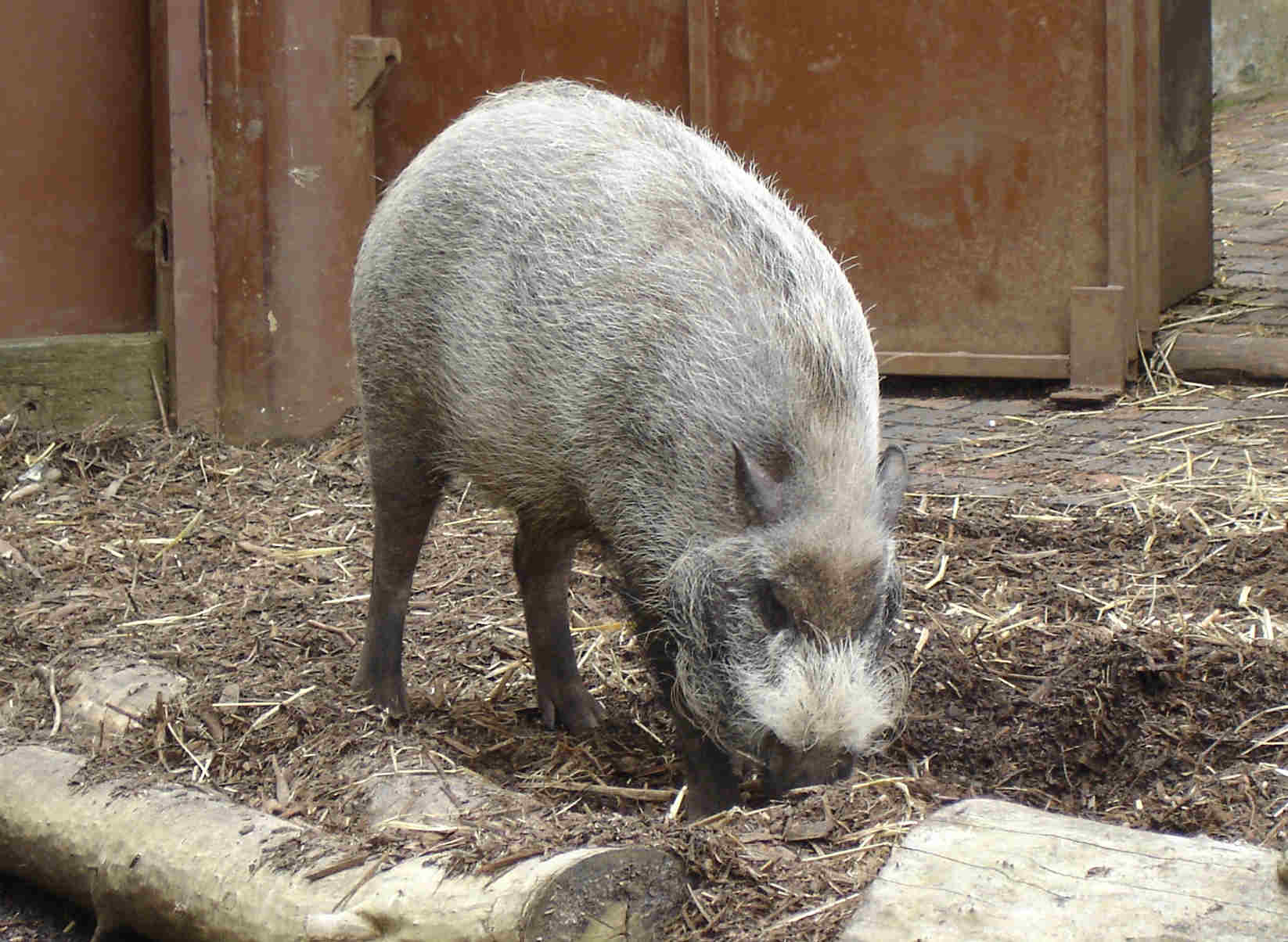
Bornean bearded pig

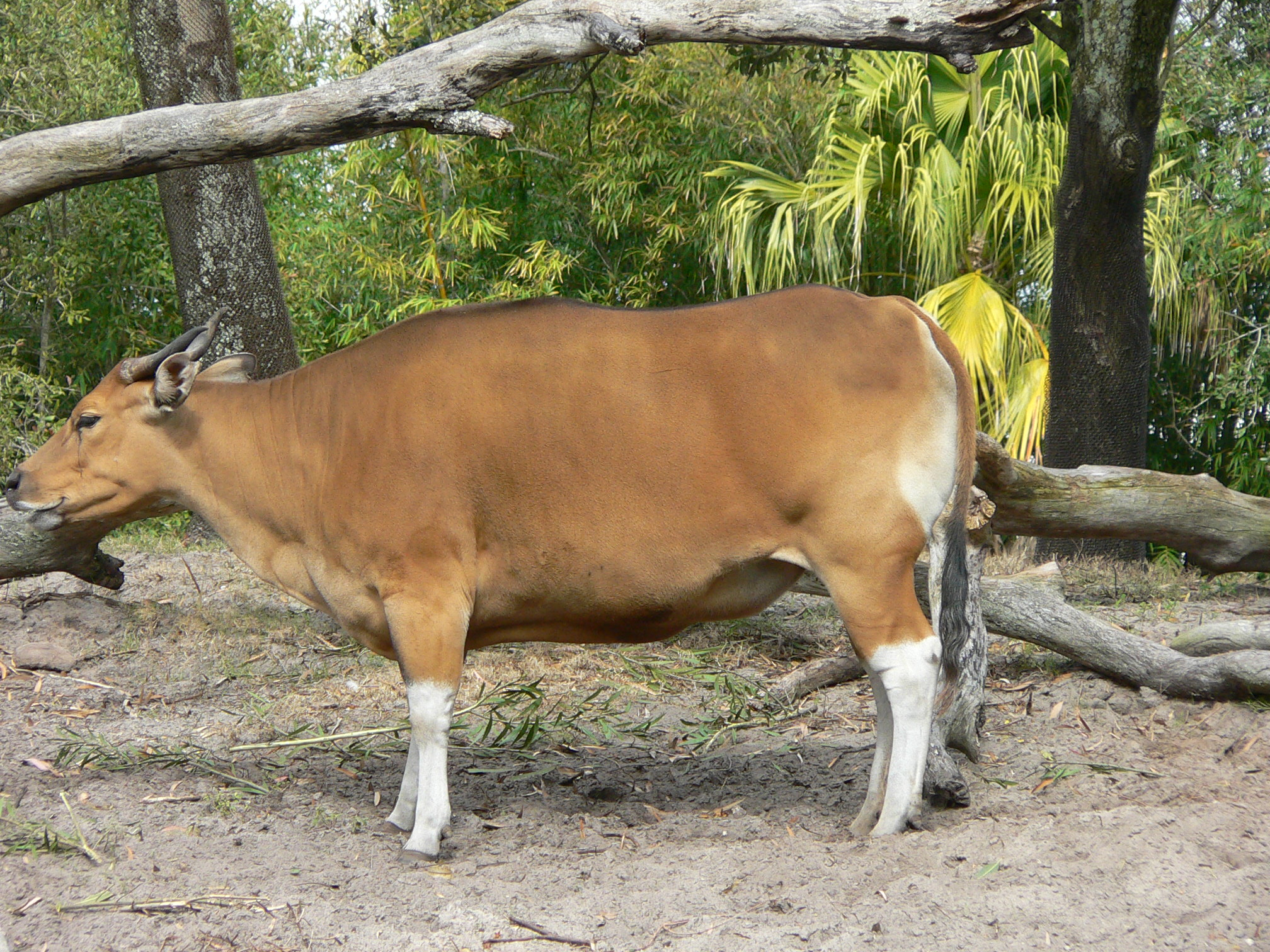
Banteng

The even-toed ungulates are ungulates whose weight is borne about equally by the third and fourth toes, rather than mostly or entirely by the third as in perissodactyls. There are about 220 artiodactyl species, including many that are of great economic importance to humans.

- Family: Tragulidae
  - Genus: Tragulus
    - Lesser mouse deer, T. javanicus LC
    - Napu, T. napu LC
- Family: Cervidae (deer)
  - Subfamily: Cervinae
    - Genus: Rusa
      - Sambar deer, R. unicolor VU
  - Subfamily: Muntiacinae
    - Genus: Muntiacus
      - Bornean yellow muntjac, M. atherodes LC
      - Indian muntjac, M. muntjak LC
- Family: Bovidae (cattle, antelope, sheep, goats)
  - Subfamily: Bovinae
    - Genus: Bos
      - Gaur, B. gaurus VU
      - Banteng, B. javanicus EN
  - Subfamily: Caprinae
    - Genus: Capricornis
      - Mainland serow, C. sumatraensis VU
- Family: Suidae (pigs)
  - Subfamily: Suinae
    - Genus: Sus
      - Bornean bearded pig, S. barbatus VU
      - Wild boar, S. scrofa LC

== Extirpated ==
The following species are locally extinct in the country:

- Wild water buffalo, Bubalus arnee
- Sumatran rhinoceros, Dicerorhinus sumatrensis
- Javan rhinoceros, Rhinoceros sondaicus

== See also ==
- List of chordate orders
- Lists of mammals by region
- Mammal classification
