= Palawan pencil-tailed tree mouse =

Conservation status
- Data Deficient (IUCN 3.1)

Scientific classification
- Kingdom: Animalia
- Phylum: Chordata
- Class: Mammalia
- Order: Rodentia
- Family: Muridae
- Genus: Chiropodomys
- Species: C. calamianensis

Binomial name
- Chiropodomys calamianensis (Taylor, 1934)
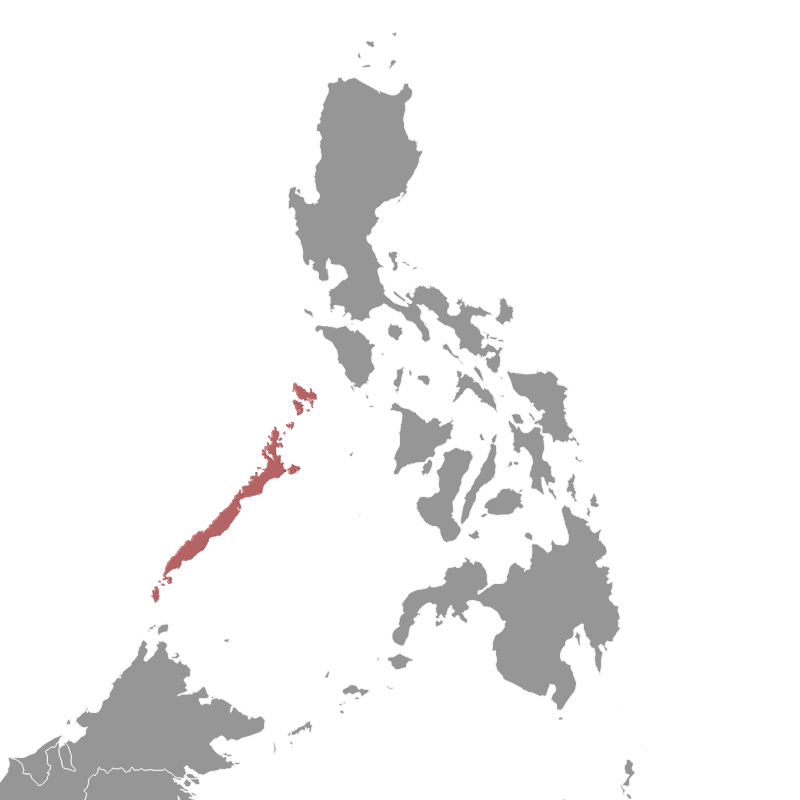

Species of rodent

The Palawan pencil-tailed tree mouse (Chiropodomys calamianensis) is a species of arboreal rodent in the family Muridae. It is known from lowland forest near sea level, coconut groves, and bamboo thickets. It is endemic to the Palawan Faunal Region in the Philippines. It has been recorded on Balabac, Busuanga, Palawan, Dumaran, and Calauit islands.
