= Koopman's pencil-tailed tree mouse =

Conservation status
- Vulnerable (IUCN 3.1)

Scientific classification
- Kingdom: Animalia
- Phylum: Chordata
- Class: Mammalia
- Order: Rodentia
- Family: Muridae
- Genus: Chiropodomys
- Species: C. karlkoopmani

Binomial name
- Chiropodomys karlkoopmani Musser, 1979

Species of rodent

Koopman's pencil-tailed tree mouse (Chiropodomys karlkoopmani) is a species of arboreal rodent in the family Muridae. It is endemic to Pagai and Siberut islands in the Mentawai Islands, off the western coast of Sumatra in Indonesia. Its natural habitat is tropical primary lowland forest. It is threatened by habitat loss (logging).
