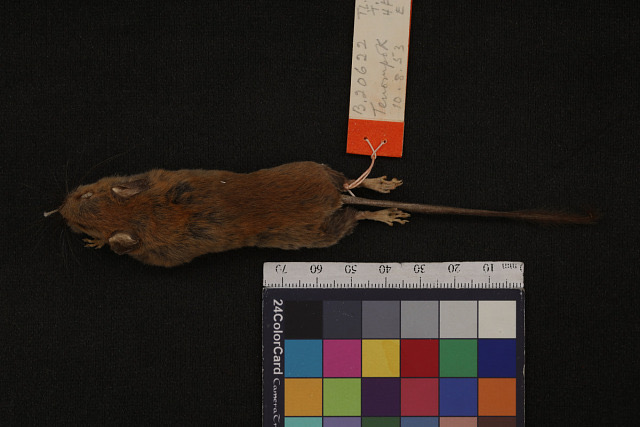
- Chiropodomys muroides specimen with tail measurement

Conservation status
- Data Deficient (IUCN 3.1)

Scientific classification
- Kingdom: Animalia
- Phylum: Chordata
- Class: Mammalia
- Infraclass: Placentalia
- Order: Rodentia
- Family: Muridae
- Genus: Chiropodomys
- Species: C. muroides

Binomial name
- Chiropodomys muroides Medway, 1965

= Gray-bellied pencil-tailed tree mouse =

Species of rodent

The gray-bellied pencil-tailed tree mouse (Chiropodomys muroides) is a species of arboreal rodent in the family Muridae. It is endemic to Borneo where it is known from Gunung Kinabalu (Sabah, Malaysia) and from Long Petak in northern Kalimantan (Indonesia). It probably has wider distribution than currently documented. Its natural habitat is montane tropical forest. It is threatened by habitat loss.
