= Small pencil-tailed tree mouse =

Conservation status
- Data Deficient (IUCN 3.1)

Scientific classification
- Domain: Eukaryota
- Kingdom: Animalia
- Phylum: Chordata
- Class: Mammalia
- Order: Rodentia
- Family: Muridae
- Genus: Chiropodomys
- Species: C. pusillus

Binomial name
- Chiropodomys pusillus Thomas, 1893

Species of rodent

The small pencil-tailed tree mouse or lesser pencil-tailed tree mouse (Chiropodomys pusillus) is a species of arboreal rodent in the family Muridae. It is endemic to Borneo where it is only known from Sabah and Sarawak (Malaysia) and from southern Kalimantan (Indonesia), although it likely occurs more widely.
