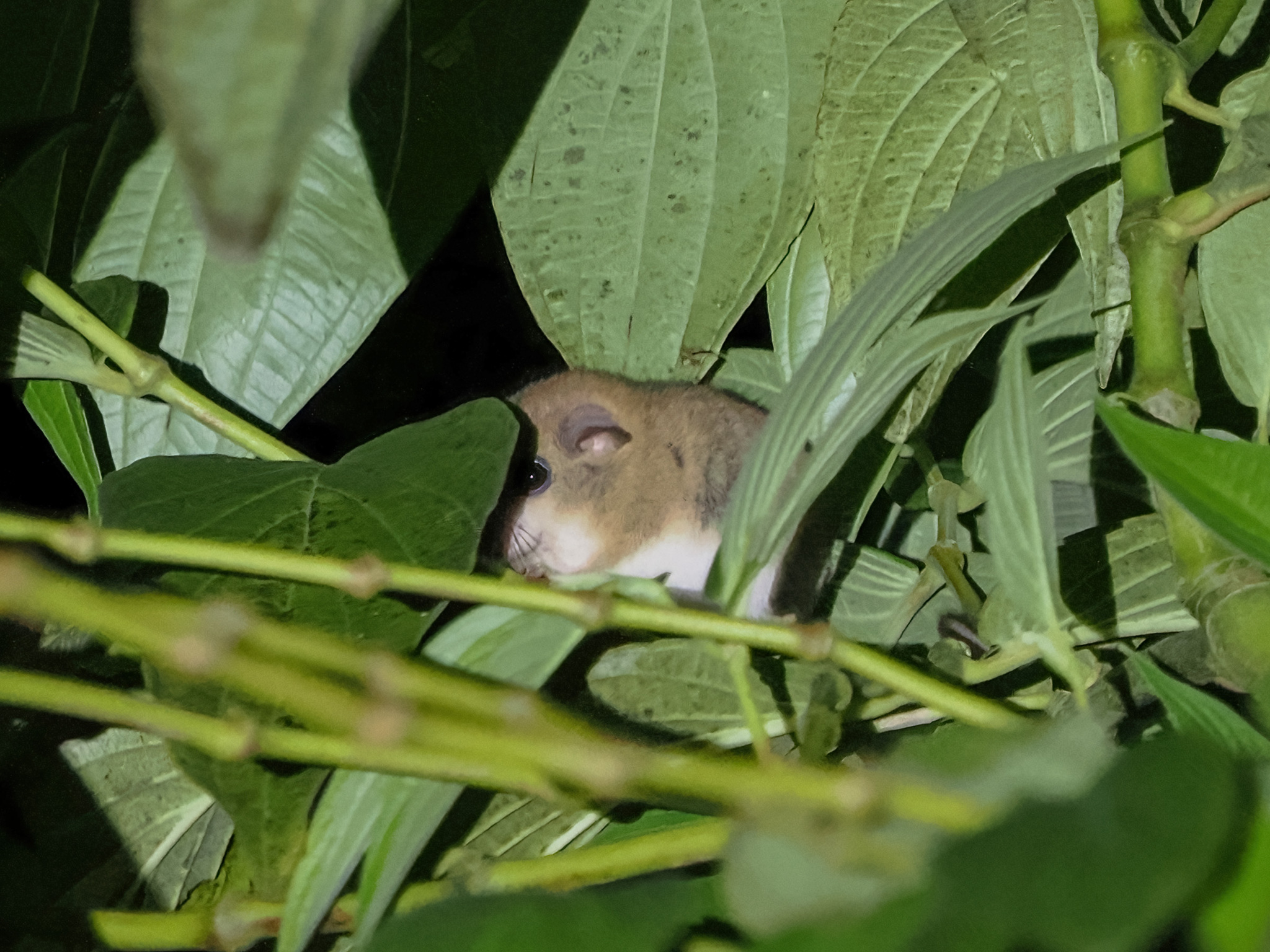

Conservation status
- Least Concern (IUCN 3.1)

Scientific classification
- Kingdom: Animalia
- Phylum: Chordata
- Class: Mammalia
- Order: Rodentia
- Family: Muridae
- Genus: Chiropodomys
- Species: C. gliroides

Binomial name
- Chiropodomys gliroides (Blyth, 1856)
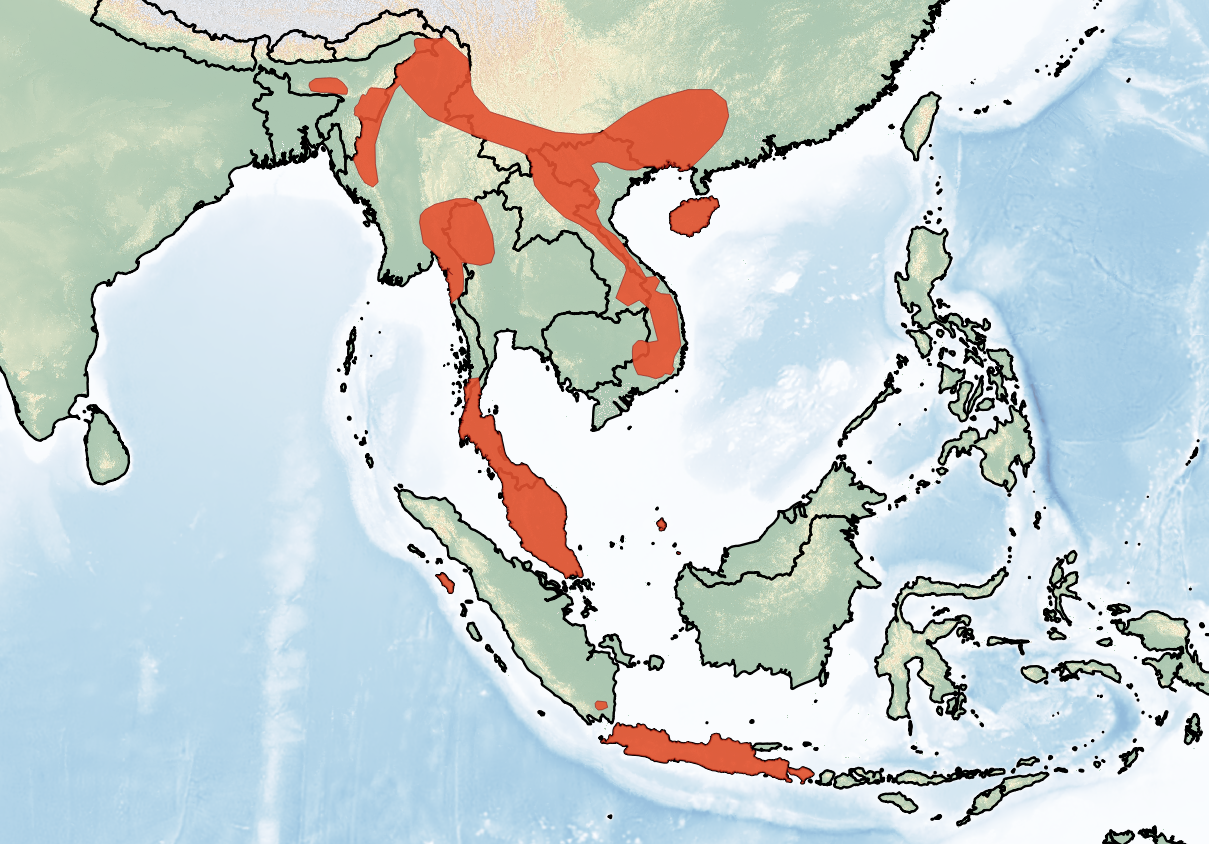

= Indomalayan pencil-tailed tree mouse =

Species of rodent

The Indomalayan pencil-tailed tree mouse or simply pencil-tailed tree mouse (Chiropodomys gliroides) is a species of arboreal rodent in the family Muridae. It is found in northeastern India, southern China (including Hainan), Myanmar, Thailand, Laos, Cambodia, Vietnam, Peninsular Malaysia, and Indonesia (Java, Sumatra, the Mentawai Islands, and some other islands). This locally abundant but patchily distributed species occurs in primary and secondary forests, without affinity to particular forest types. It can suffer from deforestation and is sometimes harvested for consumption.

== Nesting ==
Like all members of the genus Chiropodomys, it builds its nest between stalks of bamboo. It does this by constructing a bundle of leaves and branches between the two stalks, then gnawing through part of the bamboo stalks so that they may enter into the nest. The mice are sociable in nature, and may share their nests with other mice.
