= Large pencil-tailed tree mouse =

Conservation status
- Least Concern (IUCN 3.1)

Scientific classification
- Kingdom: Animalia
- Phylum: Chordata
- Class: Mammalia
- Order: Rodentia
- Family: Muridae
- Genus: Chiropodomys
- Species: C. major

Binomial name
- Chiropodomys major Thomas, 1893

Species of rodent

The large pencil-tailed tree mouse or greater pencil-tailed tree mouse (Chiropodomys major) is a species of arboreal rodent in the family Muridae. It is endemic to Borneo where it is only known from Sabah and Sarawak (Malaysia), although it is likely to also occur in Kalimantan.
