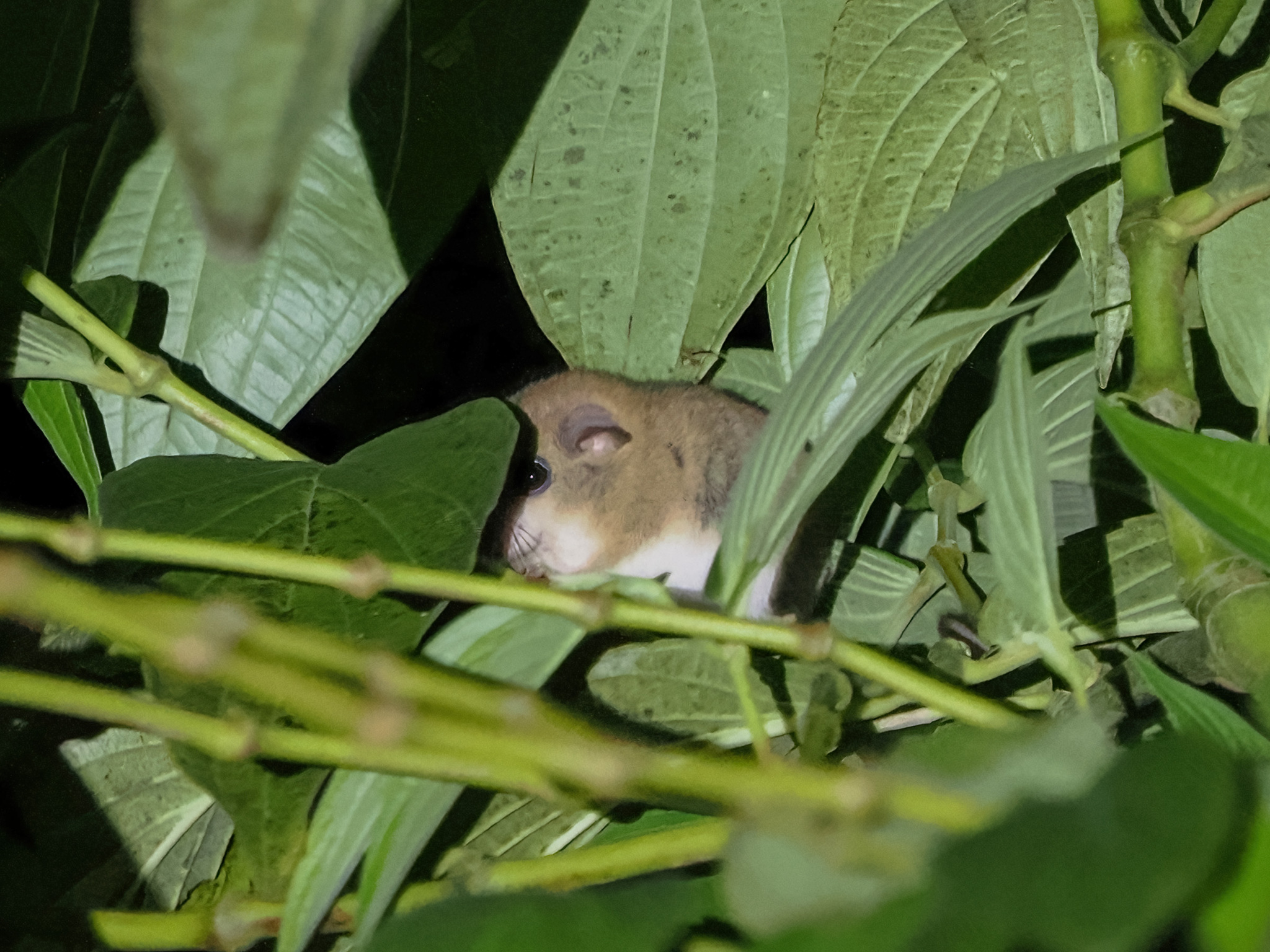
- Indomalayan pencil-tailed tree mouse in Malaysia

Scientific classification
- Domain: Eukaryota
- Kingdom: Animalia
- Phylum: Chordata
- Class: Mammalia
- Order: Rodentia
- Family: Muridae
- Tribe: Hydromyini
- Genus: Chiropodomys; Peters, 1868

Type species
- Mus gliroides

Species
- Chiropodomys calamianensis Chiropodomys gliroides Chiropodomys karlkoopmani Chiropodomys major Chiropodomys muroides Chiropodomys pusillus †Chiropodomys maximus †Chiropodomys primitivus

Synonyms
- Insulaemus Taylor, 1934

= Pencil-tailed tree mouse =

Pencil-tailed tree mice Temporal range: Late Pliocene to Holocene, 2.588–0 Ma

Genus of rodents

Chiropodomys (or pencil-tailed tree mice) is a genus of Old World rats and mice native to Southeast Asia and northeast India. They are tree-dwelling, very small mice, mostly found in tropical rainforest. In total six extant species have been identified, but only one of these, Chiropodomys gliroides, is common and widely distributed, and has been extensively studied.

== Species ==
Genus Chiropodomys — pencil-tailed tree mice:

- Palawan pencil-tailed tree mouse, Chiropodomys calamianensis Taylor, 1934, Palawan and neighboring islands
- Indomalayan pencil-tailed tree mouse, Chiropodomys gliroides Blyth, 1856, northeast India, southeastern China, mainland Southeast Asia, Sumatra, Java
- Koopman's pencil-tailed tree mouse, Chiropodomys karlkoopmani Musser, 1979, Mentawai Islands
- Large pencil-tailed tree mouse, Chiropodomys major Thomas, 1893, Borneo
- Gray-bellied pencil-tailed tree mouse, Chiropodomys muroides Medway, 1965, Borneo
- Small pencil-tailed tree mouse, Chiropodomys pusillus Thomas, 1893, Borneo
- †Chiropodomys maximus, Thailand
- †Chiropodomys primitivus, southern China

== Description ==
Species of Chiropodomys have a body length of 7 to 12 cm, plus a tail of 9 to 17 cm. They are generally gray or brown on the back and white underneath. The tail is only sparsely covered with hair, but has somewhat more at the end, giving the appearance of a pencil, thus the genus name.

Chiropodomys gliroides is particularly common in bamboo forest. It is active at night, sleeps during the day in a nest in the bamboo, padded with leaves. It eats exclusively plants.

Previously, it was thought that Chiropodomys were closely related to the genus Hapalomys (marmoset rats), with both forming a clade with Micromys and Vandeleuria; however, more recent phylogenetic studies support them being closely allied with the Australasian mice and rats of the tribe Hydromyini, either as a distinct tribe of their own or as a group within Hydromyini.
