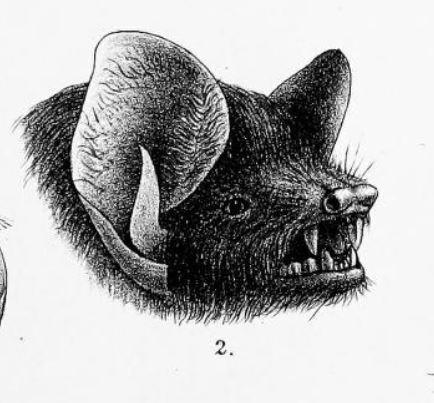

Conservation status
- Least Concern (IUCN 3.1)

Scientific classification
- Kingdom: Animalia
- Phylum: Chordata
- Class: Mammalia
- Order: Chiroptera
- Family: Vespertilionidae
- Subfamily: Murininae
- Genus: Harpiocephalus; Gray, 1842
- Species: H. harpia

Binomial name
- Harpiocephalus harpia Temminck, 1840
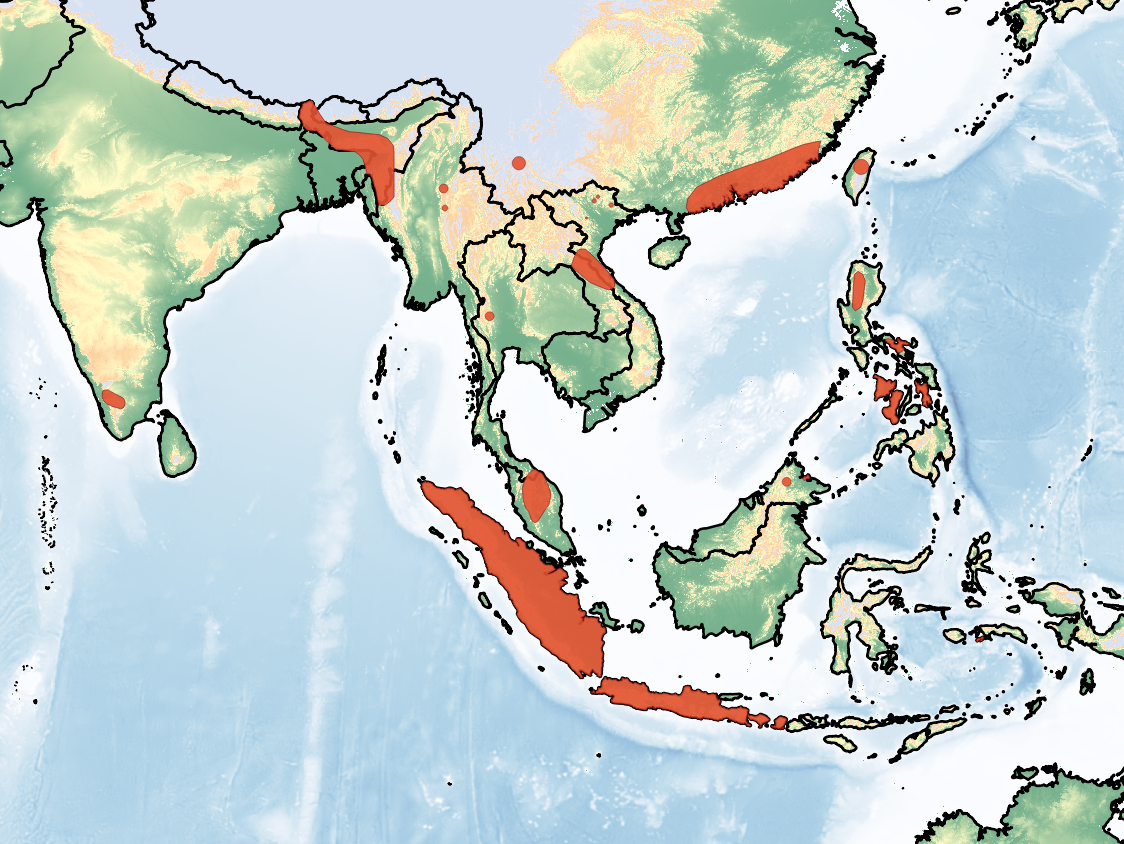

Synonyms
- H. mordax

= Lesser hairy-winged bat =

Species of bat

The lesser hairy-winged bat (Harpiocephalus harpia) is a species of vesper bat in the family Vespertilionidae. It can be found in India, Indonesia, the Philippines, and Taiwan. They are known to eat various species of beetles. It is the only species in the genus Harpiocephalus.
