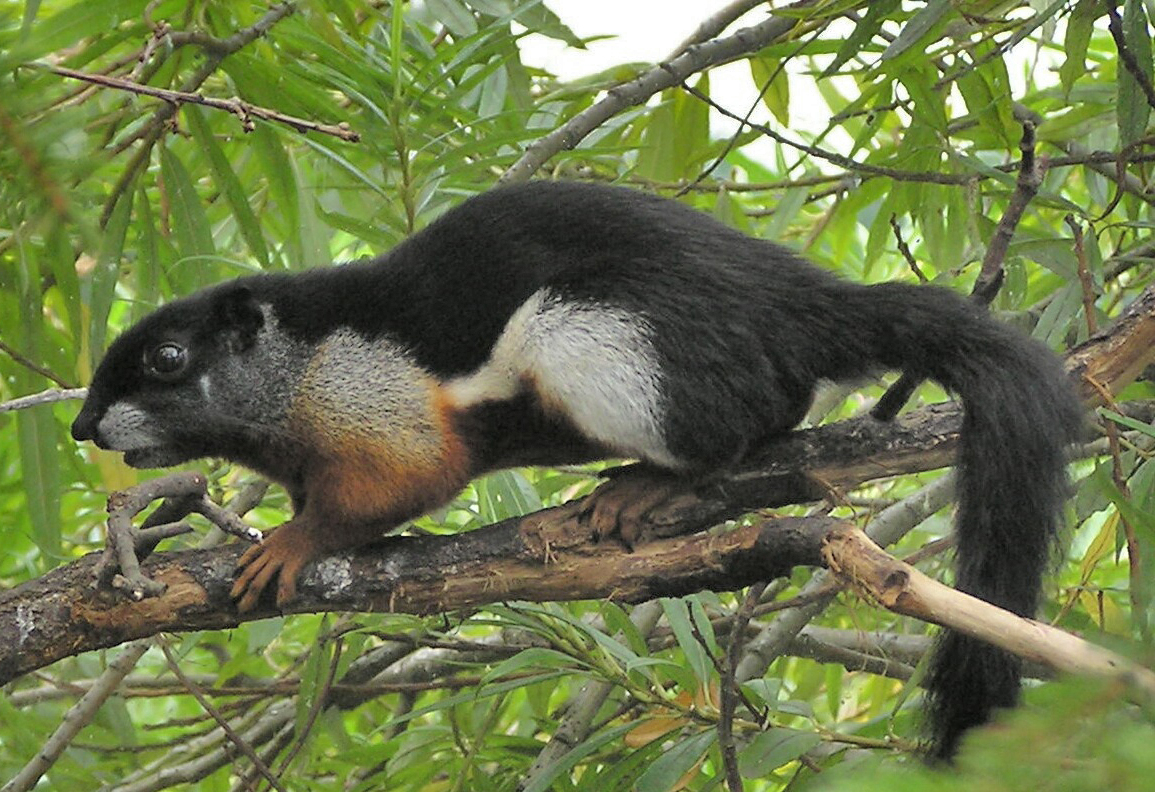
- Prevost's squirrel (Callosciurus prevostii)

Scientific classification
- Kingdom: Animalia
- Phylum: Chordata
- Class: Mammalia
- Order: Rodentia
- Family: Sciuridae
- Tribe: Callosciurini
- Genus: Callosciurus; J.E. Gray, 1867

Type species
- Sciurus rafflesii Vigors & Horsfield, 1867 (= Sciurus prevostii Desmarest, 1822)

Species
- Callosciurus adamsi (Kloss, 1921); Callosciurus albescens (Bonhote, 1901); Callosciurus baluensis (Bonhote, 1901); Callosciurus caniceps (J.E. Gray, 1842); Callosciurus erythraeus (Pallas, 1779); Callosciurus finlaysonii (Horsfield, 1824); Callosciurus honkhoaiensis Nguyen et al., 2018; Callosciurus inornatus (J.E. Gray, 1867); Callosciurus melanogaster (Thomas, 1895); Callosciurus nigrovittatus (Horsfield, 1824); Callosciurus notatus (Boddaert, 1785); Callosciurus orestes (Thomas, 1895); Callosciurus phayrei (Blyth, 1856); Callosciurus prevostii (Desmarest, 1822); Callosciurus pygerythrus (Geoffroy Saint-Hilaire, 1831); Callosciurus quinquestriatus (Anderson, 1871)

= Callosciurus =

Callosciurus Temporal range: Early Pleistocene to Recent

Genus of "beautiful" squirrels from Asia

Callosciurus is a genus of squirrels collectively referred to as the "beautiful squirrels". They are found mainly in Southeast Asia, though a few species also occur in Nepal, northeastern India, Bangladesh and southern China. Several of the species have settled on islands. In total, the genus contains 15 species and numerous varieties and subspecies. The genera Glyphotes, Rubrisciurus, and Tamiops have sometimes been included in Callosciurus.

== Species ==
There are approximately 15 species in this genus, and over 60 subspecies. These squirrels range in length from 13 to 27 cm (5.1 to 10.6 in), not including the tail which is often about the same length as the body. Most are rather dull olive-brown to gray and several have a pale and dark stripe on their side, however a few are very colorful. The Pallas's squirrel may have an olive-gray back, while its belly is often—but not always—bright red. The "typical" subspecies of Prevost's squirrels have black backs, white sides, and red-brown undersides. The Finlayson's squirrel occurs in numerous varieties, three of which are overall red-brown, overall black, or pure white.

Most squirrels in Callosciurus live in tropical rain forests, but some individuals live in parks and gardens in cities. In the trees, they build their nests out of plant material. They are solitary, and give birth to one to five young. Their food consists of nuts, fruits, and seeds, and also of insects and bird eggs.

Image	Scientific name	Common name	Description	Distribution
	Callosciurus quinquestriatus	Anderson's squirrel	Made up of two subspecies, C. q. quinqestriatus and C. q. imarius. This species is listed as "Near Threatened" by the IUCN due to habitat loss.	China and Myanmar
	Callosciurus nigrovittatus	Black-striped squirrel	This taxon consists of four subspecies: C. n. nigrovittatus, C. n. bilimitatus, C. n. bocki, and C. n. klossi. It is listed as "Near Threatened" by the IUCN.	Java, Sumatra, southern Thailand, the Malay Peninsula, and numerous small islands
	Callosciurus orestes	Borneo black-banded squirrel	Listed as "Least Concern" by the IUCN.	Endemic to northern Borneo
	Callosciurus adamsi	Ear-spot squirrel	Listed as "Vulnerable" by the IUCN.	northern Borneo
	Callosciurus finlaysonii, misspelled C. finlaysoni	Finlayson's squirrel, variable squirrel		Cambodia, Laos, Myanmar, Thailand, and Vietnam.
	Callosciurus caniceps	Grey-bellied squirrel	Consist of six subspecies found in forests, plantations and gardens	Peninsular Malaysia, Thailand, southern Myanmar, southern China (Yunnan) and possibly western Laos.
	Callosciurus honkhoaiensis	Hon Khoai squirrel	First described in 2018, it is a dwarf species related to the grey-bellied squirrel, from which it probably diverged during the Pliocene.	found only on Hon Khoai island off the southern tip of Vietnam
	Callosciurus inornatus	Inornate squirrel	This squirrel was once considered a subspecies of Callosciurus pygerythrus, and as a result several texts inaccurately cite C. pygerythrus as being found in these areas. The reclassification was based on different fur characteristics, placing it closer in relation to C. caniceps. It is listed as "Least Concern" by IUCN.	distributed across Laos, Vietnam, and the Chinese province of Yunnan.
	Callosciurus pygerythrus	Irrawaddy squirrel	Made up of seven subspecies	found throughout Bangladesh, China, India, Myanmar, and Nepal.
	Callosciurus baluensis	Kinabalu squirrel	Its tail and upperparts are grizzled blackish, the underparts are reddish-orange, and the flanks have a narrow buff stripe with a broader black stripe below. This species is listed as "Least Concern" by the IUCN.	endemic to northeastern Borneo, specifically the wide area around Mount Kinabalu.
	Callosciurus albescens	Kloss's squirrel	population data is insufficient to assess its endangerment status according to the IUCN. It is debated whether it is a subspecies of C. notatus, which would make Kloss's squirrel instead be named C. notatus albescens.	endemic to northern Sumatra
	Callosciurus melanogaster	Mentawai squirrel	It is further dived into three subspecies: C. m. melanogaster, C. m. mentawi, and C. m. atratus. This small isolated population is listed as "Vulnerable" by the IUCN due to habitat loss.	native to the Mentawai Islands off the west coast of Sumatra
	Callosciurus phayrei	Phayre's squirrel	listed as "Least Concern" by the IUCN.	found in China and southern Myanmar
	Callosciurus notatus	Plantain squirrel	found in a wide range of habitats: forests, mangroves, parks, gardens, agricultural areas	Indonesia, Malaysia, Singapore and Thailand
	Callosciurus prevostii	Prevost's squirrel, Asian tri-colored squirrel		forest in the Thai-Malay Peninsula, Sumatra, Borneo and nearby smaller islands, with an introduced population in northern Sulawesi.
	Callosciurus erythraeus	Pallas's squirrel, red-bellied tree squirrel		Greater China, India, and Southeast Asia.

== Sources ==
- Ronald M. Nowak: Walker's Mammals of the World. Johns Hopkins University Press, 1999 ISBN 0-8018-5789-9
- Ecology Asia page with photos and description.
- Wildlife Singapore Photos and description
- Ecology Asia Photos and description
