= Hon Khoai squirrel =

Conservation status
- Critically Endangered (IUCN 3.1)

Scientific classification
- Kingdom: Animalia
- Phylum: Chordata
- Class: Mammalia
- Order: Rodentia
- Family: Sciuridae
- Genus: Callosciurus
- Species: C. honkhoaiensis

Binomial name
- Callosciurus honkhoaiensis Nguyen et al., 2018

Species of beautiful squirrels from Vietnam

The Hon Khoai squirrel (Callosciurus honkhoaiensis) is a species of squirrel in the family Sciuridae endemic to the small island group of Hon Khoai, which is located off the Indochinese Peninsula off the coast of south Vietnam. It can be physically differentiated from other species of Callosciurus by the hairs at the tip of the tail being white with a black base, as well as the cream-colored ventral side and feet.

This species was likely separated from the mainland by the repeated glaciations and interglaciations during the Pleistocene. Its closest relative is the gray-bellied squirrel (Callosciurus caniceps), which it diverged from as early as the Pliocene. In an example of insular dwarfism, it is much smaller than its mainland relative.
