= Striped squirrel =

Striped squirrel may refer to the following:

- African striped squirrel (genus Funisciurus)
- Asiatic striped squirrel (genus Tamiops)
- Black-striped squirrel (Callosciurus nigrovittatus)

== See also ==
- List of rodents
