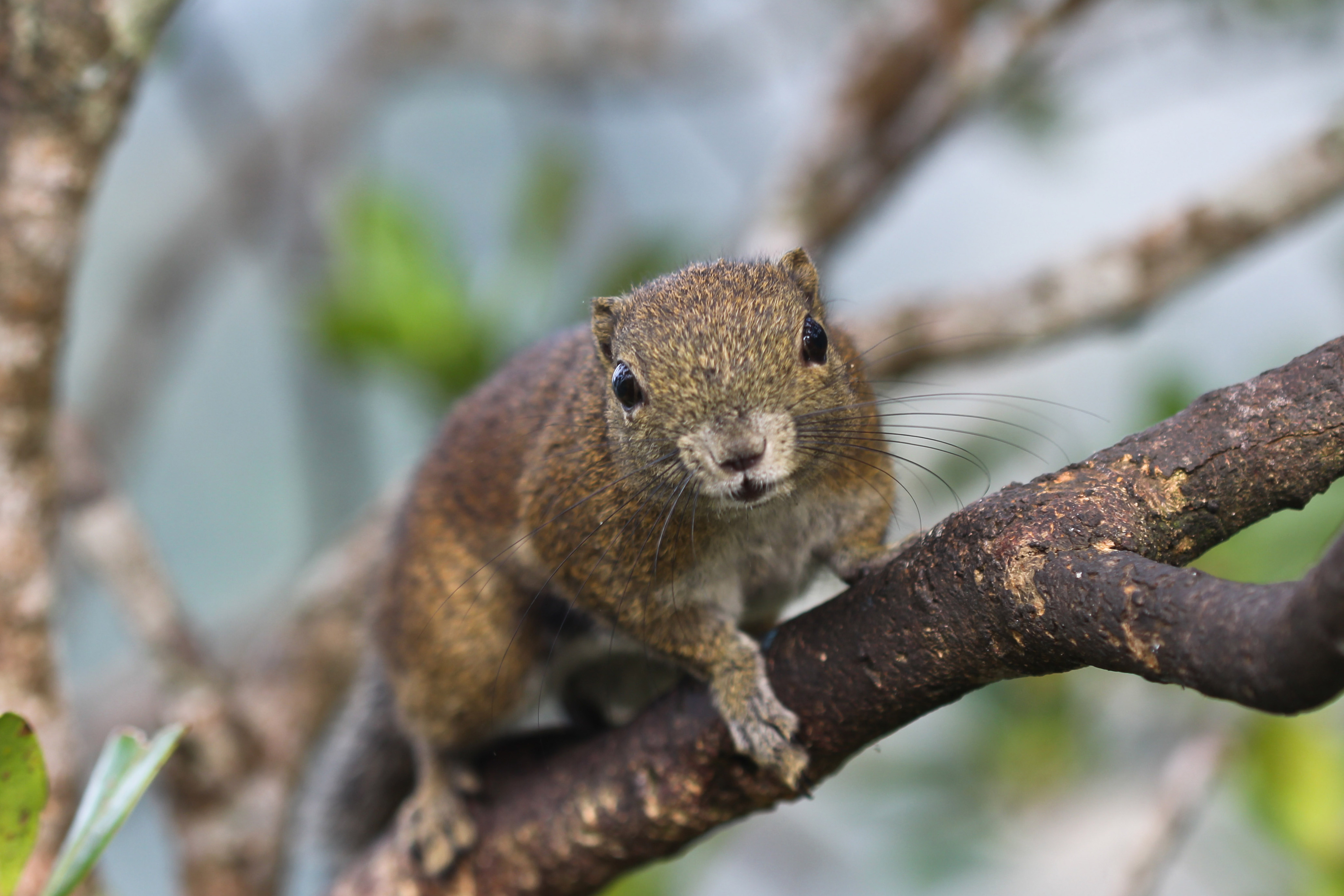
- from Kinabalu National Park

Conservation status
- Near Threatened (IUCN 3.1)

Scientific classification
- Kingdom: Animalia
- Phylum: Chordata
- Class: Mammalia
- Order: Rodentia
- Family: Sciuridae
- Genus: Callosciurus
- Species: C. adamsi

Binomial name
- Callosciurus adamsi (Kloss, 1921)

= Ear-spot squirrel =

Species of squirrel from Borneo

The ear-spot squirrel (Callosciurus adamsi) is a species of rodent in the family Sciuridae. It is endemic to Borneo (Indonesia and Malaysia) and is diurnal and active mainly in small trees. It closely resembles the plantain squirrel (Callosciurus notatus), but is smaller and with a distinct pale buffy patch behind each ear.
