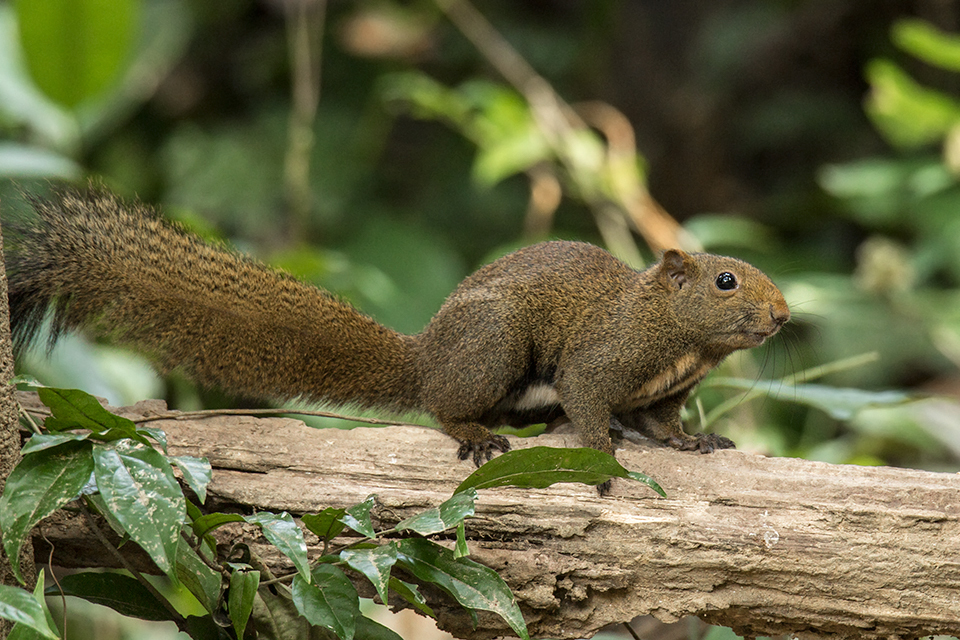

Conservation status
- Least Concern (IUCN 3.1)

Scientific classification
- Kingdom: Animalia
- Phylum: Chordata
- Class: Mammalia
- Order: Rodentia
- Family: Sciuridae
- Genus: Callosciurus
- Species: C. quinquestriatus

Binomial name
- Callosciurus quinquestriatus (Anderson, 1871)

Subspecies
- C. q. quinqestriatus; C. q. imarius
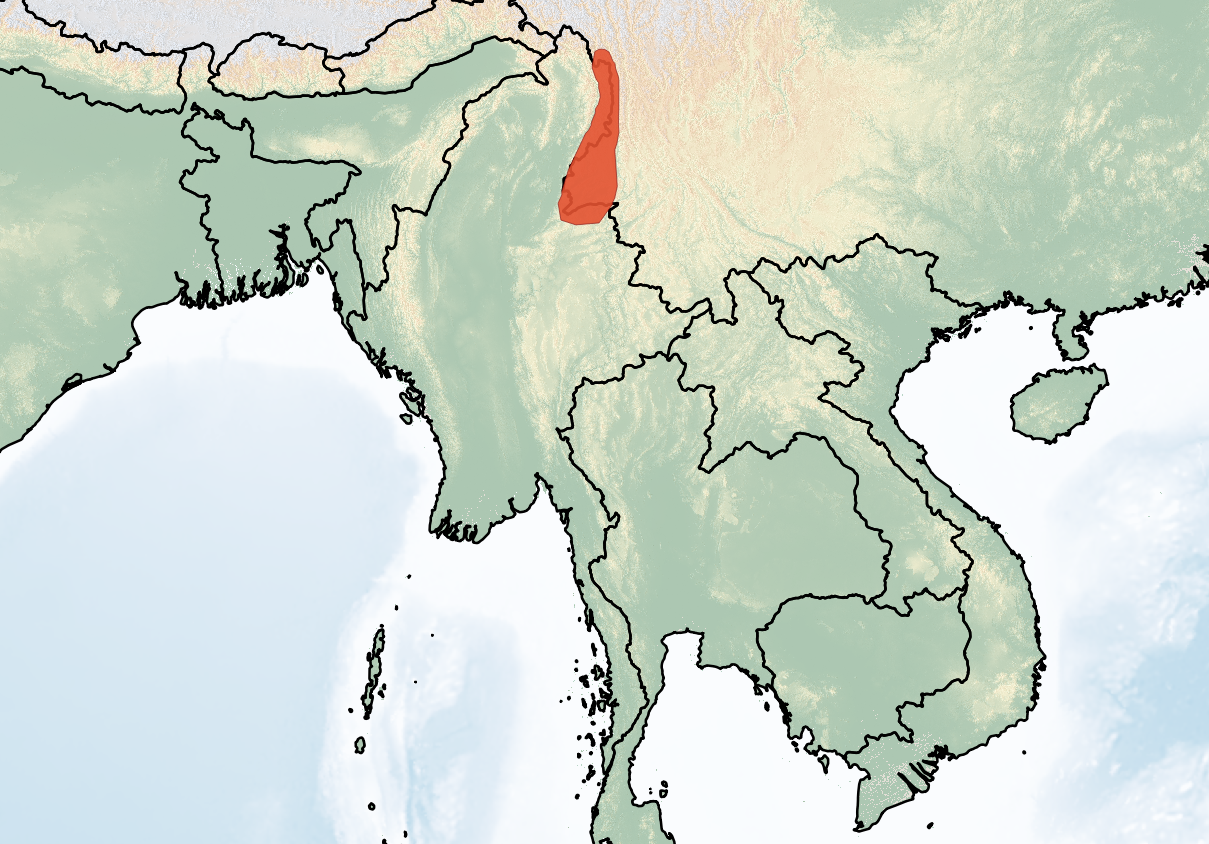

= Anderson's squirrel =

Species of "beautiful" squirrel from Asia

Anderson's squirrel (Callosciurus quinquestriatus) is a species of rodent in the family Sciuridae. It is found in forests in China (Yunnan only) and Myanmar.
