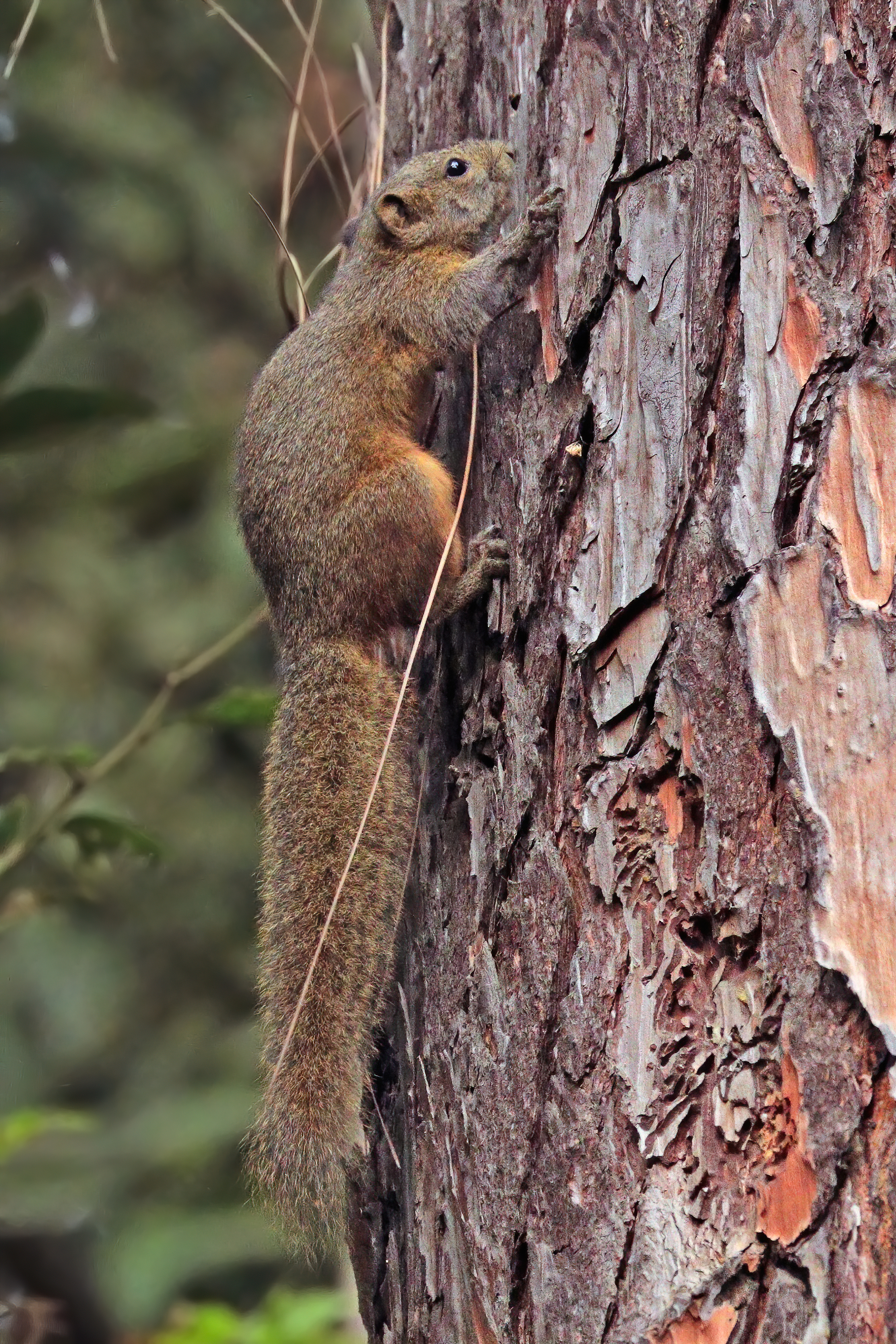
- Nagarjun Forest, Kathmandu, Nepal

Conservation status
- Least Concern (IUCN 3.1)

Scientific classification
- Kingdom: Animalia
- Phylum: Chordata
- Class: Mammalia
- Order: Rodentia
- Family: Sciuridae
- Genus: Callosciurus
- Species: C. pygerythrus

Binomial name
- Callosciurus pygerythrus (I. Geoffroy, 1832)

Subspecies
- C. p. pygerythrus; C. p. blythii; C. p. janetta; C. p. lokroides; C. p. mearsi; C. p. owensi; C. p. stevensi
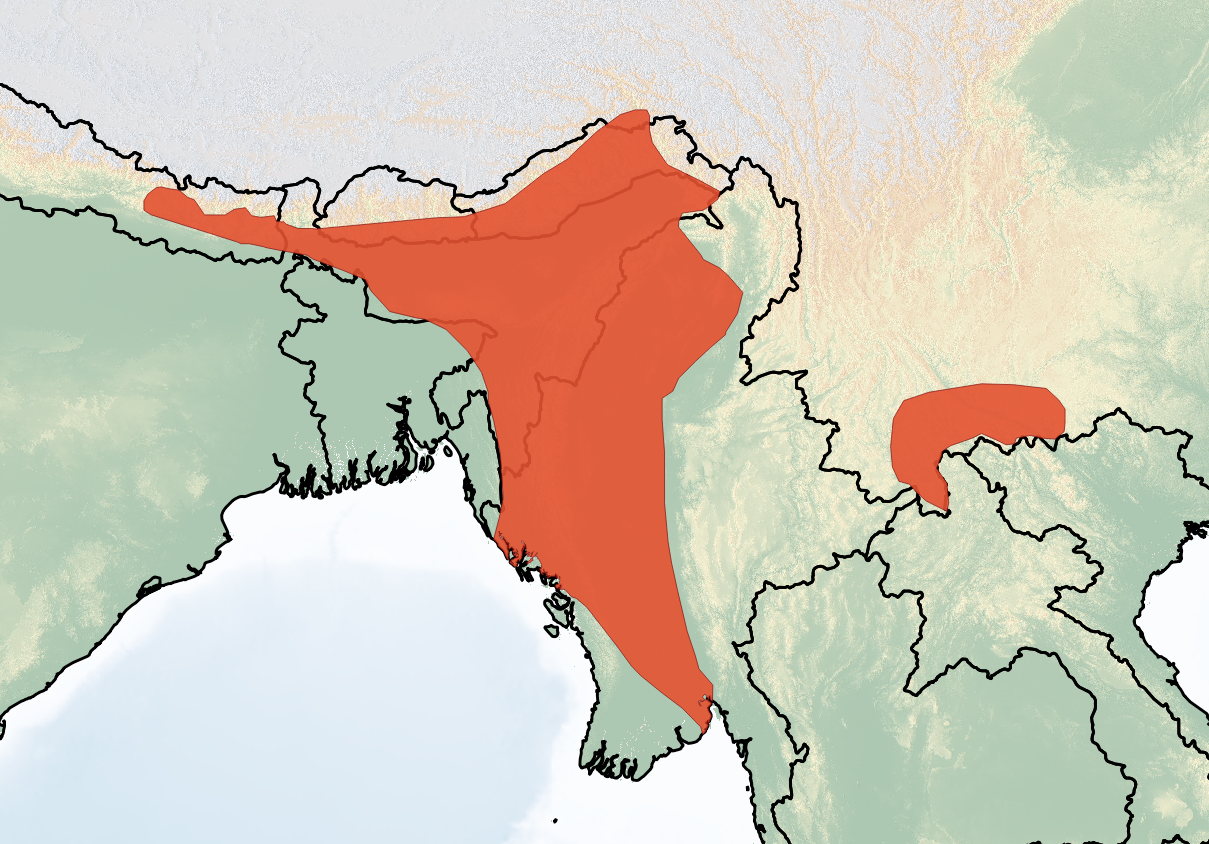

= Irrawaddy squirrel =

Species of squirrel from Asia

The Irrawaddy squirrel (Callosciurus pygerythrus) or hoary-bellied Himalayan squirrel is a species of rodent in the family Sciuridae.

== Description ==
Irrawaddy squirrels vary in fur color, with some squirrels being greyish-brown and reddish-brown, and some squirrels being grizzled. Some squirrels have dark tips on their tails and pale hip patches. Its head to body length is about 20 centimeters and its tail length is about 20 centimeters as well. Irrawaddy squirrels weigh approximately 45 grams.

== Distribution ==
It is native to Bangladesh, China, India, Myanmar, and Nepal. Most squirrels that live in Myanmar live west of the Irrawaddy River. Irrawaddy squirrels can live in several types of forests, including deciduous broad-leaved woodland, coniferous evergreen forests, mixed agricultural areas, and secondary growth forests. They can also live in lowlands and lower mountainous regions, at around 1500 meters. It is threatened by habitat loss.

== Diet ==
Irrawaddy squirrels mainly eat nuts, seeds, fruits, bark, lichen, and various types of vegetation, however, they may occasionally eat insects and small vertebrates.
