= Kloss's squirrel =

Conservation status
- Data Deficient (IUCN 3.1)

Scientific classification
- Kingdom: Animalia
- Phylum: Chordata
- Class: Mammalia
- Order: Rodentia
- Family: Sciuridae
- Genus: Callosciurus
- Species: C. albescens

Binomial name
- Callosciurus albescens (Bonhote, 1901)

Synonyms
- Callosciurus notatus albescens

Species of squirrel from Sumatra

Kloss's squirrel or Kloss squirrel (Callosciurus albescens) is a species of rodent in the family Sciuridae. It is endemic to northern Sumatra in Indonesia. Population data is insufficient to assess its conservation status according to the IUCN. It is sometimes considered a subspecies of C. notatus.
