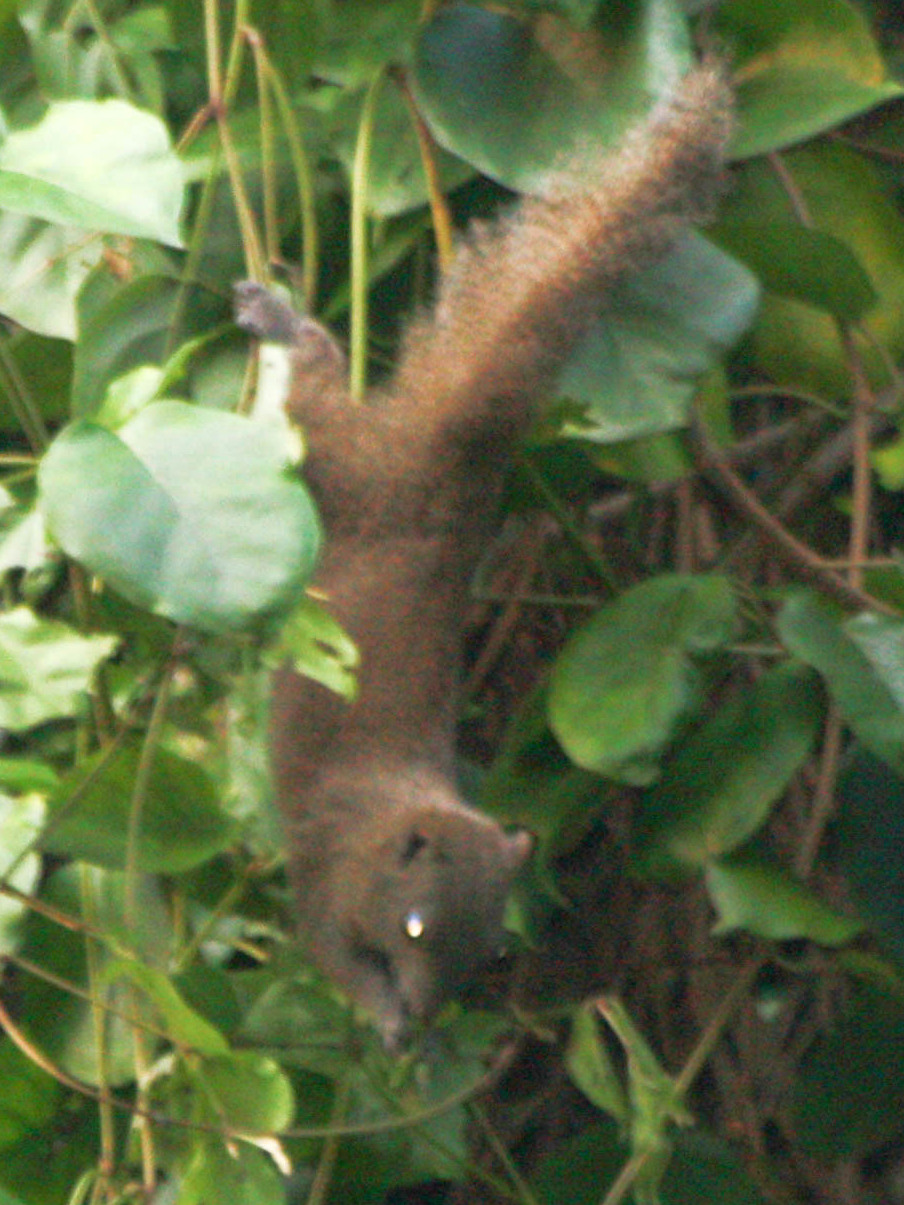

Conservation status
- Least Concern (IUCN 3.1)

Scientific classification
- Kingdom: Animalia
- Phylum: Chordata
- Class: Mammalia
- Order: Rodentia
- Family: Sciuridae
- Genus: Callosciurus
- Species: C. inornatus

Binomial name
- Callosciurus inornatus (J. E. Gray, 1867)

= Inornate squirrel =

Species of "beautiful" squirrel from Asia

The inornate squirrel (Callosciurus inornatus) is a species of rodent in the family Sciuridae. It is found in China, Laos, and Vietnam.
