= Kinabalu squirrel =

Conservation status
- Least Concern (IUCN 3.1)

Scientific classification
- Kingdom: Animalia
- Phylum: Chordata
- Class: Mammalia
- Order: Rodentia
- Family: Sciuridae
- Genus: Callosciurus
- Species: C. baluensis

Binomial name
- Callosciurus baluensis (Bonhote, 1901)

Species of "beautiful" squirrel from Borneo

The Kinabalu squirrel (Callosciurus baluensis) is a species of rodent in the family Sciuridae. It is endemic to highland forest in East Malaysia. Its name is a reference to Mount Kinabalu, though it is not restricted to this mountain. Its tail and upperparts are grizzled blackish, the underparts are reddish-orange, and the flanks have a narrow buff stripe with a broader black stripe below.
