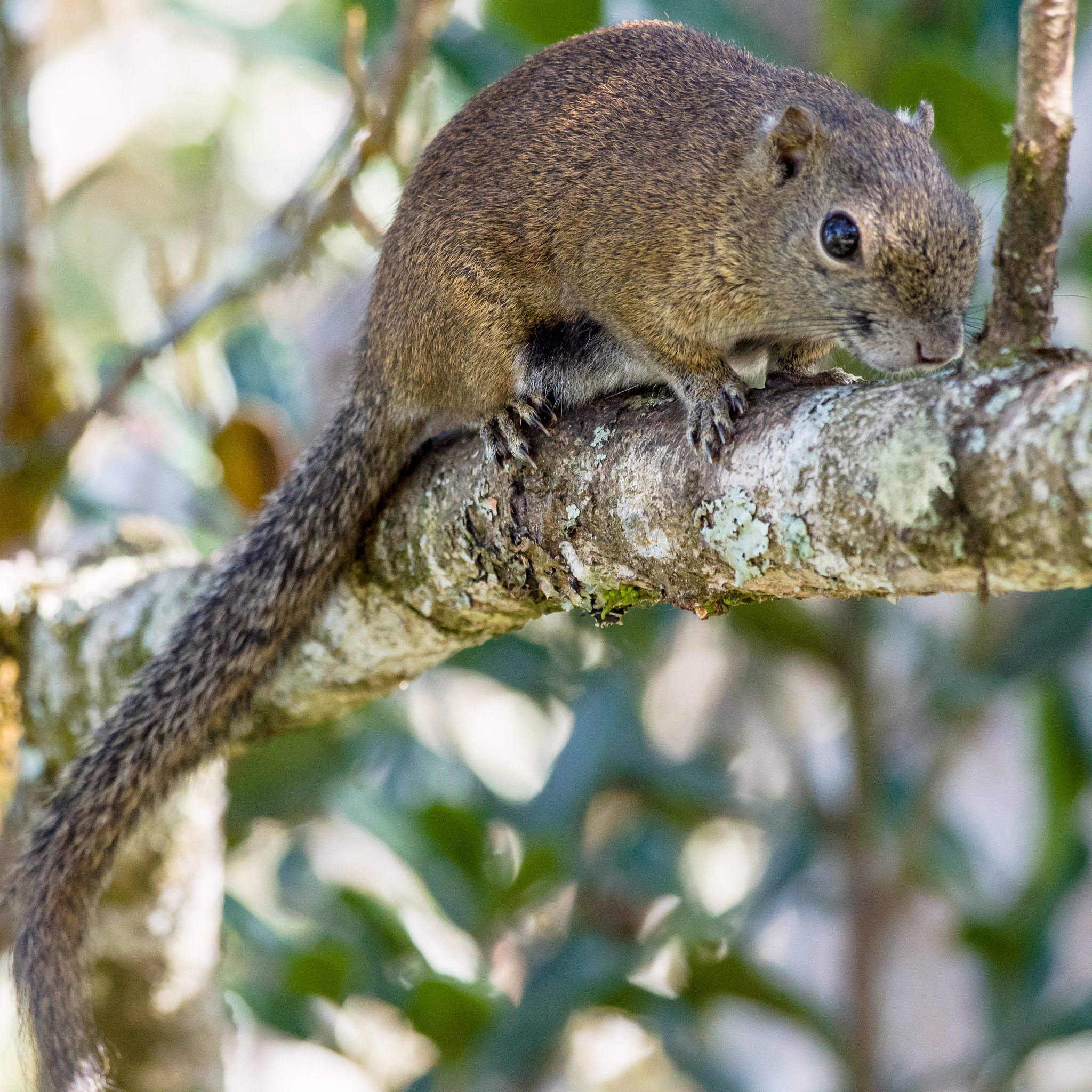
- C. orestes at Kinabalu Park, Malaysia

Conservation status
- Least Concern (IUCN 3.1)

Scientific classification
- Kingdom: Animalia
- Phylum: Chordata
- Class: Mammalia
- Order: Rodentia
- Family: Sciuridae
- Genus: Callosciurus
- Species: C. orestes

Binomial name
- Callosciurus orestes (Thomas, 1895)
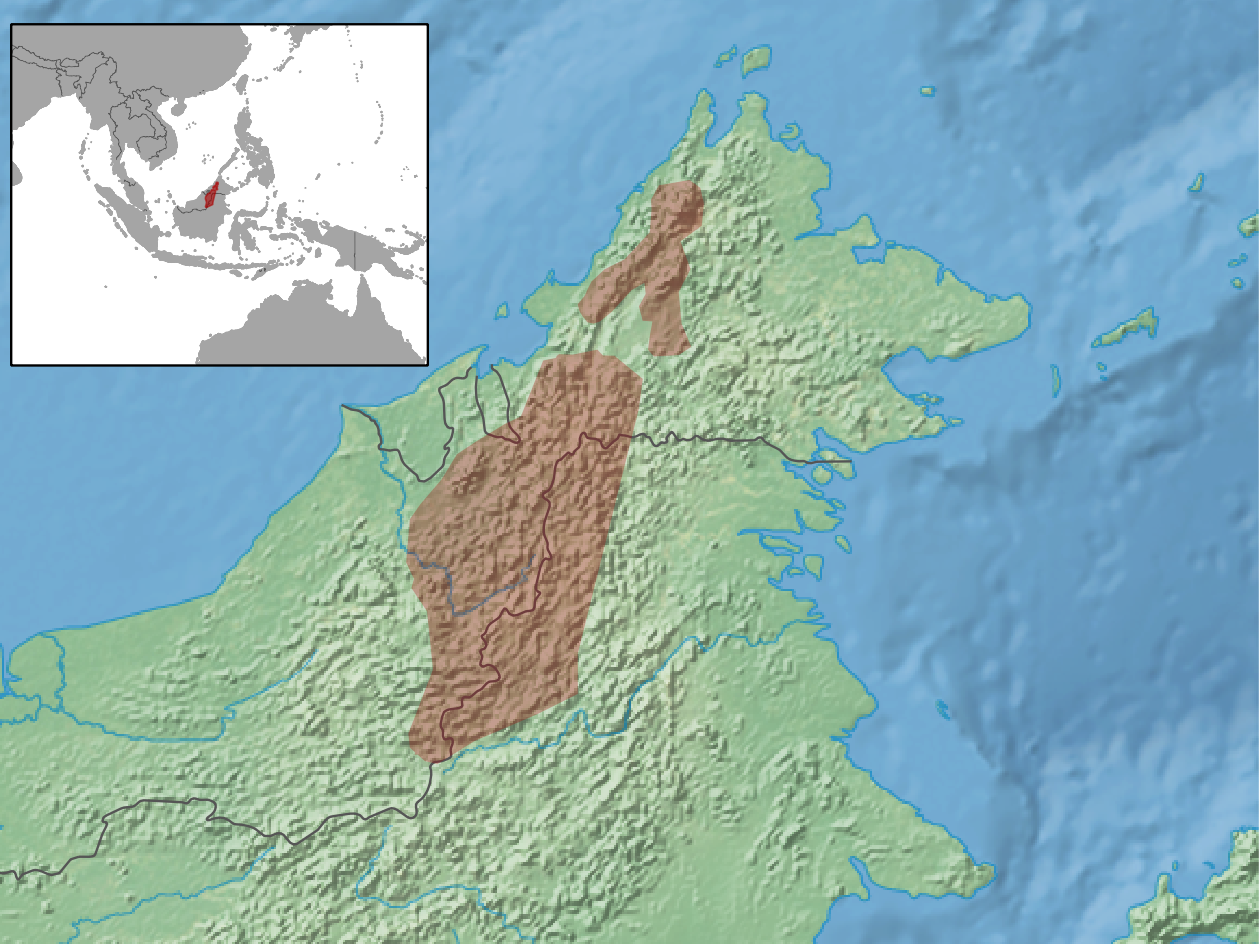

= Borneo black-banded squirrel =

Species of "beautiful" squirrel from Borneo

The Borneo black-banded squirrel (Callosciurus orestes) is a species of rodent in the family Sciuridae. It is endemic to northern Borneo.

== Distribution ==
This species is found in northern Borneo at middle elevations (Payne et al. 1985). It was known from G. Dulit (above 1,000 metres (3,300 ft)) and reported from similar altitude on Usun Apau, the Kelabit Highlands and the upper S. Terusan, all montane localities in northern Sarawak. It was also known from Mount Kinabalu (1,000–1,700 metres (3,300–5,600 ft)) and Mount Trusmadi (about 1,500 metres (4,900 ft)) in Sabah. It appears to be restricted to lower montane forest and to upper dipterocarp forest.

== Behaviour and ecology ==
The upper part is finely speckled brown. A pale buffy spot behind each ears. The underside is grey, sometimes with a reddish tinge. It also has a black and buffy-white side stripe. Callosciurus orestes is diurnal. They are active in small to medium-sized trees. Recently, fruit and black ants were found out in the two species of Mount Kinabalu.

== Conservation status ==
Based on The IUCN Red List Threatened Species, Callosciurus orestes is of Least Concern. It is listed as Least Concern as it is a middle montane species with a wide range. Some forest loss is occurring but not enough to list as Near Threatened.
