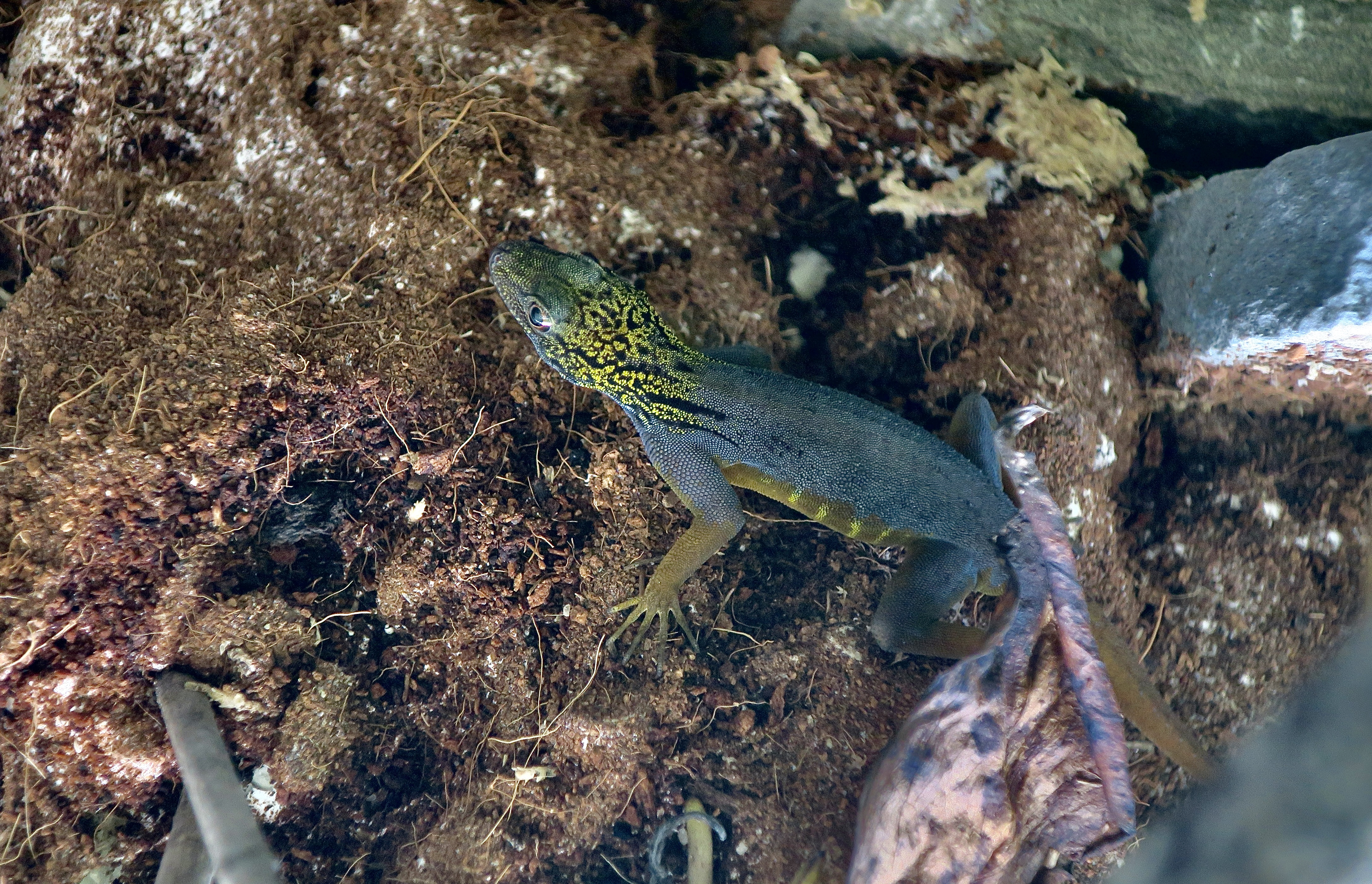

Conservation status
- Endangered (IUCN 3.1)
- CITES Appendix I

Scientific classification
- Kingdom: Animalia
- Phylum: Chordata
- Class: Reptilia
- Order: Squamata
- Suborder: Gekkota
- Family: Gekkonidae
- Genus: Cnemaspis
- Species: C. psychedelica

Binomial name
- Cnemaspis psychedelica Grismer, Ngo & Grismer, 2010

= Cnemaspis psychedelica =

Psychedelic Rock Gecko

Species of lizard

Cnemaspis psychedelica, also known as the psychedelic rock gecko (Tac ke duoi vang in Romanized Vietnamese), is an endangered species of gecko, only scientifically described in 2010, and is endemic to Hon Khoai Island and adjacent Hon Tuong Isle in Vietnam. It is up to ~7.5 cm (3 in) in snout–vent length, and (as suggested by its name) it is quite brightly colored in yellow, orange, black and grey-blue.

This diurnal gecko inhabits granite boulders in densely vegetated landscapes where it retreats into crevices or under the rocks if startled. These locations also used for sleeping at night. Each female typically lays two white eggs that are attached 0.3–3.5 m (1–11.5 ft) above the ground to the underside of a rock ledge (in captivity, they will use various elevated surfaces, not just rocks) and several females may use the same location, forming a communal nest with up to ten eggs. Newly hatched young are quite dull, but the adult colours are already evident when two months old.

== Description ==
Both sexes of the psychedelic rock gecko present with a bright orange coloration of their tail, hands, feet, forelimbs and forelegs while the trunk is a blue-gray to light purple coloration. They are a relatively small gecko species with an average snout-vent length of 5.82–7.57 cm (2.3 – 3 in) and body mass of 0.70–13.6 grams. A characteristically vibrant yellow raised reticulum patterned with lengthwise black bands covers their napes, and four bright yellow vertical lines on each flank make the psychedelic rock gecko a particularly visually appealing gecko. The bright yellow and black patterned reticulum of the nape in adult geckos is specific to each individual and can be used like a fingerprint. Newly hatched geckos are not vibrantly colored as the adults until about three months of age, then they start to develop the adult patterns rapidly.

== Ecology ==
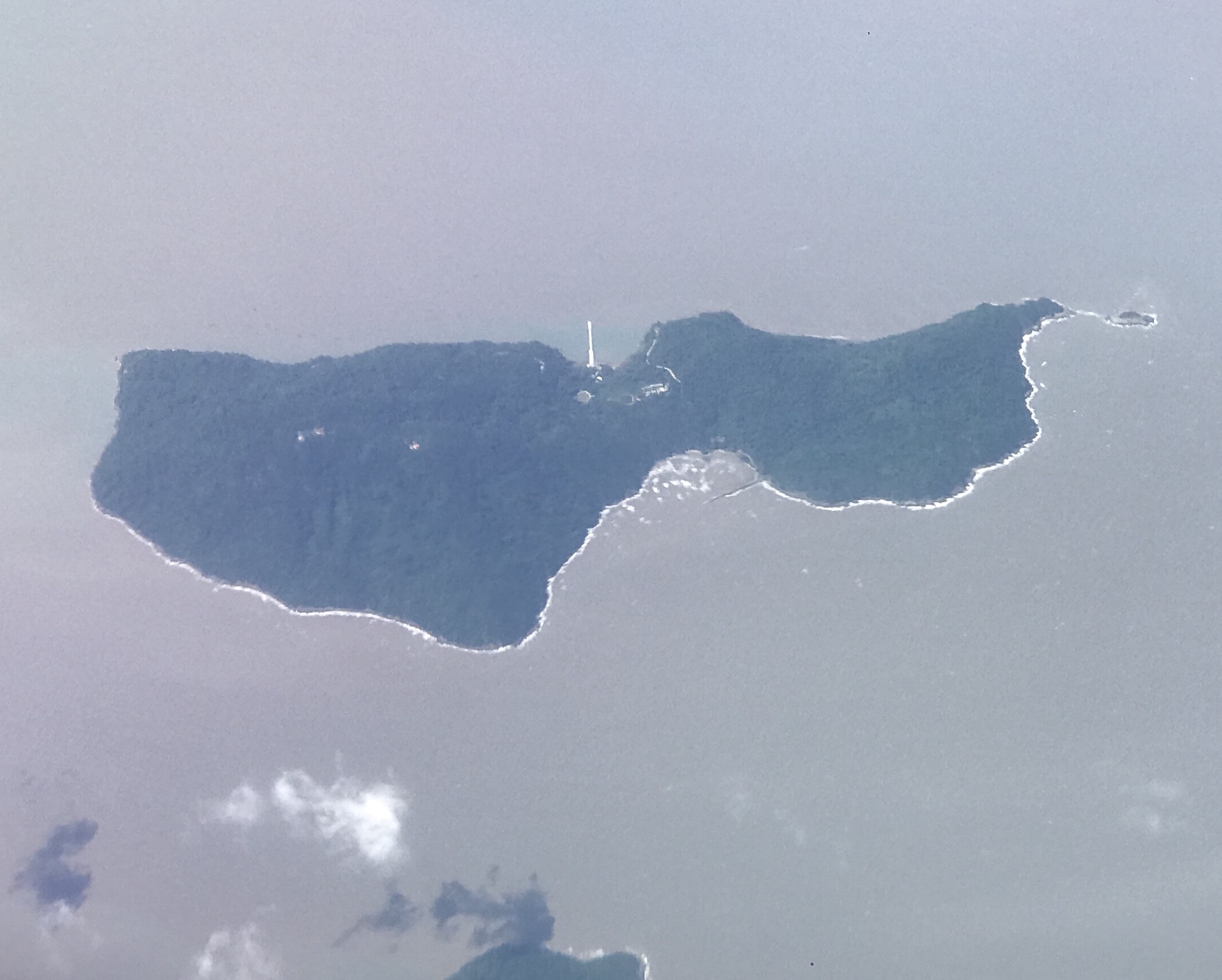
Aerial view of Hon Khoai Island, with Hon Tuong Isle below

=== Habitat and behavior ===
The psychedelic rock gecko is endemic to Hon Khoai Island (8 km^{2}) and adjacent Hon Tuong Isle (250 m^{2}) in Ca Mau Province, southern Vietnam.^{[} The islands are 18 km off the southern tip of Vietnam with 228 meters of elevation, the region has a monsoon sub-equatorial climate. Average temperature is relatively constant year round at 29.1 °C ± 0.75 °C (84.38 ± 1.35 °F); however, there is a distinct dry season and wet season with heavy rains. The islands have a granite rock foundation and are forested with semi-deciduous trees. Large granite boulder piles are found littered across the island and are the main microhabitats which the geckos inhabit. Microhabitat relative humidities are moderately different during the dry season, 73.3± 2.56%, and the wet season, 86.2± 6.1%.

Psychedelic rock geckos are diurnal and are active during the day year round, but they show different preferences during the dry season vs the wet season. For example, in the rainy wet season the geckos were most commonly found in the crevices of boulder piles, 61.5% of the time. When outside of the crevices for the remainder 38.5% of the time they were found mainly on the granite boulders or cliff sides, but never on branches or the ground. During the dry season the geckos only spent 43.3% of their time in the crevices and while outside they would mainly be found on the cliffs and secondarily on the boulders and tree leaves.

Other behaviors are unaffected by seasonality. One such behavior is perch height from the forest floor. This species displays preferences for perch height and when surveyed were found 0.71± 0.6 m (2.33± 1.97 ft) above the ground regardless of season and the adult geckos perch significantly higher than the juveniles, ~0.15 m (0.5 ft) more. Both adults and juveniles prefer the granite boulders to occupy but if not available the adults tend more towards the cliffs while the juveniles tend more towards trees. Psychedelic rock geckos are clearly dependent on the granite boulder piles of the islands but also on canopy cover provided by the semi-deciduous forest. The geckos are almost always found under the canopy's shade, most especially during the dry season's direct sunlight. Given the opportunity to reside on one half of a boulder in direct sunlight or on the other half, covered by canopy shade, the geckos almost always choose the shaded side.

=== Population density ===
A study conducted on Hon Khoai Island found that the population density of the gecko was dependent on the seasonal variations. It was shown that during the wet season the population density was found to be 120 individuals per km/transect, while in the dry season it was 192 individuals per km/transect.

=== Reproduction ===
Pregnant female psychedelic rock geckos normally produce two eggs at once. Within a naturally formed crevice in the granite boulder pile, she will find an overhang and adhere her eggs on a granite slab. The egg deposition sites also normally have good coverage by plants/vegetation and by laying eggs in such crevices the eggs are never exposed to direct sunlight. The eggs look like two cotton balls as they are small, 1.2 - 1.4mm × 1.0 - 1.2mm, with round shape and white color at first then turn pinkish over time and end a bit gray before hatching.

Psychedelic rock geckos display communal nesting and potential guardian behaviour of nesting sites. A nest site can consist of up to 10 eggs deposited by five different mothers, usually 0.3m - 3.5m (1 – 11.5 ft) above the ground. The same nesting site will be used even after previous eggs have hatched, leaving remnants of shell behind. Nesting sites also tend to cluster near each other, so under one overhang there may be multiple communal nesting sites spaced at minimum 25 cm (9.84 in) apart, with up to 10 eggs each making a communal nesting area. The communal nesting area crevice will commonly be occupied by mostly adult geckos. Currently the most geckos occupying/guarding one communal nesting area was 23 geckos (nine adult males, nine adult females, and five juveniles) by Ziegler et al. (2016). That is many individuals in close proximity, and other adult geckos outside often show preference to perch at heights similar to the communal nesting area height.

=== Diet ===
The main food source for psychedelic rock geckos is overwhelmingly invertebrates. Flushing of captured psychedelic rock gecko stomachs revealed prey consisting of 24 different invertebrate species from 20 different invertebrate orders, flatworms, and snails. Further analysis revealed the most hunted food sources were Araneae (spiders), Blattodea (cockroaches and termites), Hymenoptera (bees, wasps, ants) and Isoptera (termites). During both seasons the variety of species found from stomach flushing of geckos was similar but in the dry season the largest majority of prey found was Araneae and in the wet season the largest majority found was Hymenoptera.

== Conservation efforts ==
=== Endangered status and threats ===
While the species has a stable breeding population it has very small range, and an estimated adult population of slightly above 500 individuals. It is considered endangered by the IUCN, with the major threats being habitat loss from road construction, building of artificial ponds and developments for tourists (despite its range being in a protected area), predation by introduced long-tailed macaques and collection for the pet trade (despite being fully protected). The whole of the endemic range of the geckos is under the protection of the Ca Mau Biosphere Reserve and Hon Khoai is a protected military zone; however, psychedelic rock geckos along with other species like the endemic Vietnamese Tiger gecko and Vietnamese Crocodile Lizard still appear in the international pet trade. Advertisement and sale by Czech, Russian, and Spanish traders of psychedelic rock geckos in Europe began in 2013. Alarmingly, in 2014 a pair of psychedelic rock geckos sold for €2,500 - €3,500.

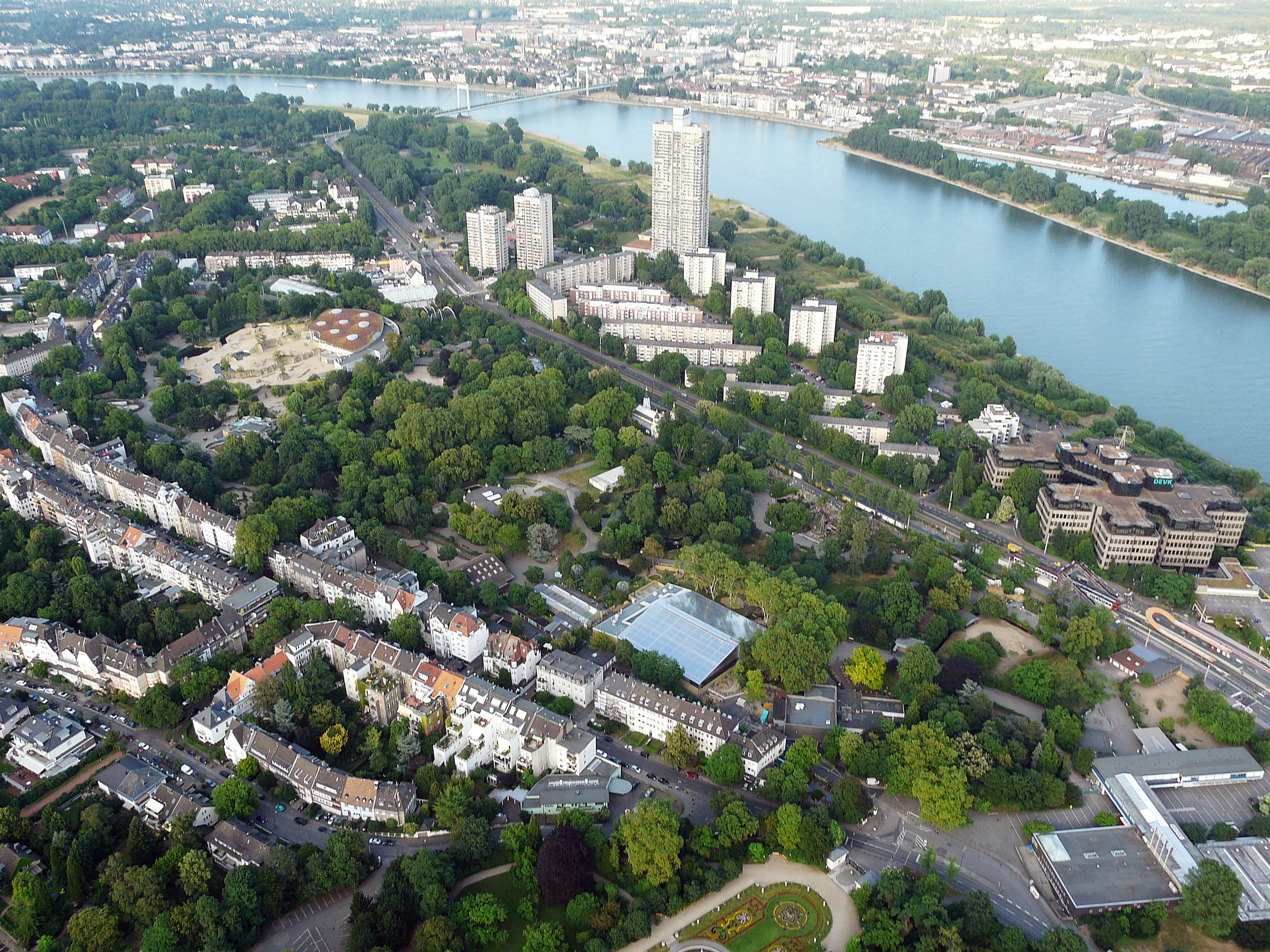
Aerial view of Cologne Zoo

In an effort to conserve psychedelic rock geckos, a captive breeding project supported by the Cologne Zoo of Germany was initiated at Hon Me Station on Hon Khoai Island in 2014 to develop a reserve population. Initial trials in the breeding facility indicated the species was well-suited for a captive breeding project and the first young were hatched at the station in early 2015. Additionally, ranger equipment and posters highlighting the gecko's status have been provided to the local forest protection department.

=== Breeding facility results and outlook ===
The first geckos were brought to the Hon Me Station breeding facility in April/May 2015 where breeding groups of two or three geckos were placed into each of 10 terrariums. The introduction was successful and within a few days the keepers were able to feed the geckos beetle larvae and crickets along with vitamins/minerals. Analysis of the geckos' feces revealed parasitic infection by nematodes (oxyurids, heterakis) and a protozoa (coccidians) which were treated with fenbendazole and toltrazuril. Later in May 2015, the first batches of eggs were laid; unfortunately, many of the eggs were cannibalized by the parents so the keepers decided to remove future batches and isolate them in separate containment.

In July 2015 the station had the first successful hatchings but many of the hatchlings presented malformations and died shortly. In response, the keepers began feeding the adult geckos a wider variety of insects along with increased vitamins and minerals. Their efforts were not in vain as on December 4 of 2015 a healthy gecko was hatched. Subsequent hatches went well and gave a promising outlook for a successful breeding program. With continued success in the future it may be possible to run a conservation breeding program to protect the genetic diversity of this endangered species.

=== Unique identification method ===
According to CITES Res. Conf. 12.10 (Rev. CoP15), specimens of Appendix I, a captive breeding project, like Hon Me Station, needs to have the capability to uniquely mark each individual gecko to be a registered program. Unique marking of psychedelic rock geckos is also a useful tool to fight against poaching/illegal trade because the authorities could identify individual geckos and potentially track poaching sites. These are some valuable reasons for unique identifying marking rock geckos but their small size and low body mass (0.70 –13.6 g) makes the use of conventional marking methods impractical to impossible. Laurenz R. Gewiss et al. (2021) decided to try using a relatively new technique of comparing natural color patterns on the bodies of each gecko as identifying markers.

The potential target pattern selected on C. psychedelica was the raised yellow reticulum on the nape of all psychedelic rock geckos and the black banding pattern within it. In the study, 12 adult geckos from the Hon Me Station breeding facility were selected and their napes were photographed over the course of 3 – 5 years. The images were analyzed for pattern uniqueness and stability by a software named APHIS, originally made for identifying lizard/salamander species, and another software named WildID, originally made for giraffe spots pattern recognition. As a final check, results were manually verified by eye comparison of the photos to see if the software was successful or not.

The results showed WildID successfully identified the geckos every time except once. APHIS made many errors and was deemed unfit for use with C. psychedelica, and manual eye checks of the photos turned out to be very effective and worked every time. Results showed the raised yellow reticulum and black banding patterns are effective as unique identifiers for each gecko, similar to a fingerprint. The study showed stability of the pattern in adult geckos over the course of 3–5 years but the question of lifetime stability still remains until a longer test can be performed. Juvenile geckos do not have a stable pattern so this method does not work with them. Repeated testing to continue verifying the effectiveness of this method was recommended, and using the human eye is the most accurate method. This was due to inherent inconsistencies in photographs throwing off current software. The success of this photographic identification method marks a step forward in the ability of psychedelic rock gecko monitoring and conservation. The establishment of a database with images from wild, captively bred, and confiscated psychedelic rock geckos can be used by conservationists and authorities to more efficiently help this endangered species.
