= Mentawai squirrel =

Conservation status
- Vulnerable (IUCN 3.1)

Scientific classification
- Kingdom: Animalia
- Phylum: Chordata
- Class: Mammalia
- Order: Rodentia
- Family: Sciuridae
- Genus: Callosciurus
- Species: C. melanogaster

Binomial name
- Callosciurus melanogaster (Thomas, 1895)

Subspecies
- C. m. melanogaster; C. m. atratus; C. m. mentawi

Species of "beautiful" squirrel from Indonesia

The Mentawai squirrel (Callosciurus melanogaster) is a species of rodent in the family Sciuridae. It is one of 20 or so species endemic to the Mentawai Islands off the west coast of Sumatra. There are three subspecies: C. m. melanogaster, C. m. mentawi, and C. m. atratus. This small isolated population is listed as "Vulnerable" by the IUCN due to habitat loss.
