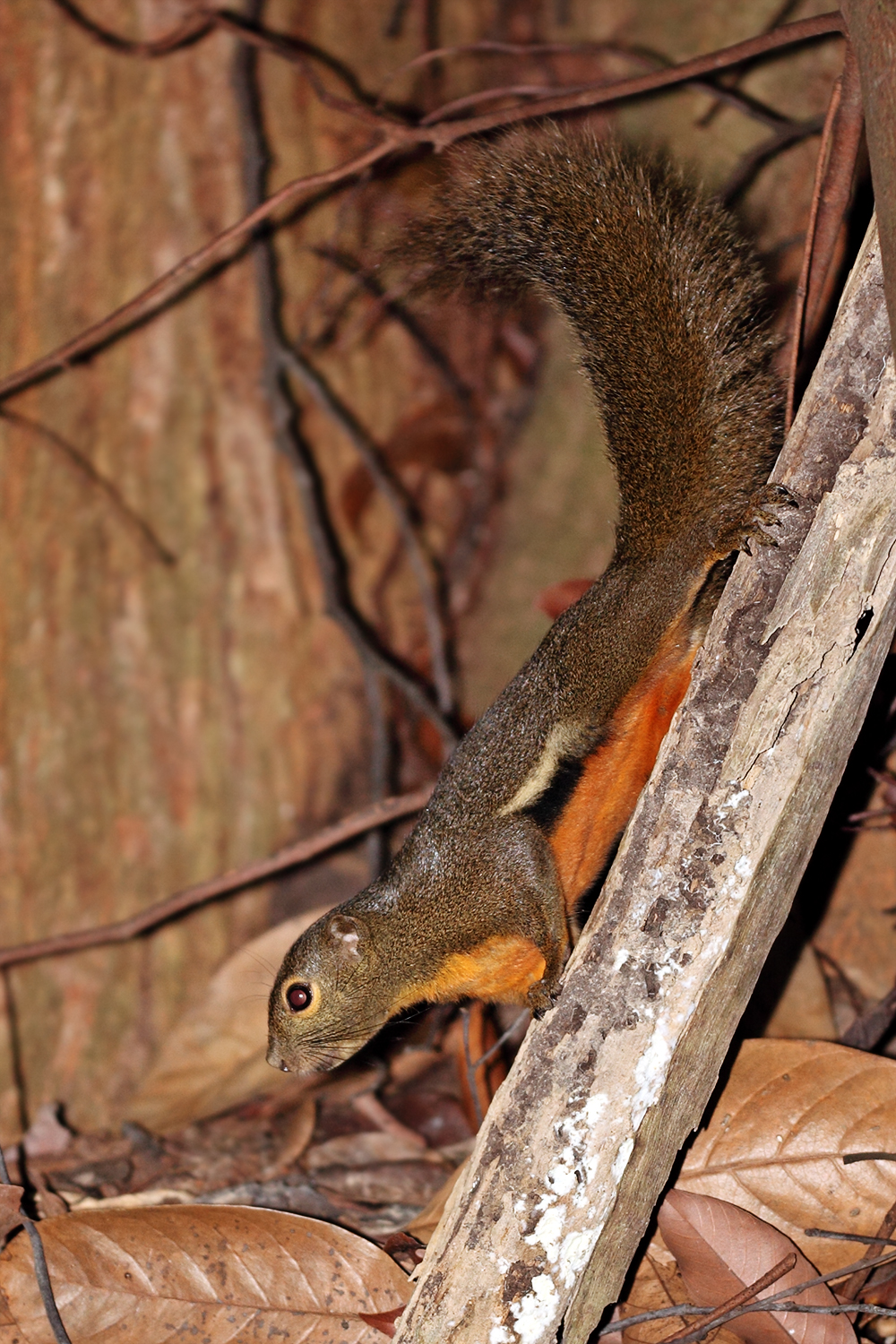

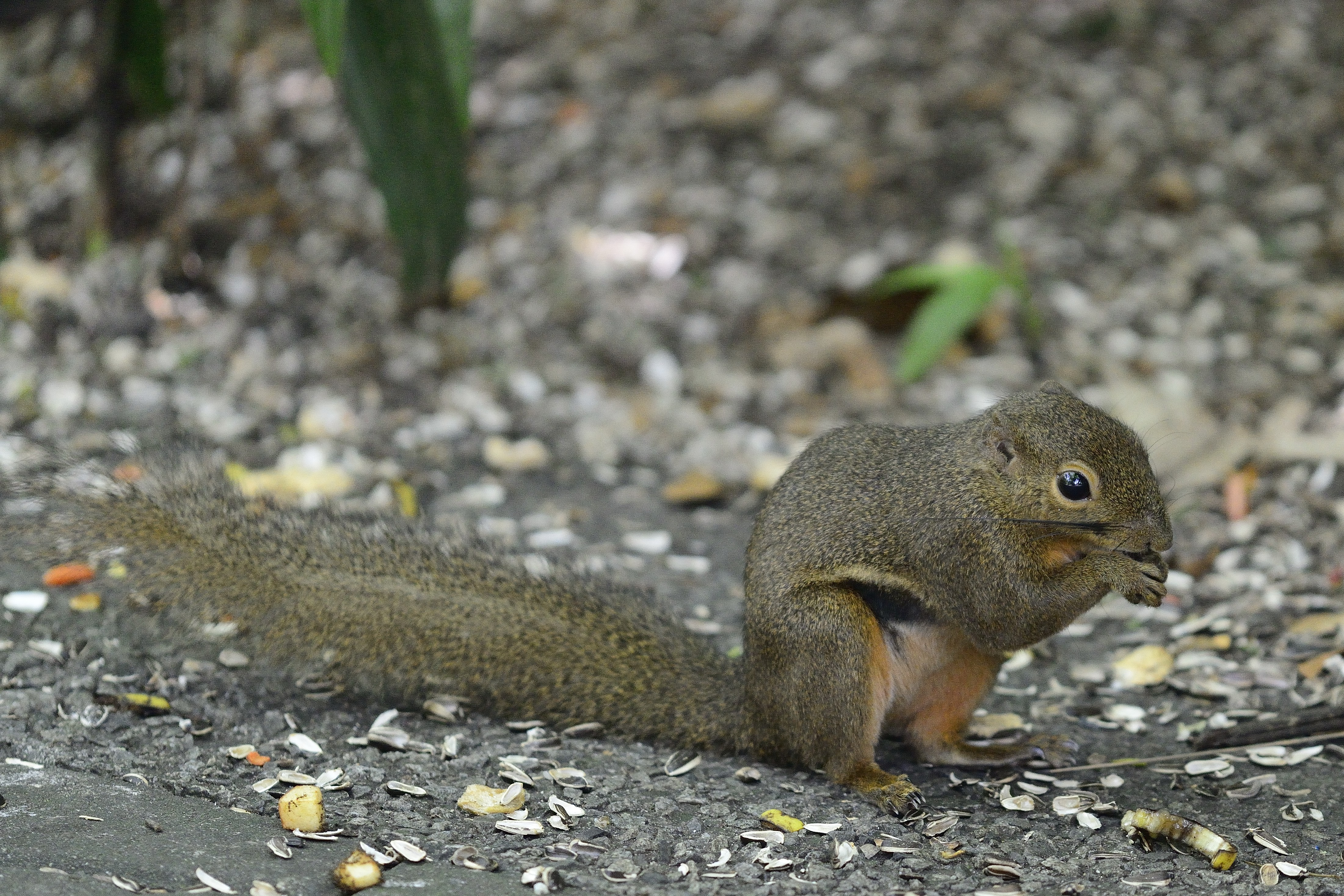

Conservation status
- Least Concern (IUCN 3.1)

Scientific classification
- Kingdom: Animalia
- Phylum: Chordata
- Class: Mammalia
- Order: Rodentia
- Family: Sciuridae
- Genus: Callosciurus
- Species: C. notatus

Binomial name
- Callosciurus notatus (Boddaert, 1785)

Subspecies
- C. n. notatus; C. n. diardii; C. n. vittatus; C. n. suffusus; C. n. miniatus
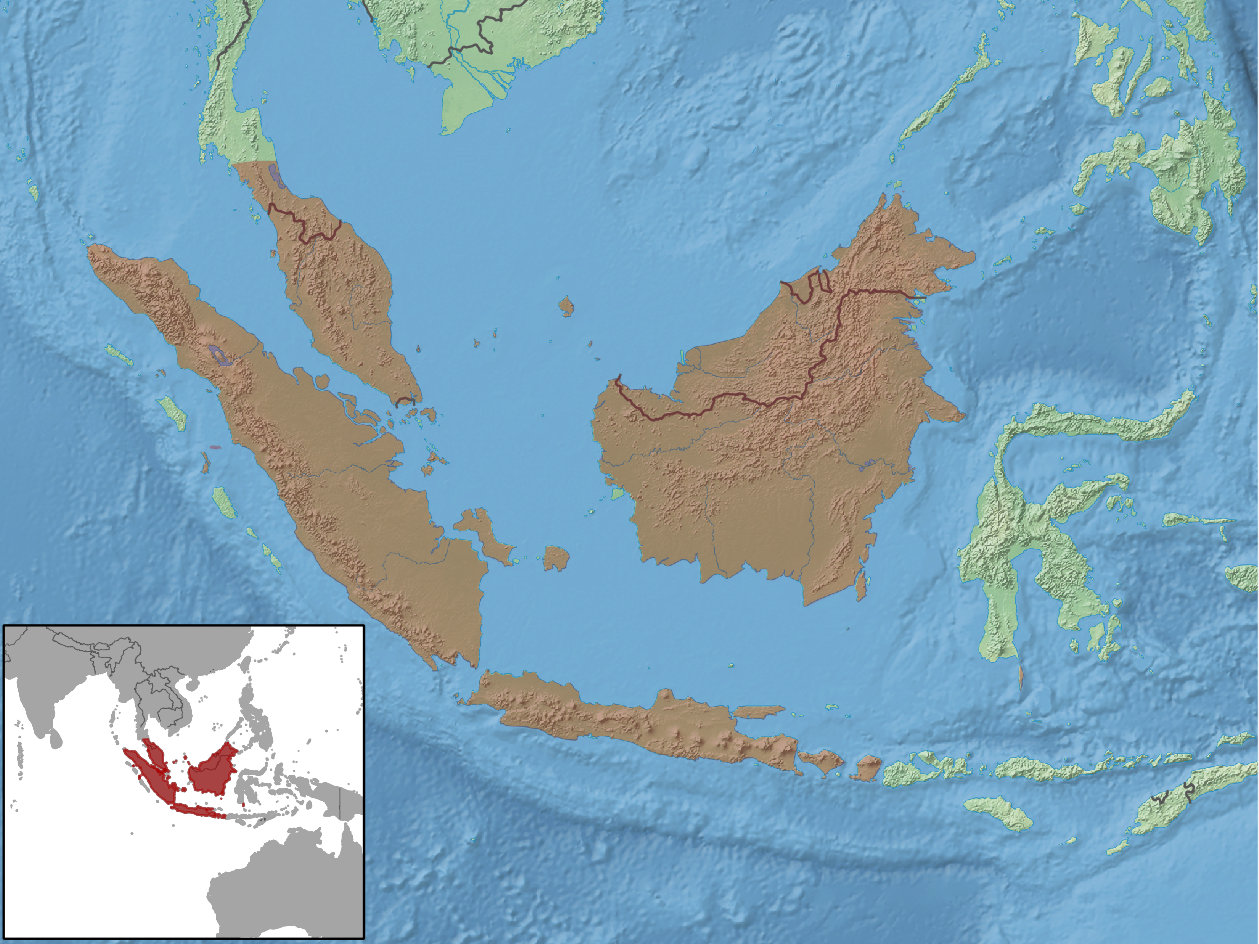
- Distribution in red

= Plantain squirrel =

Species of squirrel from Southeast Asia

The plantain squirrel, oriental squirrel or tricoloured squirrel (Callosciurus notatus) is a species of rodent in the family Sciuridae found in Indonesia, Malaysia, Singapore, and Thailand in a wide range of habitats: forests, mangroves, parks, gardens, and agricultural areas. Fruit farmers consider them to be pests.

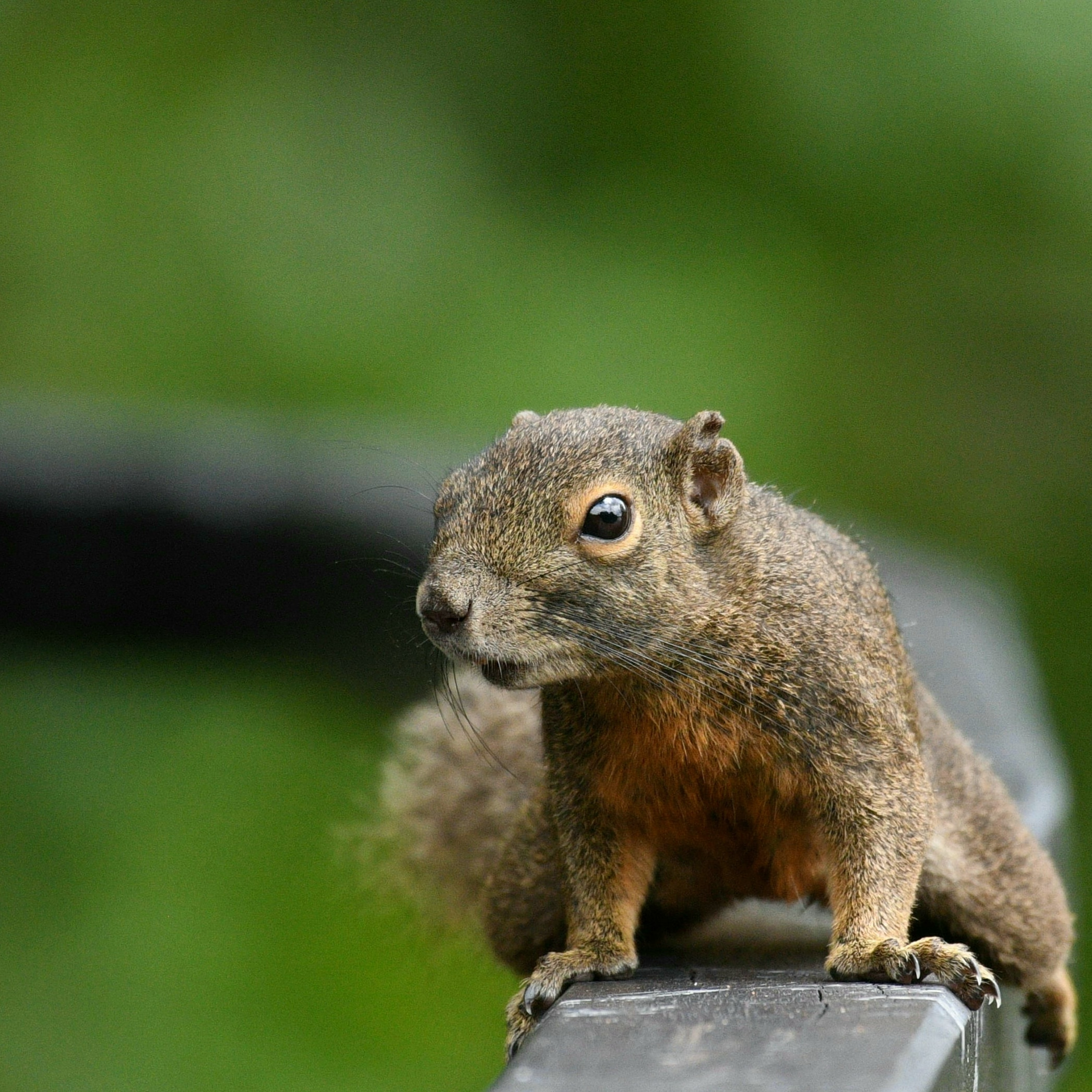
Plantain Squirrel

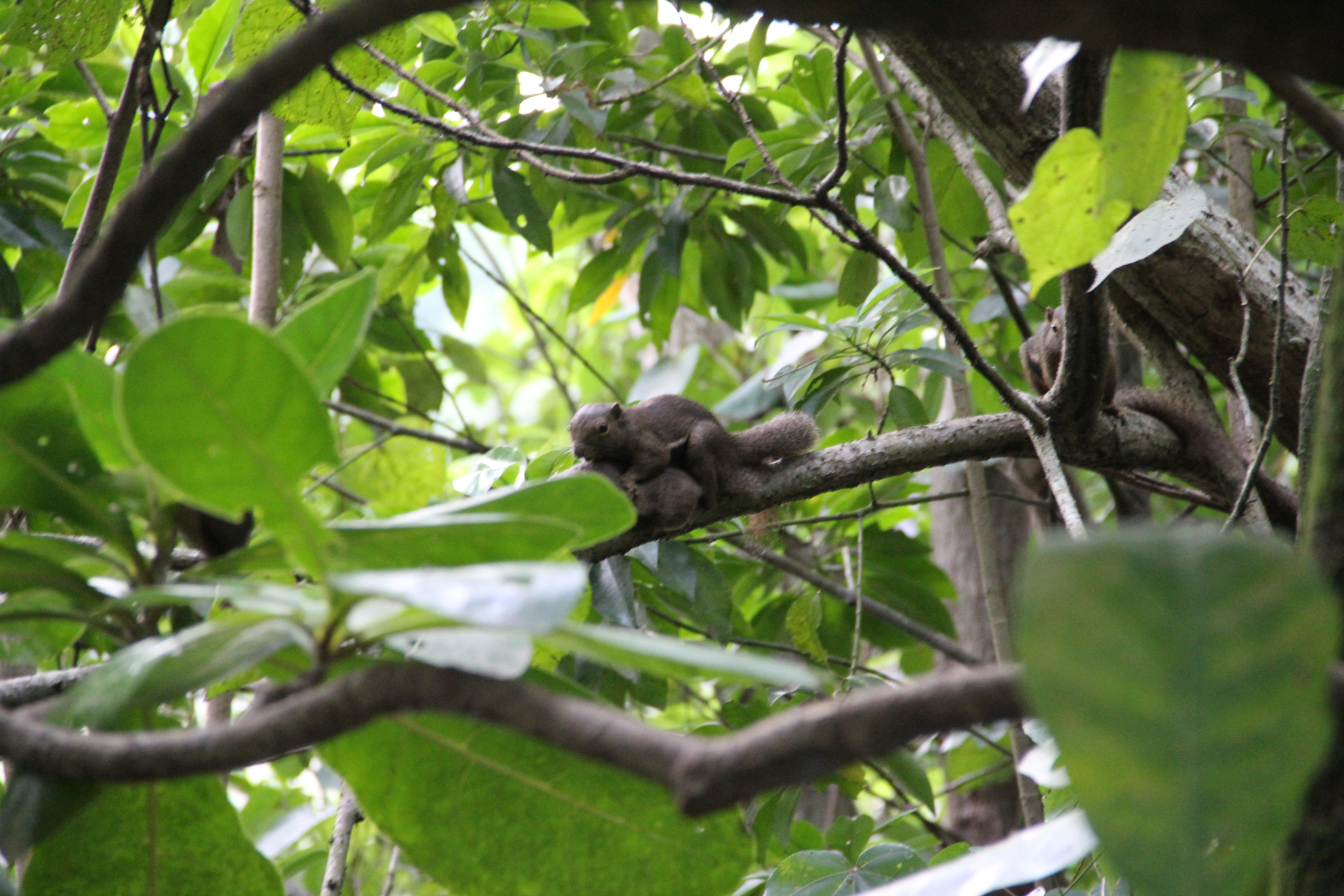
Mating pair

== Description ==
Its body is about 20–30 cm (8–12 in) long with a similar-sized tail. Its weight can vary from 160 to 259 g (5.6 to 9.1 oz). It is a greyish-brown with a chestnut belly and a black and white stripe on its sides. It is quick and agile in trees, able to jump a few metres between trees, and rarely wanders on the ground.

Like all rodents, it has two large upper and lower incisors.

Its chestnut belly easily distinguishes it from the similar black-striped squirrel, which has a grey belly.

== Behaviour ==
The plantain squirrel is diurnal. It is either solitary or social in small groups, wherein squirrels communicate with shrill chirps and chattering while showing off their tails. These high calls may be alarms responding to the presence of a predator. Different types of predators prompt different calls and elicit different responses in the squirrel. A snake alarm causes nearby squirrels to move towards the threat and mob it, while a raptor alarm causes the squirrels to freeze and take cover.

Plantain squirrels breed year round, but most often from April to June. They are promiscuous, with multiple males (usually 5 to 7) competing for a female in estrus within her home range. Two to four of the males end up mating with the female, during which time they interact by barking and chasing one another. After 40 days of gestation, the female gives birth to 1–4 (2 on average) blind and hairless young, each weighing some 16 grams. The mother houses her litter in a spherical nest of twigs and leaves high up in a tree or bush. After six weeks, the young squirrels will usually leave the nest.

== Diet ==
Its diet consists mostly of leaves and fruits, but it also eats insects and bird eggs. It is known to break open twigs that contain ant larvae to eat them. It can eat fruits much bigger than itself, such as mangoes, jackfruit, or coconuts.

== Taxonomy ==
The genus name Callosciurus means "beautiful squirrel". Kloss's squirrel (Callosciurus albescens) is sometimes considered a subspecies.
