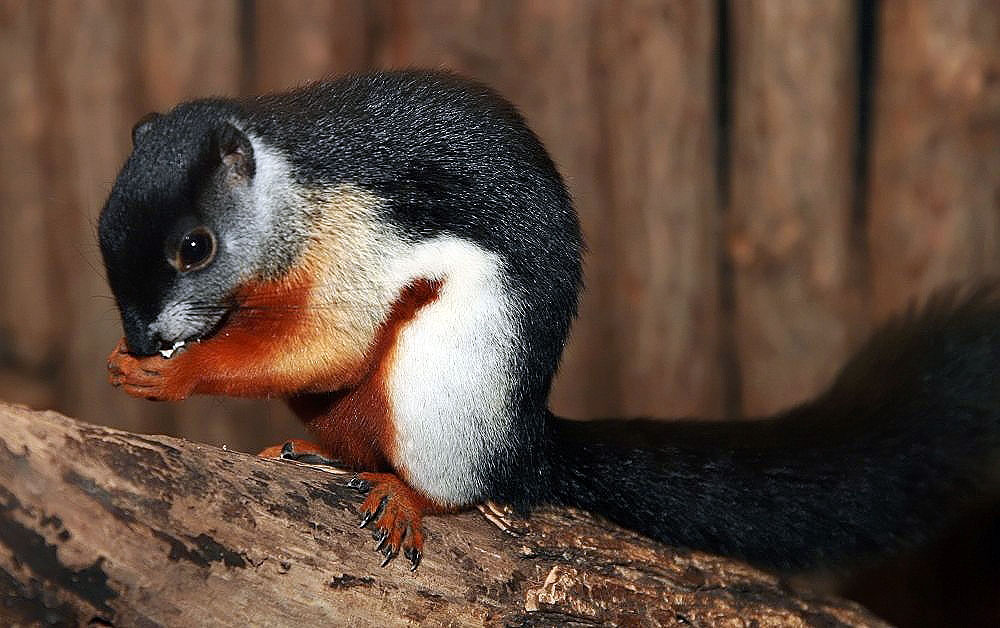
- Typical form of Prevost's squirrel

Conservation status
- Least Concern (IUCN 3.1)

Scientific classification
- Kingdom: Animalia
- Phylum: Chordata
- Class: Mammalia
- Order: Rodentia
- Family: Sciuridae
- Genus: Callosciurus
- Species: C. prevostii

Binomial name
- Callosciurus prevostii (Desmarest, 1822)

Subspecies
- See text
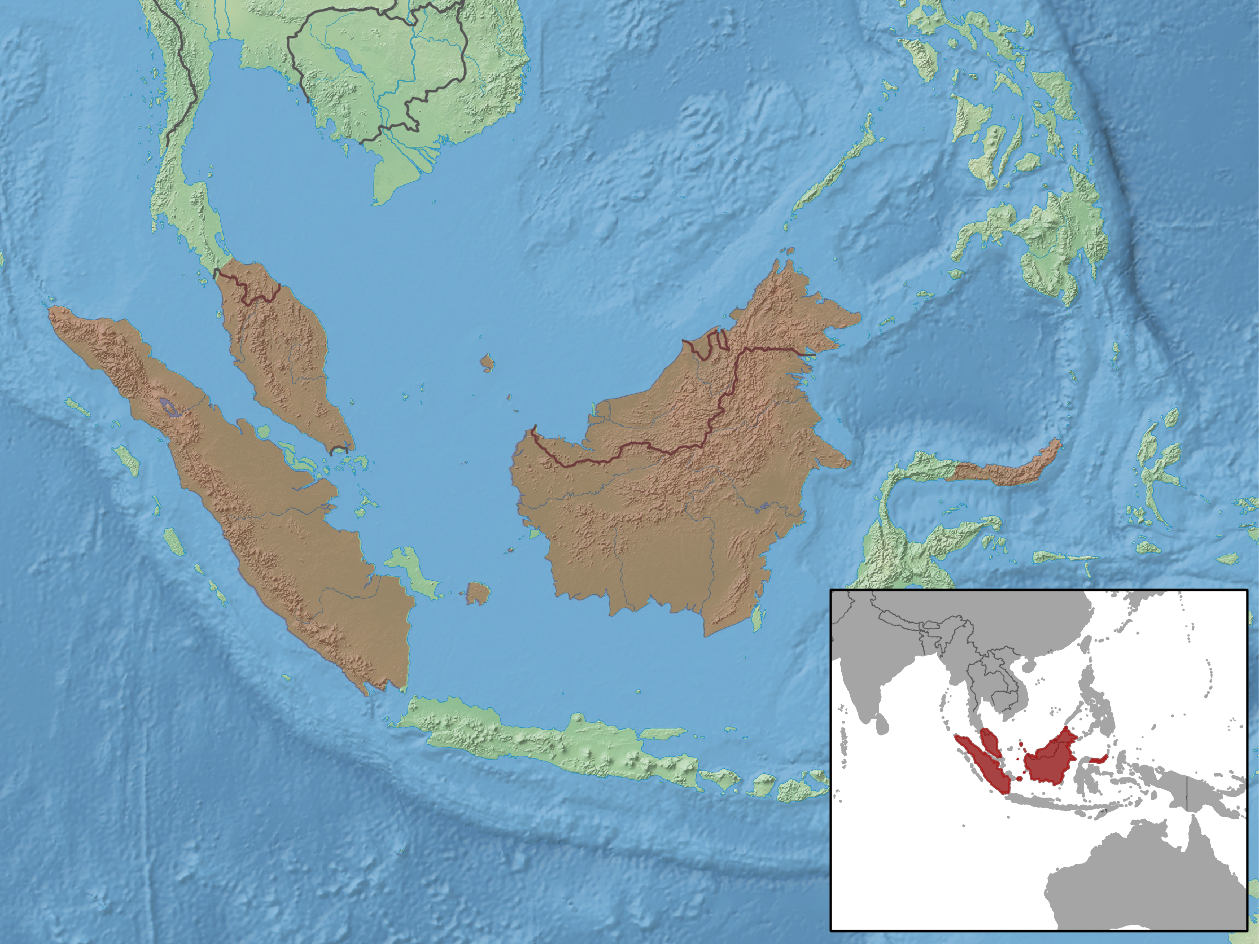
- Distribution in red

= Prevost's squirrel =

Species of "beautiful" squirrel from Southeast Asia

Prevost's squirrel (Callosciurus prevostii, English: /preɪˈvoʊ/ pray-VOH, French: [pʁevo]) or Asian tri-coloured squirrel is a colourful species of rodent in the family Sciuridae. It is found in forests in the Thai-Malay Peninsula, Sumatra, Borneo and nearby smaller islands, with an introduced population in northern Sulawesi. Although the Prevost's squirrel is declining in some regions because of habitat loss and hunting, the species is not considered threatened since it generally remains common and widespread. It can live in somewhat disturbed habitats and often visits plantations or gardens. It mostly feeds on plant material, especially fruits, but also takes insects.

== Appearance and taxonomy ==
The Prevost's squirrel is a medium-sized squirrel, but one of the larger species in its range, although clearly surpassed by the giant squirrels and giant flying squirrels of the region. The head-and-body of the Prevost's squirrel typically is 20–27 cm (8–11 in) long and the tail length is about the same; it weighs 250–500 g (9–18 oz). Individuals from small islands tend to be smaller in size than those from medium-small islands, but on large islands this pattern is reversed.

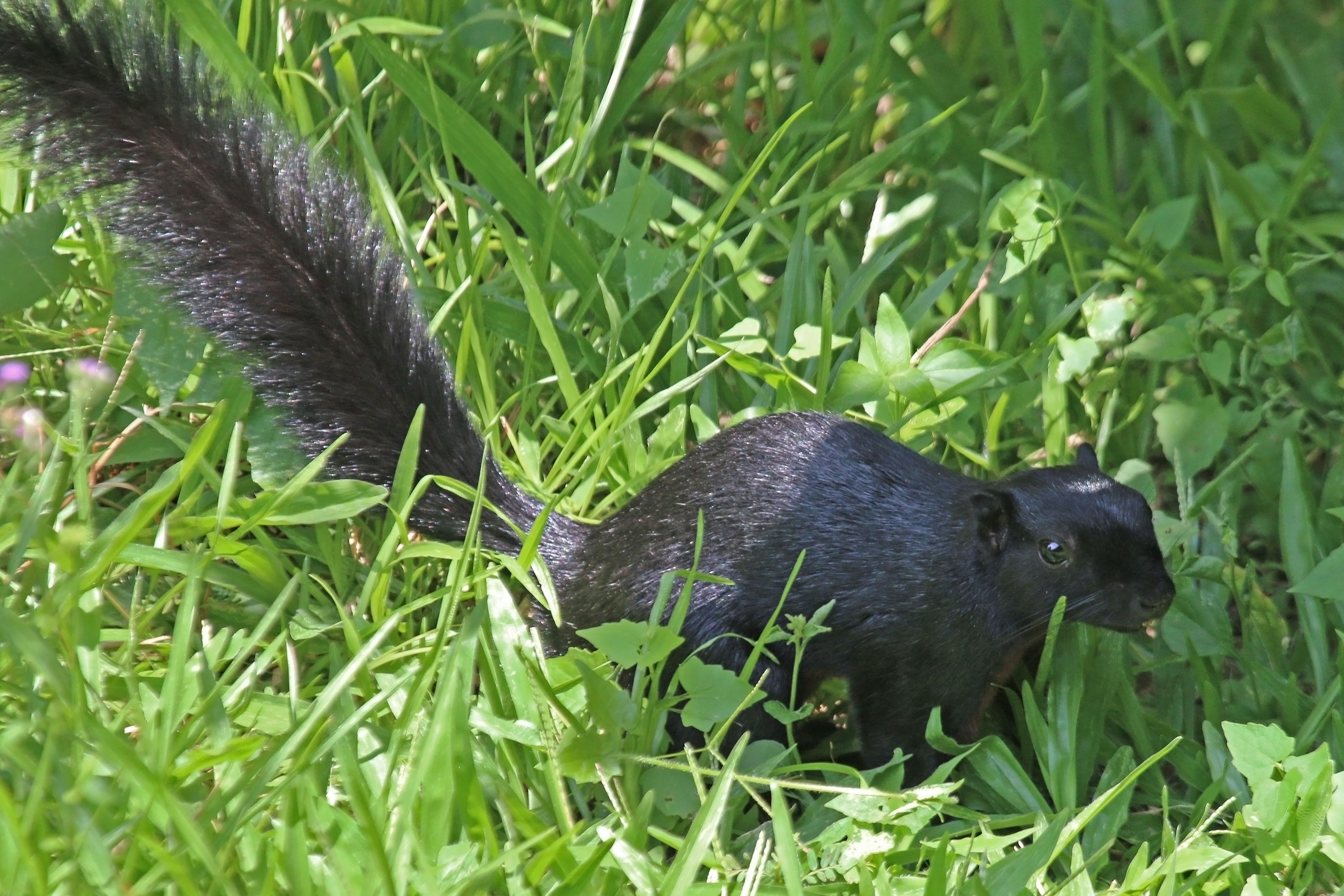
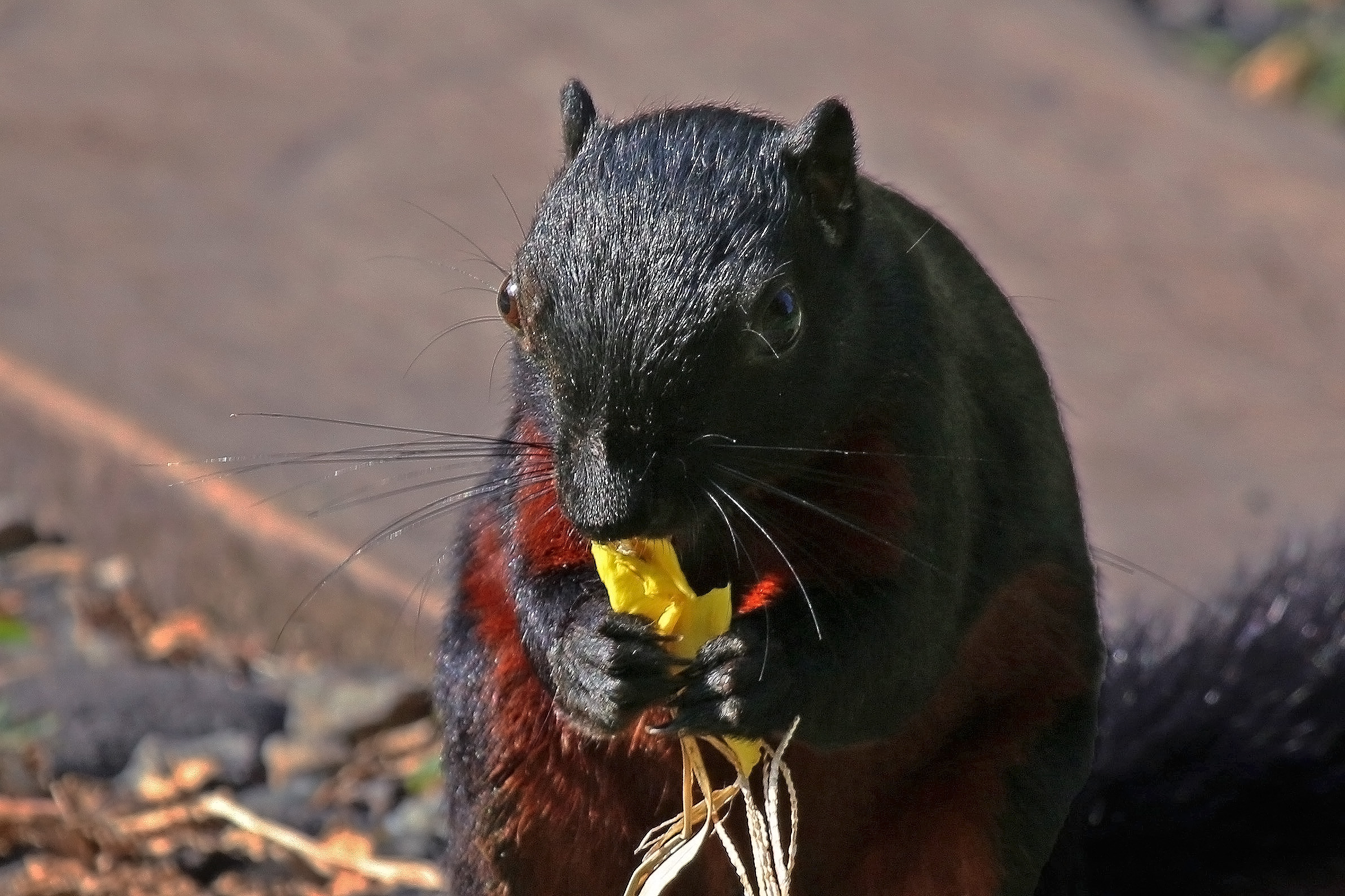
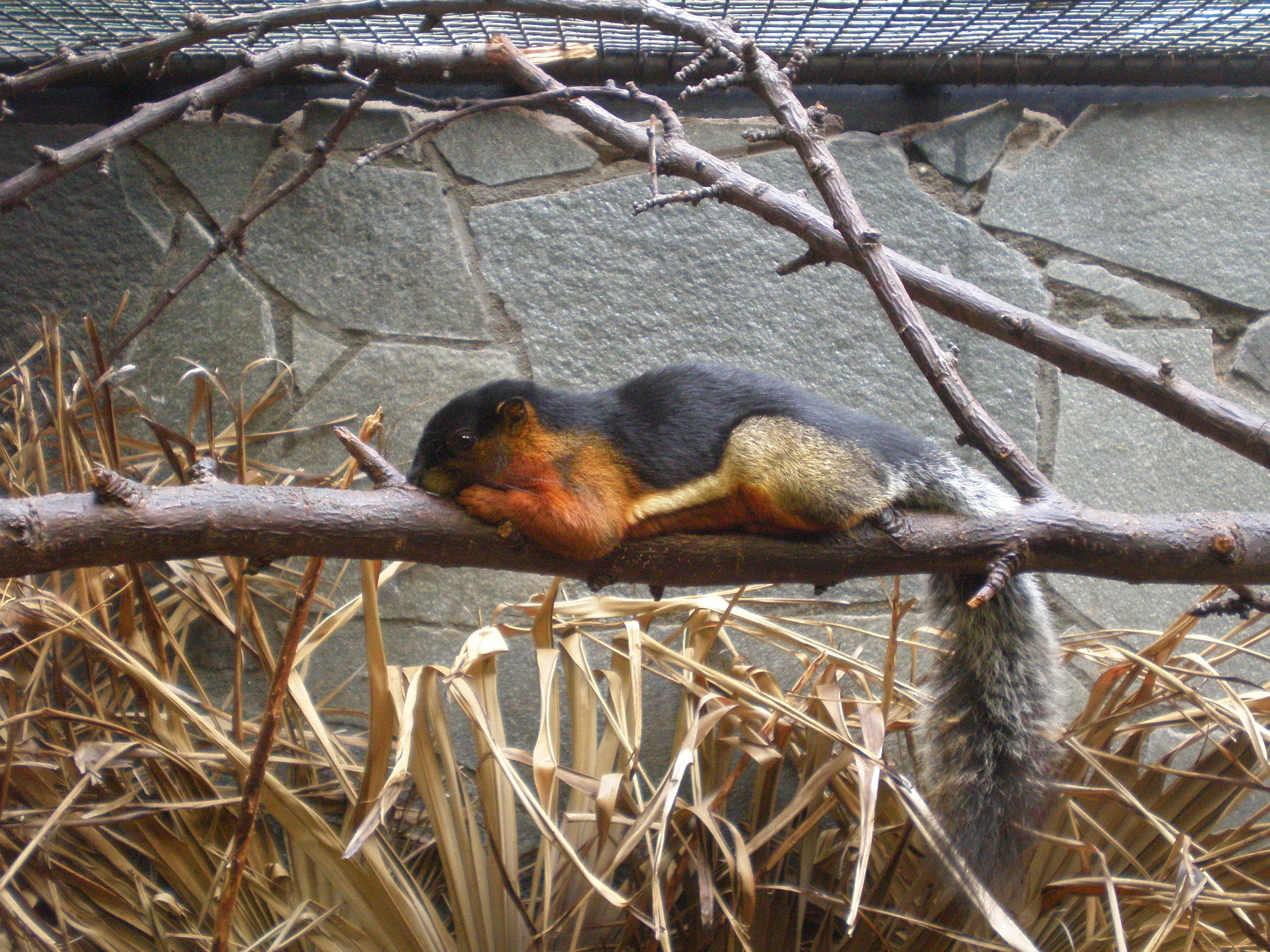
The dark subspecies C. p. pluto of northeast Borneo (top, middle), and the grey-tailed and orange-cheeked C. p. borneoensis from northwest Borneo (bottom)

In general, the subspecies of the Prevost's squirrel have been described based on their colour patterns. While there are significant geographical variations, there are also some individual variations within each region. The underparts are always reddish-orange to rich rufous. The typical form, including the subspecies of the Thai-Malay Peninsula (C. p. prevostii and others), is among the most colourful mammals in the world with its black upperparts and tail, reddish-orange underparts, whitish thighs and flanks, and grey to grey-white cheeks. Some subspecies from elsewhere are quite similar, like the grey-cheeked C. p. rafflesii of southern Sumatra and black-cheeked C. p. melanops of eastern Sumatra, as well as those from southwestern Borneo. Several others differ noticeably, especially in northern, central and eastern Borneo where some have grey or olivaceous-greyish thighs, orange cheeks, grizzled or olivaceous-greyish upperparts, or a greyish or greyish-banded tail. Four subspecies are uniquely dark and bicoloured: C. p. caedis from Banggi and nearby islands, C. p. piceus from northern Sumatra, C. p. pluto from northeastern Borneo and C. p. rufonigra from Labuan are black above, including tail, thighs and cheeks, and rich rufous below (no whitish to thighs, flanks or cheeks).

As many as 44 subspecies have been named for the Prevost's squirrel, but recent authorities have generally recognized far less. For example, in 2005 Mammal Species of the World only recognized 6, listing the rest as synonyms of these subspecies or as undefined synonyms (synonyms of the species but not associated with any subspecies). In 2012, 32 subspecies were recognized in Squirrels of the World. The situation is particularly complex in Borneo. There has been no recent detailed taxonomic review and it remains unclear how many subspecies should be recognized.

== Behaviour ==
The Prevost's squirrel is active during the day and mostly stays in trees, only occasionally moving on the ground. The 1–3 young are born after a gestation that lasts around seven weeks. The nest is made of sticks, bark and grass.

=== Feeding ===
This squirrel eats fruits, nuts, seeds, buds, flowers, insects and bird eggs. They have been observed feeding on durians such as Durio graveolens. These squirrels carry the fruits far from the tree and drop the seeds when finished with their meal. This seed distribution away from the parent plant increases survival for the fruiting plant species.
