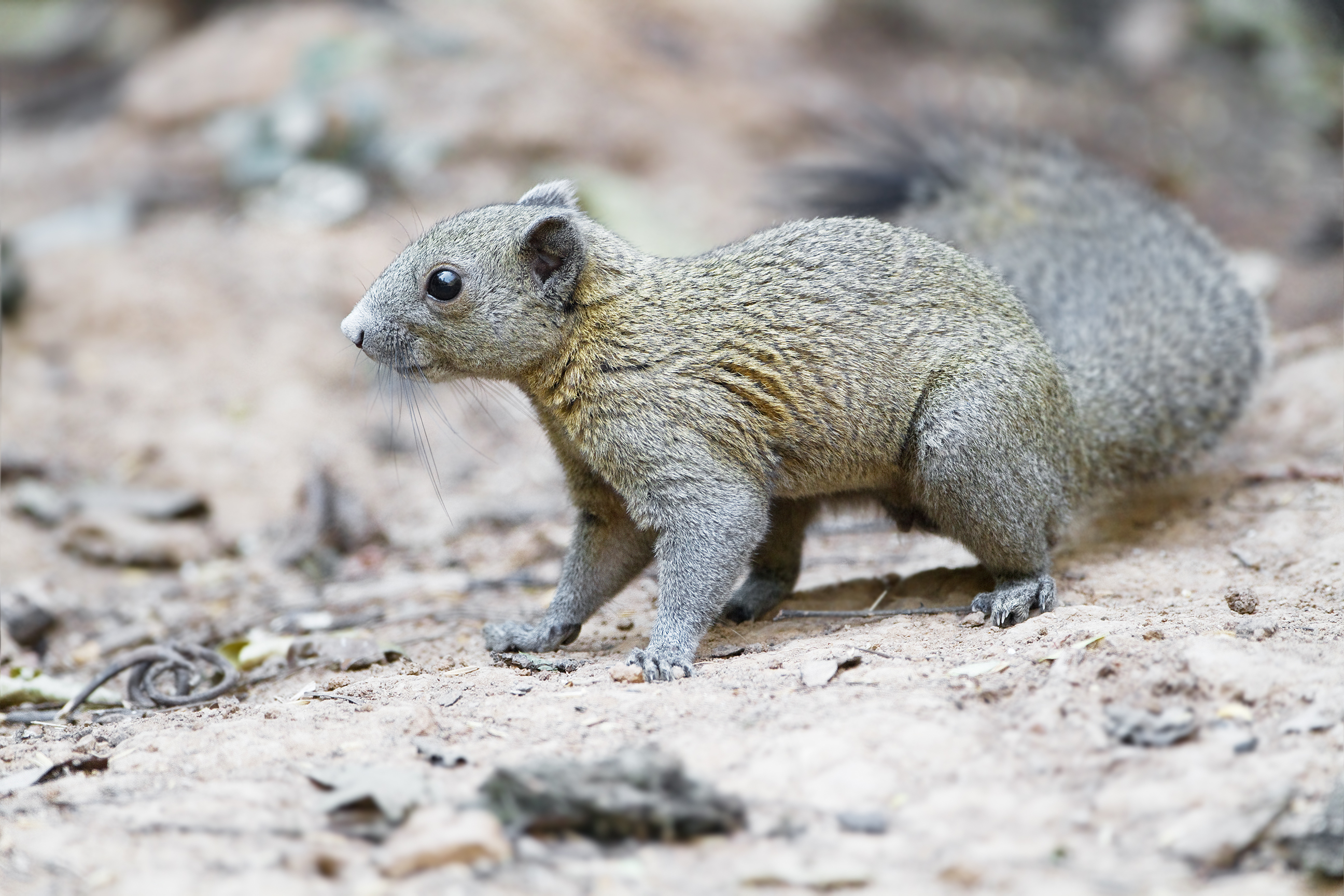

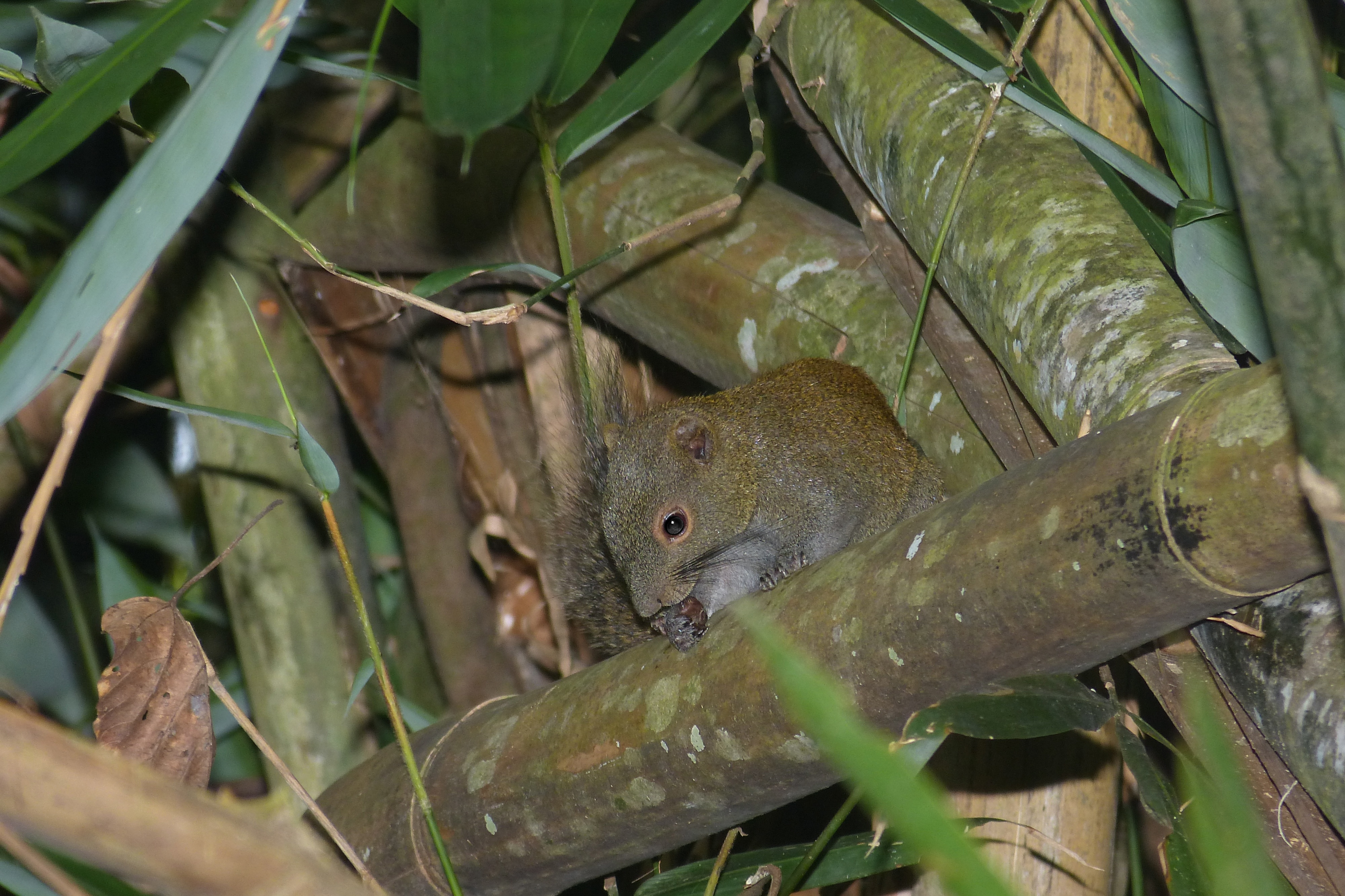
- Two variants: Above—from Kaeng Krachan, Thailand; Below—from Taman Negara, Malaysia

Conservation status
- Least Concern (IUCN 3.1)

Scientific classification
- Kingdom: Animalia
- Phylum: Chordata
- Class: Mammalia
- Order: Rodentia
- Family: Sciuridae
- Genus: Callosciurus
- Species: C. caniceps

Binomial name
- Callosciurus caniceps (J. E. Gray, 1842)

Subspecies
- C. c. caniceps; C. c. adangensis; C. c. bimaculatus; C. c. casensis; C. c. concolor; C. c. domelicus
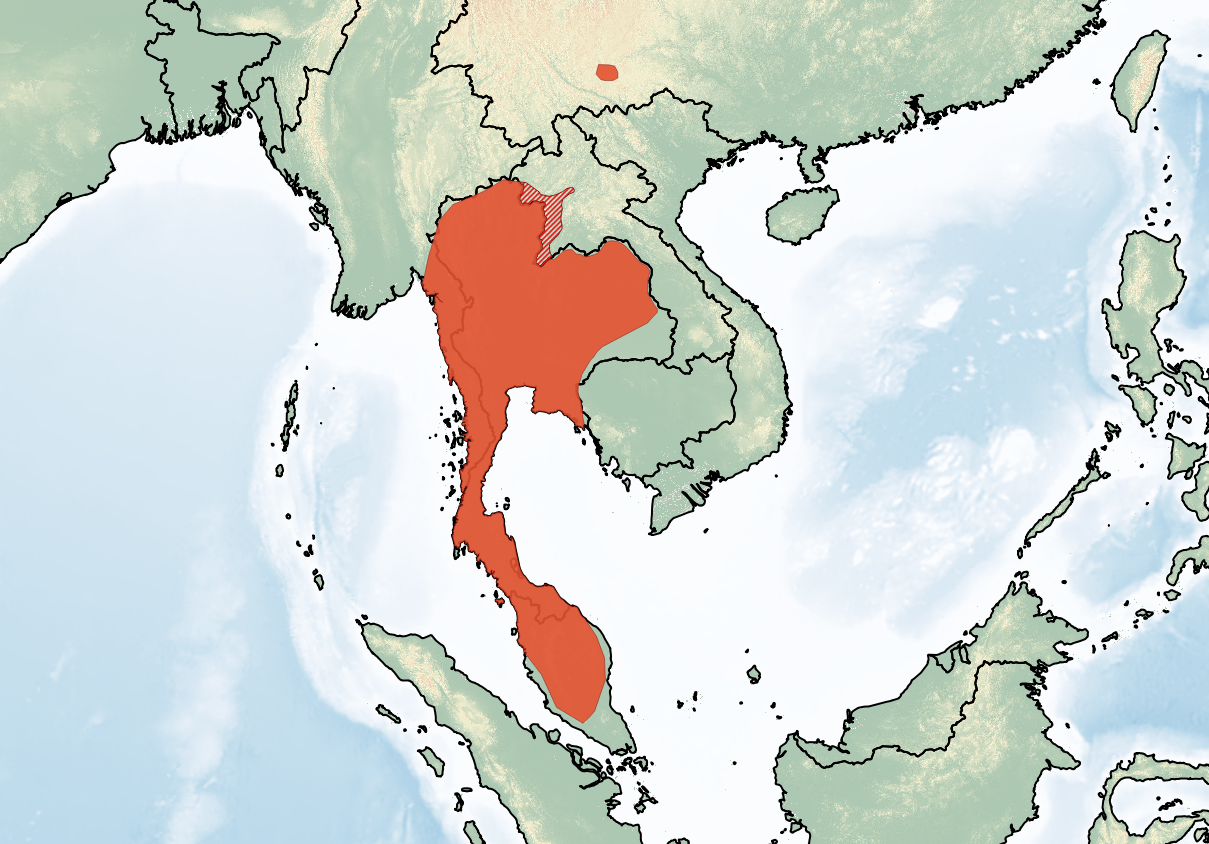

= Grey-bellied squirrel =

Species of "beautiful" squirrel from Asia

The grey-bellied squirrel (Callosciurus caniceps) is a species of rodent in the family Sciuridae. It is found in forests, plantations and gardens in Peninsular Malaysia, Thailand, southern Myanmar, southern China (Yunnan) and possibly western Laos. It has been introduced in the Ryukyu Islands in Japan. As suggested by its name, its belly is usually grey, though sometimes reddish on the sides. Depending on subspecies and season, the upperparts are grey, yellowish-olive or reddish.

== Weight ==
Rudd (1965) gave the weights of 2 adult males trapped in Malaysia as follow : 247.7 and 251.5 g.
