= Hon Khoai =

Island in Vietnam

Coordinates: 8°26′N 104°50′E

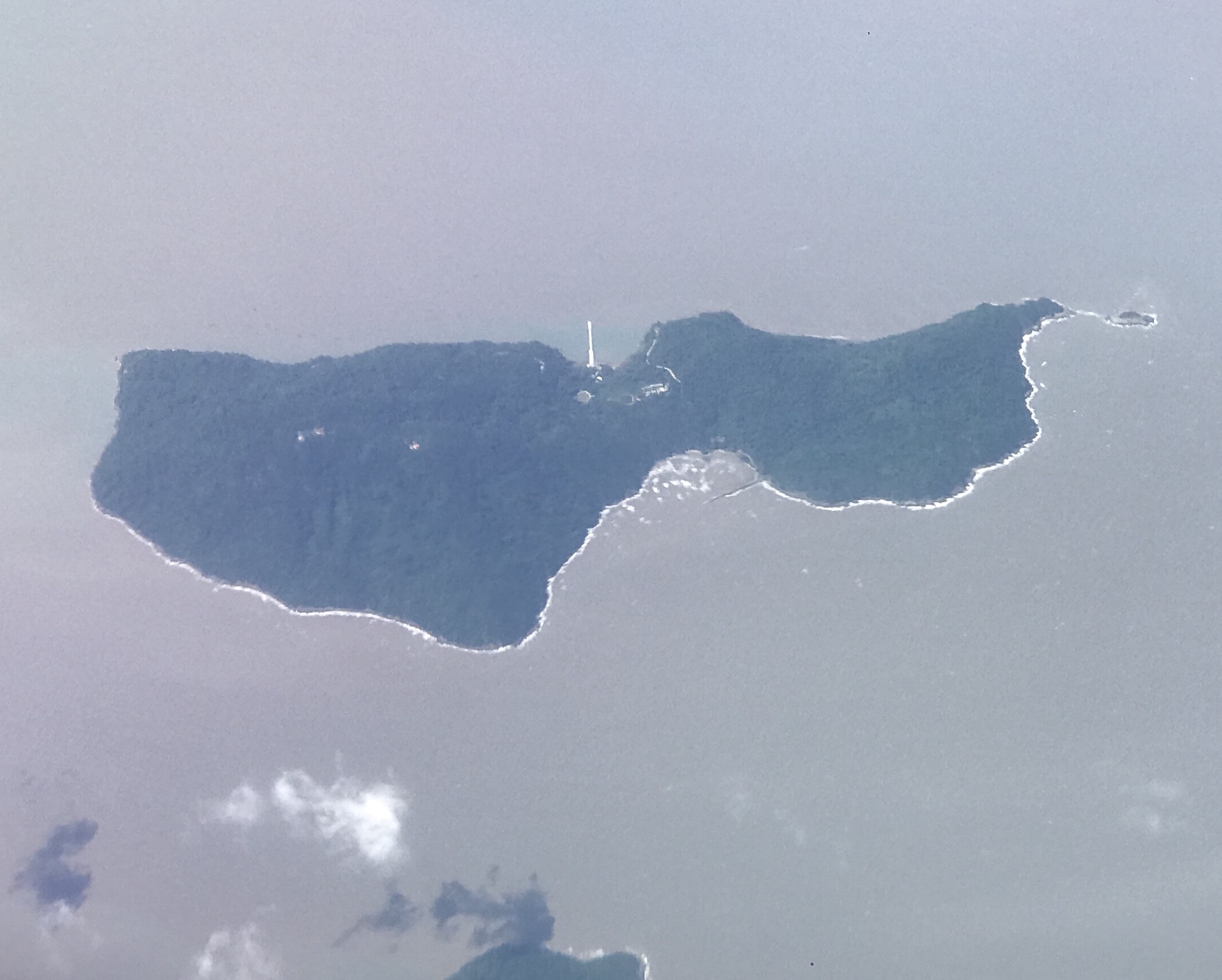
Aerial photo of Hon Khoai island.

Hon Khoai (also called Ile Independence or Paulo Obi, Pulo Ubi) is a small archipelago located about 14 kilometers south from Ca Mau province, Vietnam. It is considered to be the southernmost point of Vietnam. The Hon Khoai islands consist of the main island of Hon Khoai, the smaller island Hon Sao and the islets of Hòn Đồi Mồi, Hòn Đá Lẻ and Hòn Tương. This tiny island group is home to several endemic species, including the Hon Khoai squirrel and the psychedelic rock gecko.
