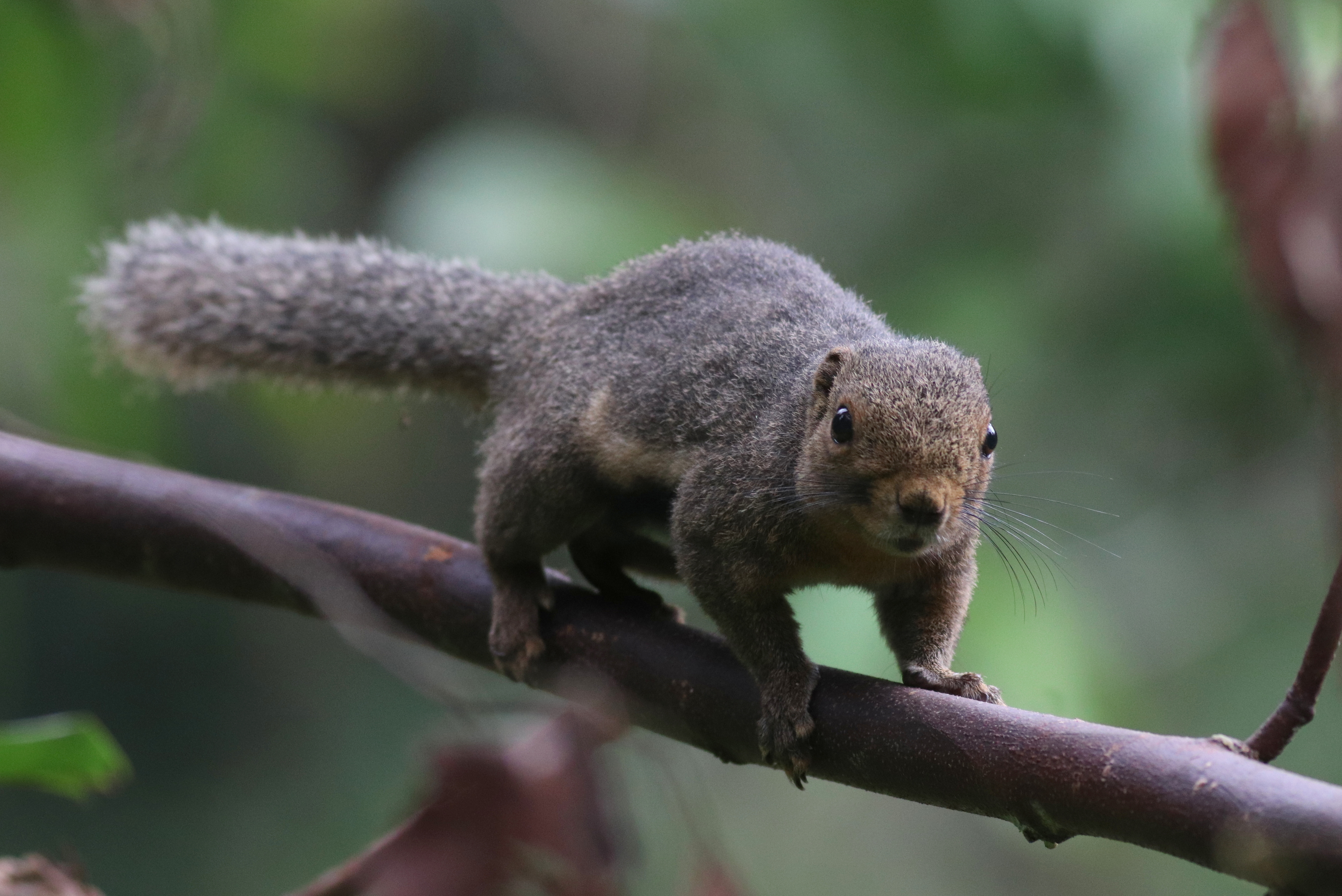

Conservation status
- Least Concern (IUCN 3.1)

Scientific classification
- Kingdom: Animalia
- Phylum: Chordata
- Class: Mammalia
- Order: Rodentia
- Family: Sciuridae
- Genus: Callosciurus
- Species: C. nigrovittatus

Binomial name
- Callosciurus nigrovittatus (Horsfield, 1824)

Subspecies
- C. n. nigrovittatus; C. n. bilimitatus; C. n. bocki; C. n. klossi
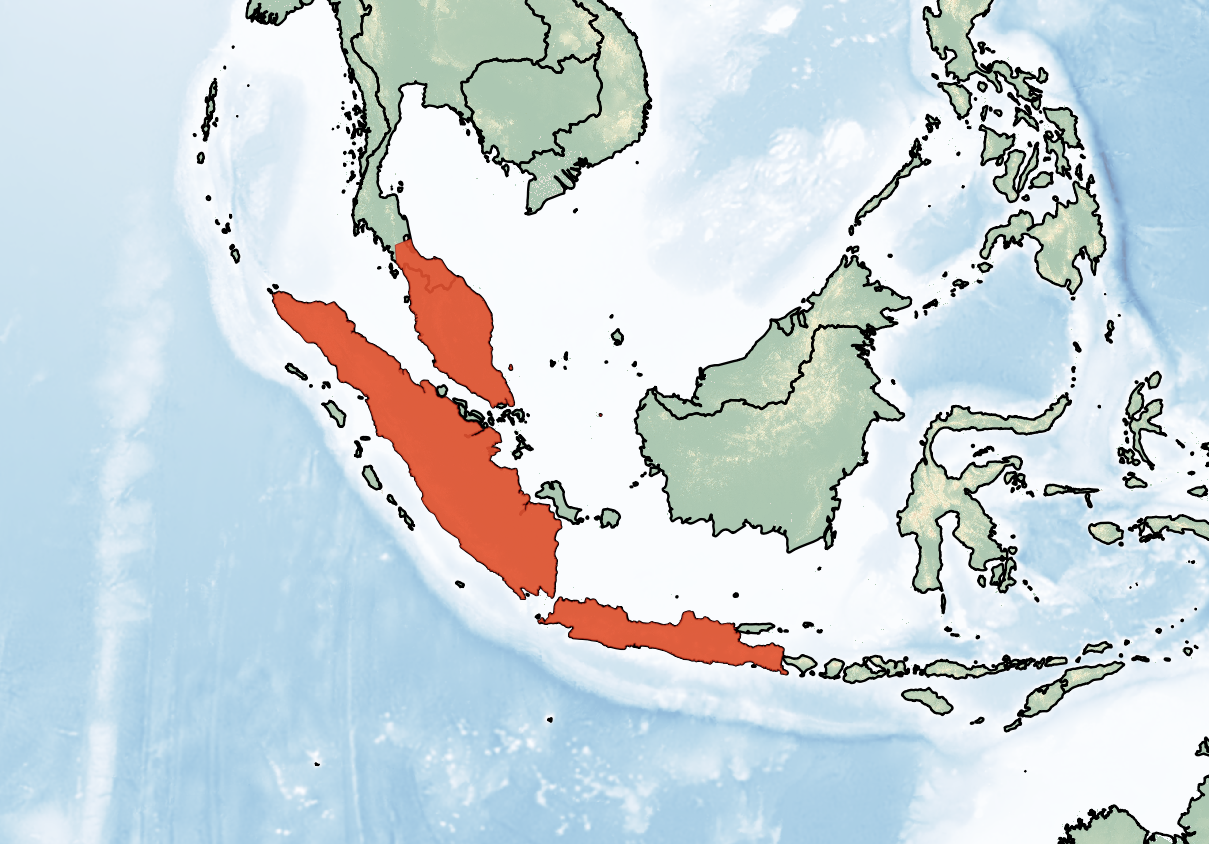

= Black-striped squirrel =

Species of "beautiful" squirrel from Southeast Asia

The black-striped squirrel (Callosciurus nigrovittatus) is a species of rodent in the family Sciuridae. It is found throughout Java, Sumatra, southern Thailand, the Malay Peninsula, and numerous small islands. This taxon consists of four subspecies: C. n. nigrovittatus, C. n. bilimitatus, C. n. bocki, and C. n. klossi. It is listed as "least concern" by the IUCN.
