= List of scandentians =

Species in mammal order Scandentia

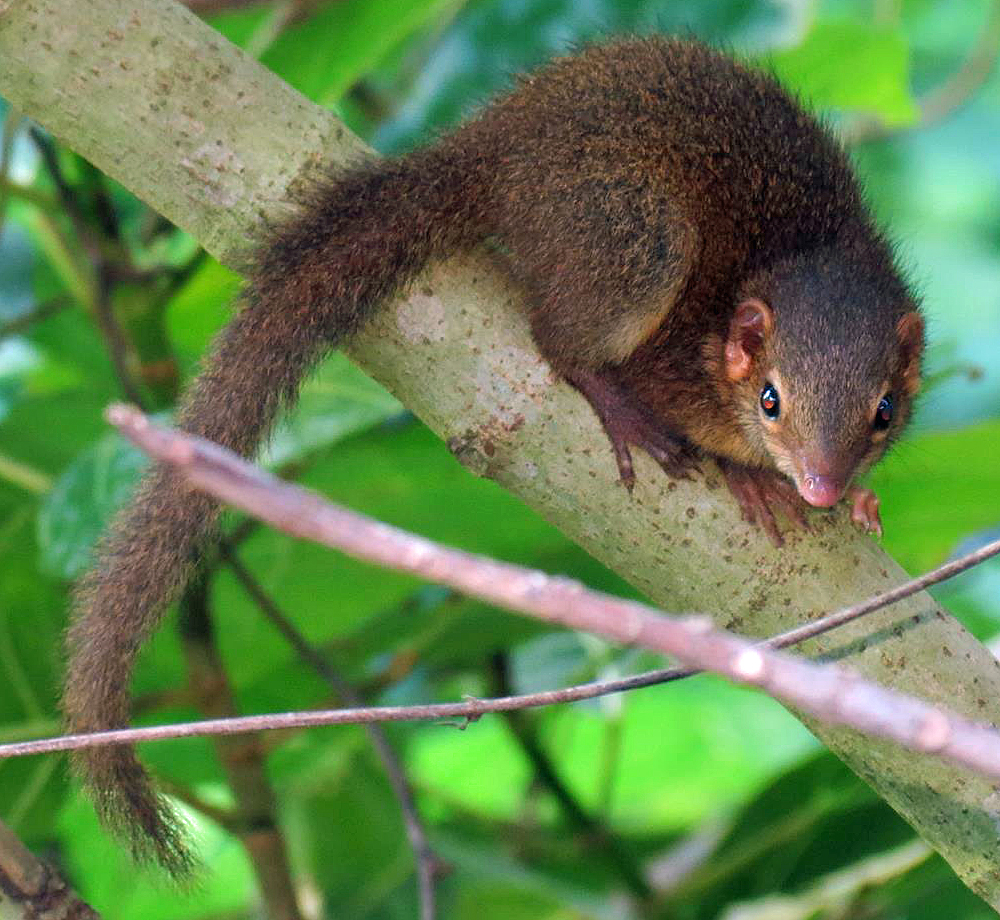
Horsfield's treeshrew (Tupaia javanica)

Scandentia is an order of small mammals. Members of this order are called scandentians, or treeshrews. They are primarily found in Southeast Asia, with the Madras treeshrew instead in mainland India. They range in size from the Bornean smooth-tailed treeshrew, at 11 cm (4 in) plus a 9 cm (4 in) tail, to the striped treeshrew, at 23 cm (9 in) plus a 13 cm (5 in) tail. They generally live in forests, and primarily eat insects and fruit. No population estimates have been made for any scandentian species, though the Nicobar treeshrew is categorized as endangered.

The twenty-three extant species of Scandentia are grouped into two families: Tupaiidae, which contains twenty-two species within three genera, and Ptilocercidae, which contains a single species, the pen-tailed treeshrew. Only a few extinct scandentian species have been discovered, though due to ongoing research and discoveries the exact number and categorization is not fixed.

== Conventions ==
IUCN Red List categories
Conservation status
- EX: Extinct (0 species)
- EW: Extinct in the wild (0 species)
- CR: Critically endangered (0 species)
- EN: Endangered (1 species)
- VU: Vulnerable (1 species)
- NT: Near threatened (0 species)
- LC: Least concern (15 species)

Other categories
- DD: Data deficient (6 species)
- NE: Not evaluated (0 species)

The author citation for the species or genus is given after the scientific name; parentheses around the author citation indicate that this was not the original taxonomic placement. Conservation status codes listed follow the International Union for Conservation of Nature (IUCN) Red List of Threatened Species. Range maps are provided wherever possible; if a range map is not available, a description of the scandentian's range is provided. Ranges are based on the IUCN Red List for that species unless otherwise noted. All extinct species or subspecies listed alongside extant species went extinct after 1500 CE, and are indicated by a dagger symbol "†".

== Classification ==
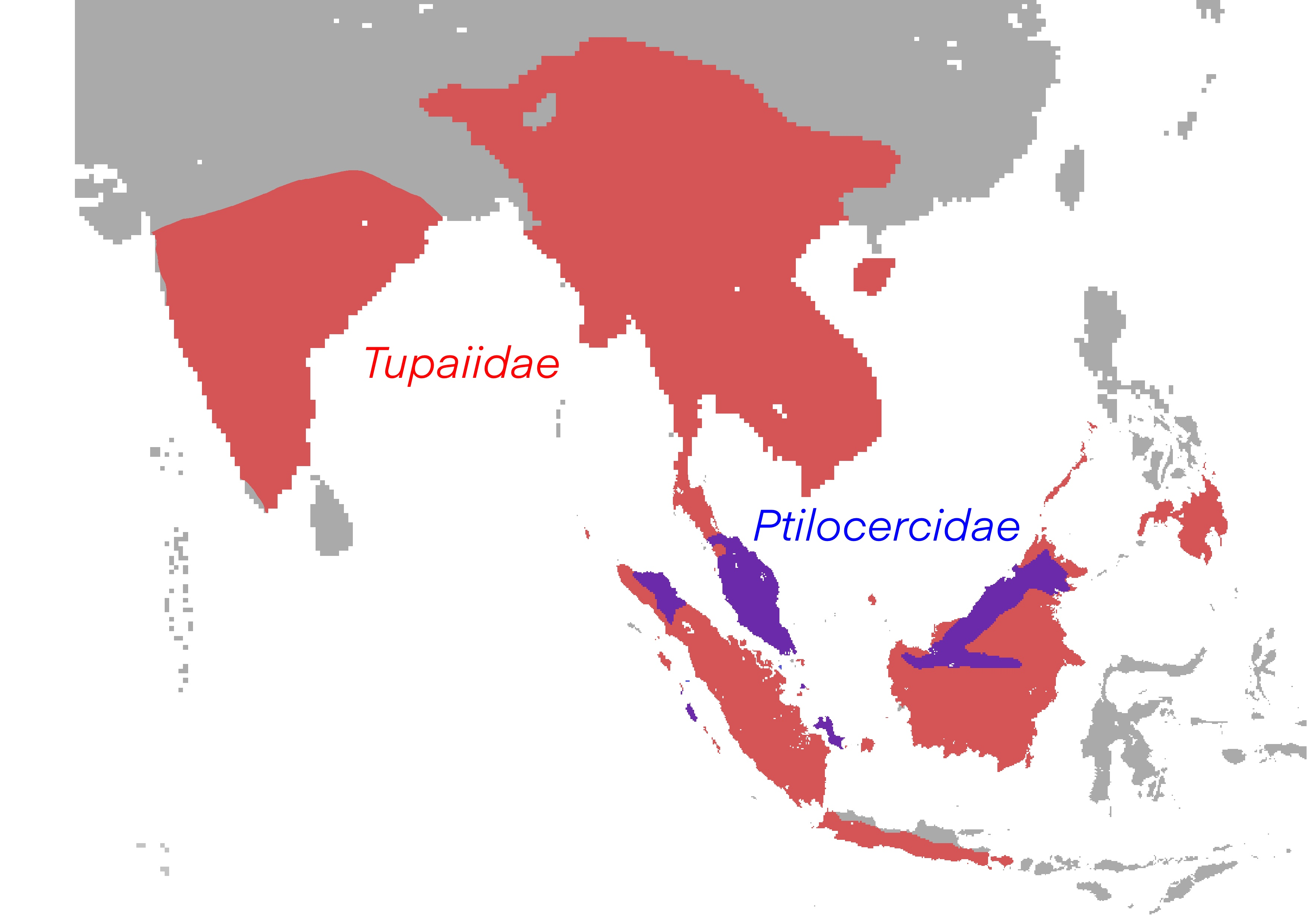
Scandentia distribution. Red: Tupaiidae, blue: Ptilocercidae, purple: both families

The order Scandentia consists of two families: Tupaiidae, which contains twenty-two species within three genera, and Ptilocercidae, which contains a single species. Many of these species are further subdivided into subspecies. This does not include hybrid species or extinct prehistoric species.

Family Ptilocercidae

- Genus Ptilocercus (pen-tailed treeshrew): one species

Family Tupaiidae

- Genus Anathana (Madras treeshrew): one species
- Genus Dendrogale (smooth-tailed treeshrews): two species
- Genus Tupaia (treeshrews): nineteen species

- Scandentia
  - Ptilocercidae
    Ptilocercus
  - Tupaiidae
    - Dendrogale
    - - Anathana
      - Tupaia

== Scandentians ==
The following classification is based on the taxonomy described by Mammal Species of the World (2005), with augmentation by generally accepted proposals made since using molecular phylogenetic analysis.

=== Family Ptilocercidae ===
Genus Ptilocercus – Gray, 1848 – one species
Common name	Scientific name and subspecies	Range	Size and ecology	IUCN status and estimated population
Pen-tailed treeshrew	P. lowii Gray, 1848 Two subspecies: P. l. continentis; P. l. lowii	Southeast Asia	Size: 13–14 cm (5–6 in) long, plus 16–19 cm (6–7 in) tail Habitat: Forest Diet: Insects and fruit	LC Unknown

=== Family Tupaiidae ===
Genus Anathana – Lyon, 1913 – one species
Common name	Scientific name and subspecies	Range	Size and ecology	IUCN status and estimated population
Madras treeshrew	A. ellioti (Waterhouse, 1850)	India	Size: 16–19 cm (6–7 in) long, plus 16–20 cm (6–8 in) tail Habitat: Forest and shrubland Diet: Insects, other invertebrates, and fruit	LC Unknown

Genus Dendrogale – Gray, 1848 – two species
Common name	Scientific name and subspecies	Range	Size and ecology	IUCN status and estimated population
Bornean smooth-tailed treeshrew	D. melanura (Thomas, 1892) Two subspecies: D. m. baluensis; D. m. melanura	Northern Borneo	Size: 11–15 cm (4–6 in) long, plus 9–14 cm (4–6 in) tail Habitat: Forest Diet: Fruit and insects	DD Unknown
Northern smooth-tailed treeshrew	D. murina (Schlegel, Müller, 1843)	Mainland Southeast Asia	Size: About 12 cm (5 in) long, plus 4–5 cm (2 in) tail Habitat: Forest Diet: Fruit, arthropods, and small vertebrates	LC Unknown

Genus Tupaia – Raffles, 1821 – nineteen species
Common name	Scientific name and subspecies	Range	Size and ecology	IUCN status and estimated population
Bangka Island treeshrew	T. discolor Lyon, 1906	Bangka Island, Indonesia	Size: 13–21 cm (5–8 in) long, plus 12–20 cm (5–8 in) tail Habitat: Unknown Diet: Fruit and insects	DD Unknown
Common treeshrew	T. glis (Diard, 1820)	Southeast Asia	Size: 13–21 cm (5–8 in) long, plus 12–20 cm (5–8 in) tail Habitat: Forest Diet: Insects, other arthropods, and fruit	LC Unknown
Golden-bellied treeshrew	T. chrysogaster Miller, 1903	Mentawai Islands, Indonesia	Size: 12–21 cm (5–8 in) long, plus 14–20 cm (6–8 in) tail Habitat: Forest Diet: Fruit and insects	VU Unknown
Horsfield's treeshrew	T. javanica Horsfield, 1822	Western Indonesia	Size: 12–21 cm (5–8 in) long, plus 14–20 cm (6–8 in) tail Habitat: Forest Diet: Fruit and insects	LC Unknown
Javan treeshrew	T. hypochrysa Thomas, 1895	Java, Indonesia	Size: 13–21 cm (5–8 in) long, plus 12–20 cm (5–8 in) tail Habitat: Unknown Diet: Fruit and insects	DD Unknown
Kalimantan treeshrew	T. salatana Lyon, 1913	Southern Borneo, Indonesia	Size: 12–21 cm (5–8 in) long, plus 14–20 cm (6–8 in) tail Habitat: Forest Diet: Termites and ants	LC Unknown
Large treeshrew	T. tana Raffles, 1821 Fifteen subspecies: T. t. banguei; T. t. besara; T. t. bunoae; T. t. cervicalis; T. t. chrysura; T. t. kelabit; T. t. kretami; T. t. lingae; T. t. masae; T. t. nitida; T. t. paitana; T. t. sirhassenensis; T. t. speciosa; T. t. tana; T. t. utara	Southeast Asia	Size: About 22 cm (9 in) long, plus 17 cm (7 in) tail Habitat: Forest Diet: Insects and other invertebrates, as well as fruit	LC Unknown
Long-footed treeshrew	T. longipes Thomas, 1893	Borneo	Size: 12–21 cm (5–8 in) long, plus 14–20 cm (6–8 in) tail Habitat: Forest Diet: Fruit and insects	LC Unknown
Mindanao treeshrew	T. everetti Thomas, 1892	Mindanao, Philippines	Size: 17–22 cm (7–9 in) long, plus 11–18 cm (4–7 in) tail Habitat: Forest Diet: Small animals, insects, fruit, vegetables, and eggs	LC Unknown
Mountain treeshrew	T. montana Thomas, 1892 Two subspecies: T. m. baluensis; T. m. montana	Northern Borneo	Size: About 20 cm (8 in) long, plus 18 cm (7 in) tail Habitat: Forest Diet: Omnivorous	LC Unknown
Nicobar treeshrew	T. nicobarica (Zelebor, 1869) Two subspecies: T. n. nicobarica; T. n. surda	Nicobar Islands, India	Size: About 14 cm (6 in) long, plus 18 cm (7 in) tail Habitat: Forest Diet: Insects as well as fruit	EN Unknown
Northern treeshrew	T. belangeri (Wagner, 1841) Two subspecies: T. b. belangeri; T. b. chinensis	Southeast Asia	Size: 12–21 cm (5–8 in) long, plus 14–20 cm (6–8 in) tail Habitat: Forest and shrubland Diet: Insects as well as fruit	LC Unknown
Painted treeshrew	T. picta Thomas, 1892 Two subspecies: T. p. fuscior; T. p. picta	Borneo	Size: About 21 cm (8 in) long, plus 15 cm (6 in) tail Habitat: Forest Diet: Fruit and insects	LC Unknown
Palawan treeshrew	T. palawanensis Thomas, 1894	Palawan, Philippines	Size: 12–21 cm (5–8 in) long, plus 14–20 cm (6–8 in) tail Habitat: Forest Diet: Insects and fruit	LC Unknown
Pygmy treeshrew	T. minor Günther, 1876 Four subspecies: T. m. humeralis; T. m. malaccana; T. m. minor; T. m. sincipis	Southeast Asia	Size: 11–14 cm (4–6 in) long, plus 13–17 cm (5–7 in) tail Habitat: Forest Diet: Small animals, fruit leaves, seeds, and carrion	LC Unknown
Ruddy treeshrew	T. splendidula Gray, 1865 Five subspecies: T. s. carimatae; T. s. lucida; T. s. natunae; T. s. riabus; T. s. splendidula	Southern Borneo	Size: About 18 cm (7 in) long, plus 14 cm (6 in) tail Habitat: Forest Diet: Fruit and insects	LC Unknown
Slender treeshrew	T. gracilis Thomas, 1893 Three subspecies: T. g. edarata; T. g. gracilis; T. g. inflata	Borneo and nearby islands	Size: 12–21 cm (5–8 in) long, plus 14–20 cm (6–8 in) tail Habitat: Forest Diet: Fruit and insects	LC Unknown
Striped treeshrew	T. dorsalis Schlegel, 1857	Borneo	Size: 14–23 cm (6–9 in) long, plus 10–13 cm (4–5 in) tail Habitat: Forest Diet: Insects, fruit, seeds, and leaves	DD Unknown
Sumatran treeshrew	T. ferruginea Raffles, 1821	Sumatra and Tanahbala, Indonesia	Size: 13–21 cm (5–8 in) long, plus 12–20 cm (5–8 in) tail Habitat: Unknown Diet: Fruit and insects	DD Unknown

== Sources ==
- Burnie, David (2017). Animal: The Definitive Visual Guide. DK. ISBN 978-1-4654-7086-7.
- Francis, Charles (2019). Field Guide to the Mammals of South-east Asia (2nd ed.). Bloomsbury Publishing. ISBN 978-1-4729-3498-7.
- Hubrecht, Robert; Kirkwood, James, eds. (2010). The UFAW Handbook on the Care and Management of Laboratory and Other Research Animals (8th ed.). John Wiley & Sons. ISBN 978-1-4051-7523-4.
- Hutchins, Michael; Kleiman, Devra G.; Geist, Valerius; McDade, Melissa C., eds. (2003). Grzimek's Animal Life Encyclopedia. Vol. 13: Mammals II (2nd ed.). Gale Research. ISBN 978-0-7876-5789-5.
- Phillipps, Quentin (2016). Phillipps' Field Guide to the Mammals of Borneo and Their Ecology. Princeton University Press. ISBN 978-0-691-16941-5.
- Stone, David; IUCN/SSC Insectivore, Tree Shrew and Elephant Shrew Specialist Group (1995). Eurasian Insectivores and Tree Shrews: Status Survey and Conservation Action Plan. International Union for Conservation of Nature. ISBN 978-2-8317-0062-5.
- Helgen, Kristofer M. (2005). Wilson, Don E.; Reeder, DeeAnn M. (eds.). Mammal Species of the World. Vol. 1 (3rd ed.). Johns Hopkins University Press. ISBN 978-0-8018-8221-0.
