= Mentawai Islands rain forests =

Terrestrial ecoregion in Indonesia

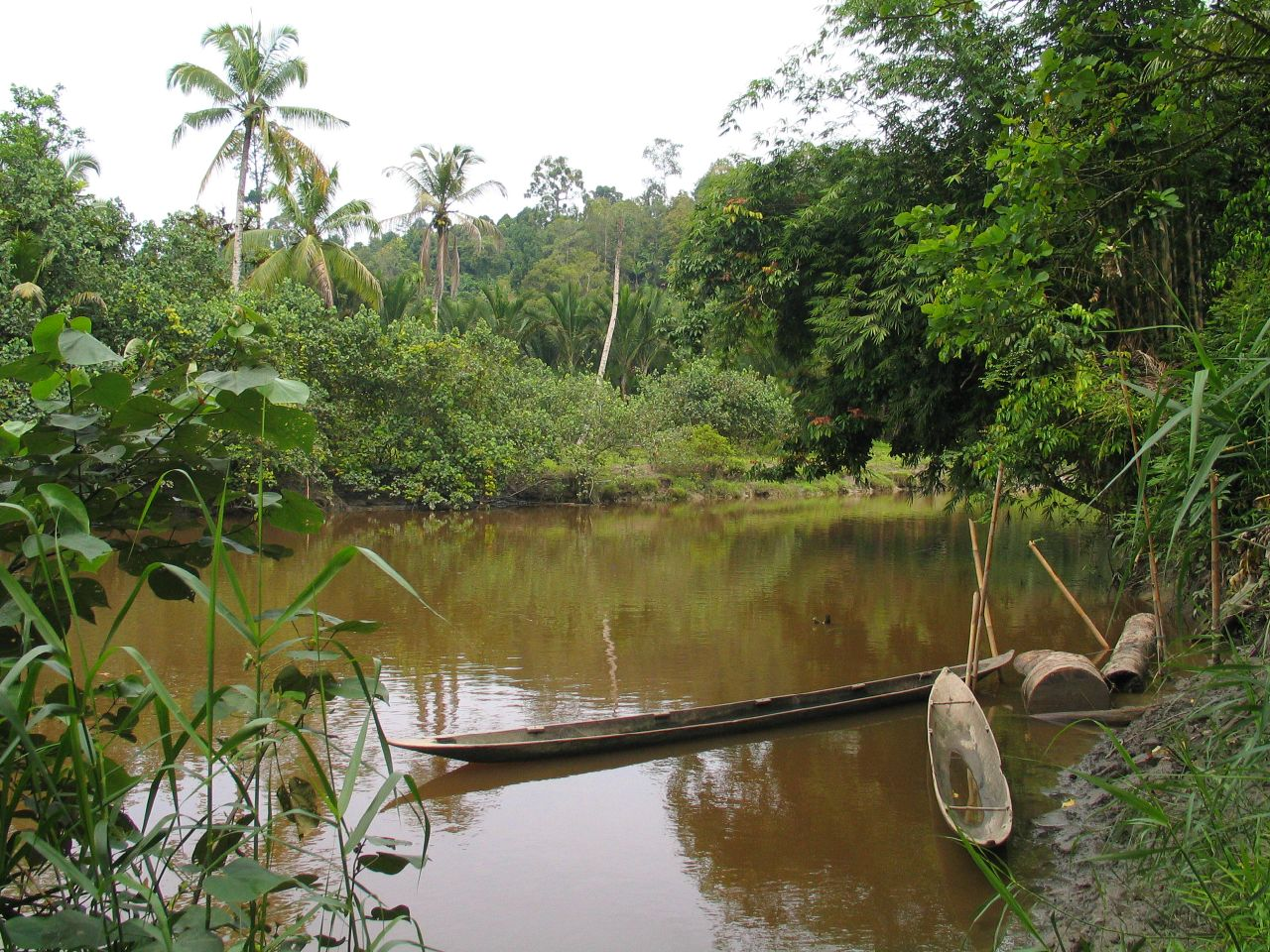
- Siberut Island

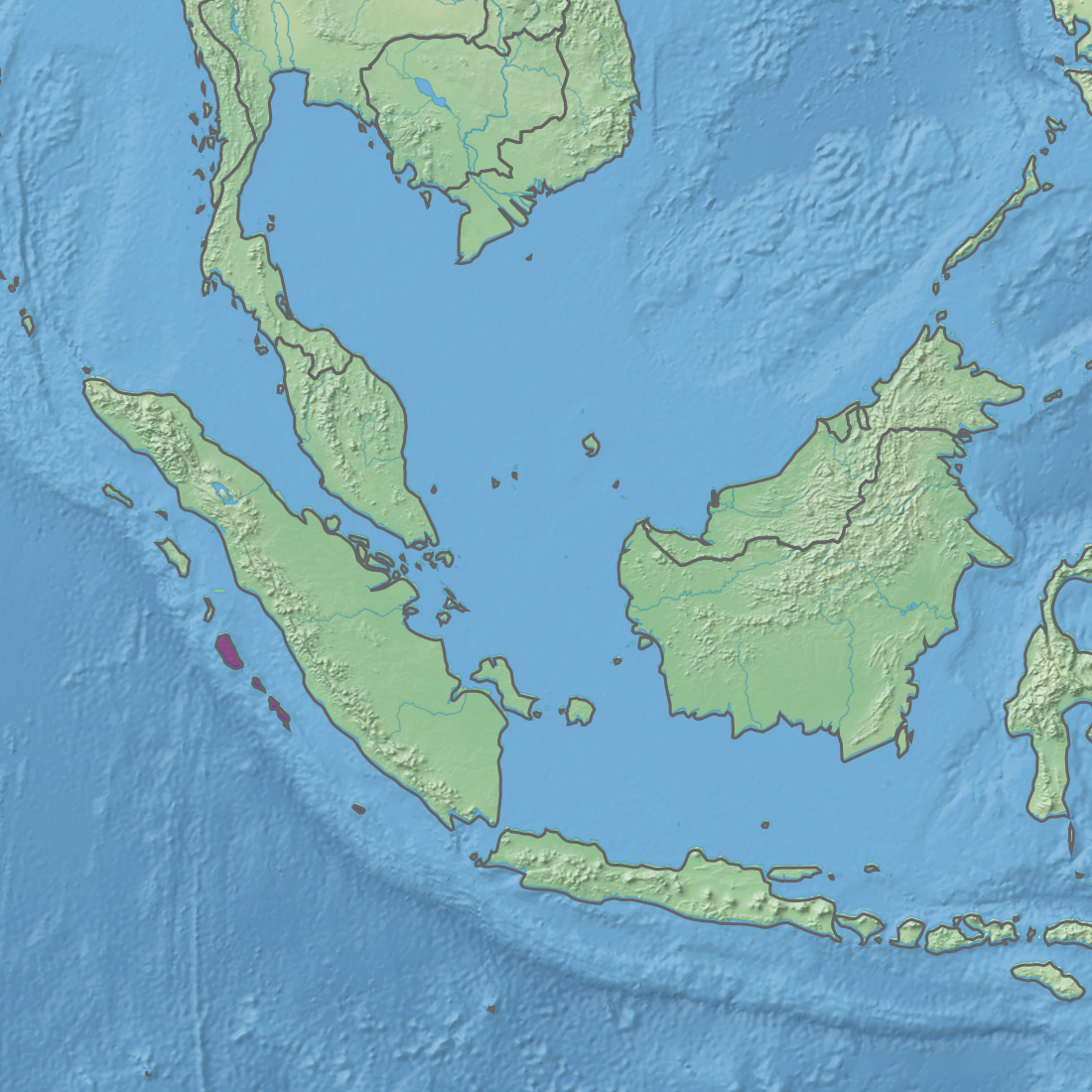
- Mentawai Islands rain forests (in purple)

Ecology
- Realm: Indomalayan
- Biome: Tropical and subtropical moist broadleaf forests

Geography
- Area: 6,513 km^{2} (2,515 sq mi)
- Country: Indonesia

Conservation
- Conservation status: Critical/endangered, nature could reach half protected
- Protected: 30.94%

The Mentawai Islands rain forests are a tropical moist broadleaf forest ecoregion in Indonesia. It covers the Mentawai Islands, an archipelago in the Indian Ocean off the west coast of Sumatra. The islands have been separated from Sumatra since the mid-Pleistocene period, and their geographic isolation allowed the evolution of several endemic species, including 17 endemic mammals.

== Geography ==
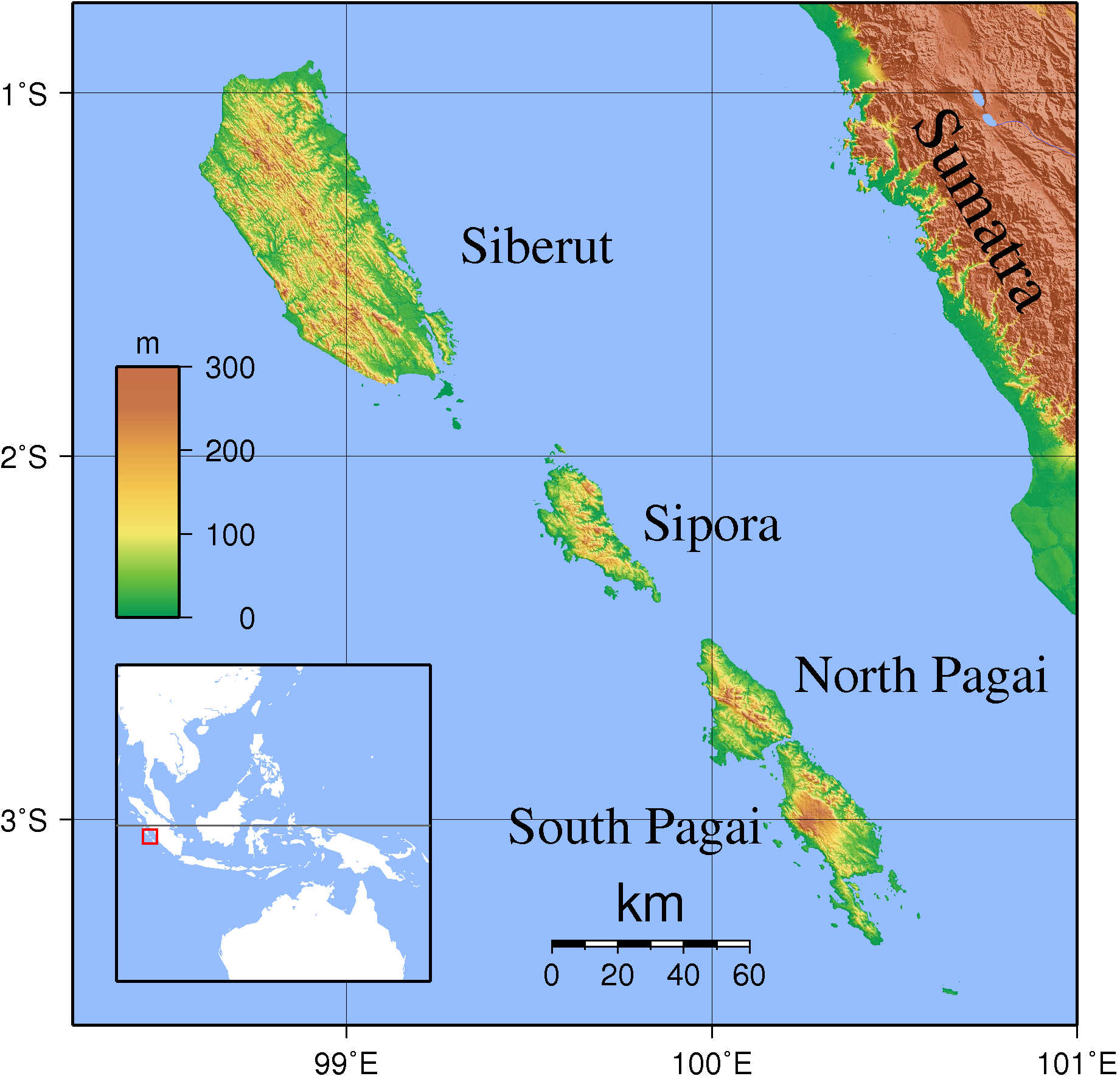
Mentawai Islands topography

The ecoregion has an area of 6,513 square kilometers, which includes all the Mentawai Islands, the largest of which are Siberut, Sipura, North Pagai, and South Pagai, as well as Enggano Island further to the southeast. The islands lie 80 to 120 km from the west coast of Sumatra.

== Climate ==
The islands have a tropical rainforest climate. Average annual rainfall is approximately 4,500 mm, with an October to March wet season. Temperatures average about 30°C year-round.

== Flora ==
The forests have a closed canopy about 36 metres high, with emergent trees rising 45 metres or more. Trees of the dipterocarp family are common canopy and emergent trees. Emergent trees include species of the dipterocarp genera Dipterocarpus and Shorea, and species of Koompassia, Sindora, and Dialium. Canopy trees include species of Mallotus, Knema, Santiria, Bhesa, Eugenia, Baccaurea, Dillenia, Artocarpus, and Horsfieldia.

== Fauna ==
There are six endemic primates in the ecoregion – Kloss's gibbon (Hylobates klossii), Mentawai macaque (Macaca pagensis), Siberut macaque (Macaca siberu), Mentawai langur (Presbytis potenziani), Siberut langur (Presbytis siberu), and pig-tailed langur (Simias concolor). Other endemic mammals include the Mentawai treeshrew (Tupaia chrysogaster), Sipora flying squirrel (Hylopetes sipora), Mentawai long-tailed giant rat (Leopoldamys siporanus), Pagai spiny rat (Maxomys pagensis), Mentawai rat (Rattus lugens), Mentawi flying squirrel (Iomys sipora), Siberut flying squirrel (Petinomys lugens), and short-headed leaf-nosed bat (Hipposideros breviceps). Other native mammals include the Asian palm civet (Paradoxurus hermaphroditus) and crab-eating macaque (Macaca fascicularis).

There are over 250 native species of birds on the islands. The Mentawai scops owl (Otus mentawi) is the only known endemic species.

== Protected areas ==
30.94% of the ecoregion is in protected areas. These include Siberut National Park, which covers the western portion of Siberut, including the islands' largest areas of intact forest in northwestern Siberut.
