= Argyrophis siamensis =

Conservation status
- Data Deficient (IUCN 3.1)

Scientific classification
- Kingdom: Animalia
- Phylum: Chordata
- Class: Reptilia
- Order: Squamata
- Suborder: Serpentes
- Family: Typhlopidae
- Genus: Argyrophis
- Species: A. siamensis

Binomial name
- Argyrophis siamensis (Günther, 1864)

Synonyms
- Typhlops siamensis Günther, 1864; Asiatyphlops siamensis (Günther, 1864)

Species of snake

Argyrophis siamensis, the Siamese blind snake or Thailand worm snake, is a species of snake in the family Typhlopidae family, the blind snakes. This snake is found in southeast Asia.

== Taxonomy ==
Argyrophis siamensis was first formally described as Typhlops siamensis in 1864 by the German-born Birtish ichthyologist and herpetologist Albert Günther with its type locality given as Siam. In 2014 T. siamenses was reclassified into the new genus Asiatyphlops, which was, however, shown to be a junior synonym of Argyrophis, a genus named by John Edward Gray in 1845 and had the same type species as Asiatyphlops, Typhlops muelleri Schlegel, 1839. This genus is classified in the subfamily Asiatylophinae within the blind snake family Tylophidae.

== Description ==
Argyrophis siamensis reaches a length of 22 cm (8.7 in) with a short tail. It has a greyish-olive to brown back and a yellowish to pale brown belly. The midbody has between 20 and 22 scale rows around it and the spece behind the nostrils is not highly concave.

== Distribution and habitat ==
Argyrophis siamensis has been recorded from Thailand, southern Vietnam and Cambodia, it has been claimed from Laos but this old record is uncertain. In Thailand this species has an uncertain type locality and was more recently found in Khao Sebab National Park, in Vietnam it has also recently been found in the Cát Tiên National Park, with just a single previous historical record. Its presence in Cambodia is based on a single historical record which does not have a precise locality and it has not been rediscovered since.

== Conservation status ==
Argyrophis siamensis has been assessed as Data Deficient by the IUCN because almost nothing is known about its distribution, with most of the few records being historical, and it is very similar to A. muelleri. The areas it has been found have been affected by logging and forest clearance for agriculture.
