= Millet's leopoldamys =

Conservation status
- Least Concern (IUCN 3.1)]

Scientific classification
- Kingdom: Animalia
- Phylum: Chordata
- Class: Mammalia
- Order: Rodentia
- Family: Muridae
- Genus: Leopoldamys
- Species: L. milleti

Binomial name
- Leopoldamys milleti Robinson & Kloss, 1922

Species of rodent

Millet's leopoldamys (Leopoldamys milleti) is a species of rodent from the family Muridae. It lives in the Langbian highlands of southern Vietnam, although its distribution limits are currently unresolved. It is listed as Least Concern on the IUCN Red List, and though only a handful of museum specimens signify its existence, it is presumed to have a high, stable population. There are no apparent major threats to the species, and it occurs in a number of protected Vietnamese areas. Millet's leopoldamys is a large, terrestrial omnivore that prefers montane forest, but is tolerant of secondary forest.

Millet's leopoldamys was originally recognized in 1922 by Herbert Christopher Robinson and Cecil Boden Kloss as a "remarkably distinct race" of Edwards's long-tailed giant rat. It remained described as such, while the Edwards's long-tailed giant rat went back and forth between the genera Rattus and Leopoldamys. However, Millet's leopoldamys is distinct from Edwards's long-tailed giant rat by its much darker dorsal pelage and larger bullae. Robinson and Kloss later noted that Millet's leopoldamys had a similar appearance to Bower's white-toothed rat, and a more recent specimen was initially identified as such.

== See also ==
- Edwards's long-tailed giant rat
- Bower's white-toothed rat
