= Sundaic mountain leopoldamys =

Conservation status
- Least Concern (IUCN 3.1)

Scientific classification
- Kingdom: Animalia
- Phylum: Chordata
- Class: Mammalia
- Order: Rodentia
- Family: Muridae
- Genus: Leopoldamys
- Species: L. ciliatus

Binomial name
- Leopoldamys ciliatus (Bonhote, 1900)

Synonyms
- L. setiger (Robinson and Kloss, 1916)

Species of rodent

The Sundaic mountain leopoldamys (Leopoldamys ciliatus) is a species of rodent from the family Muridae. It was formerly considered a subspecies of Edwards's long-tailed giant rat, and it has one synonym: Leopoldamys setiger.

The Sundaic mountain leopoldamys occurs in the montane forests of Sumatra, Indonesia, and peninsular Malaysia, typically at elevations above 1 km (0.62 mi). It is a terrestrial, possibly arboreal species occurring in primary and degraded tropical moist forest.

The Sundaic mountain leopoldamys is listed as Least Concern by the IUCN Red List due to a wide distribution, presumed large population, occurrence in a number of protected areas, degree of tolerance for habitat modification, and unlikely declination at the speed to qualify for a more threatened listing. However, due to deforestation of its habitat for timber, firewood, and agricultural land, its population is decreasing.
