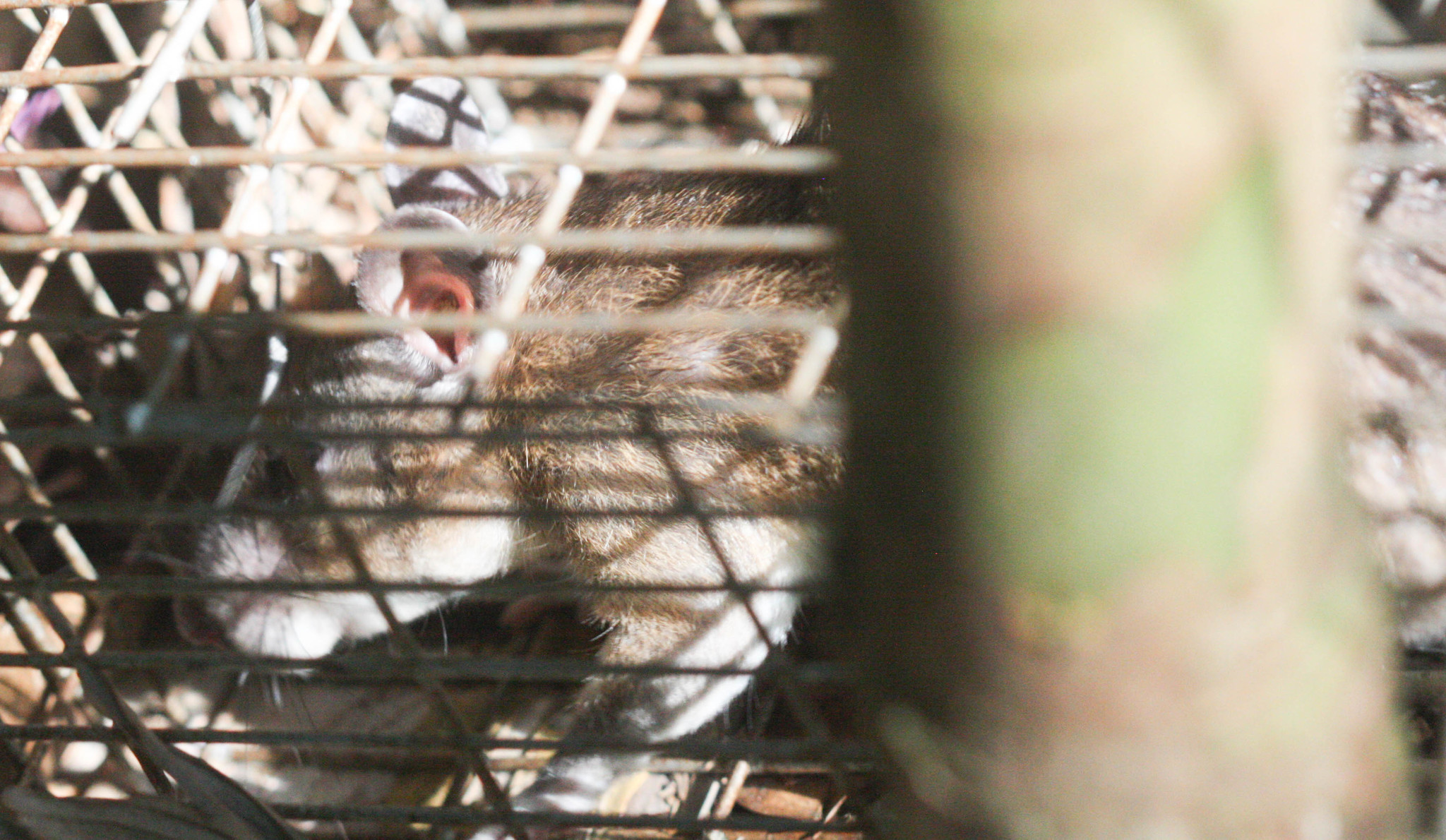
- Leopoldamys sabanus

Scientific classification
- Domain: Eukaryota
- Kingdom: Animalia
- Phylum: Chordata
- Class: Mammalia
- Order: Rodentia
- Family: Muridae
- Tribe: Rattini
- Genus: Leopoldamys; Ellerman, 1947

Type species
- Mus sabanus

Species
- Leopoldamys ciliatus Leopoldamys edwardsi Leopoldamys milleti Leopoldamys neilli Leopoldamys sabanus Leopoldamys siporanus

= Leopoldamys =

Leopoldamys Temporal range: Late Pliocene to Recent

Genus of rodents

Leopoldamys is a genus of rodents in the family Muridae endemic to Southeast Asia. It contains the following species:

- Sundaic mountain long-tailed giant rat (Leopoldamys ciliatus)
- Diwangkara's long-tailed giant rat (Leopoldamys diwangkarai)
- Edwards's long-tailed giant rat (Leopoldamys edwardsi)
- Millet's long-tailed giant rat (Leopoldamys milleti)
- Neill's long-tailed giant rat (Leopoldamys neilli)
- Long-tailed giant rat (Leopoldamys sabanus)
- Mentawai long-tailed giant rat (Leopoldamys siporanus)
