= Argyrophis trangensis =

Conservation status
- Data Deficient (IUCN 3.1)

Scientific classification
- Kingdom: Animalia
- Phylum: Chordata
- Class: Reptilia
- Order: Squamata
- Suborder: Serpentes
- Family: Typhlopidae
- Genus: Argyrophis
- Species: A. trangensis

Binomial name
- Argyrophis trangensis (Taylor, 1962)

Synonyms
- Typhlops trangensis; Asiatyphlops trangensis

Species of snake

Argyrophis trangensis, also known as the Trang blind snake or Trang worm snake, is a species of snake in the Typhlopidae family.
