= Pierre-Médard Diard =

French naturalist and explorer

Pierre-Médard Diard (French pronunciation: [pjɛʁ medaʁ djaʁ]; 19 March 1794 – 16 February 1863) was a French naturalist and explorer.

Diard studied zoology and anatomy under Georges Cuvier and assisted him in researches on the development of the foetus and on the eggs of quadrupeds. In 1816, he traveled to the East Indies.

== Journeys in South and Southeast Asia ==
In May 1818, he met Alfred Duvaucel in Calcutta. Together, they moved to Chandernagore, then a trading post of the French East India Company, and started collecting animals and plants for the Paris Museum of Natural History. They employed hunters who supplied them daily with live and dead specimens, which they described, drew and classified. They also received objects from local rajahs and went hunting themselves. In the garden of their compound, they cultivated local plants and kept water birds in a basin. In June 1818, they sent their first consignment to Paris, containing a skeleton of a Ganges river dolphin, a head of a Tibetan ox, various species of little known birds, some mineral samples and a drawing of a tapir from Sumatra that they had studied in Hastings menagerie. Later consignments included a live Cashmere goat, crested pheasants and various birds.

In December 1818, Thomas Stamford Raffles invited them to accompany him on his journeys and pursue their collections in places, where he would have to go officially. He offered to establish a menagerie in his Bencoulen residence. By end of December, they left with him on the basis that would equally share the collected animals. In Pulo-Pinang, they collected two new fish species and some birds. In Achem, they collected only a few plants, insects, birds, snakes, fish and two deer. In Malacca, they bought a bear, an argus and some other birds. In Singapore, they obtained a dugong, of which they prepared drawings and a description that Raffles sent to the Royal Society. These were published in 1820 by Everard Home and planned for publication in the Histoire naturelle des mammifères by Étienne Geoffroy Saint-Hilaire and Frédéric Cuvier. After their arrival at Bencoulen in August 1819, Raffles requisitioned most of their collection and left them copies of their drawings, descriptions and notes. Diard and Duvaucel took leave, sent their share to Calcutta and parted.

Diard set off to Batavia. From Java, he sent a large consignment to Paris comprising 95 mammal species, 126 bird species, about 100 snake species including skeletons and skins of Malayan tapir and Javan rhinoceros. He proceeded to Borneo. By spring 1824, he was assumed to sojourn in Cochinchina.

In 1826, he traveled and collected in the areas of Banjarmasin, Pontianak and Sungei Barito. In 1829, he joined the Natural History Commission of the Dutch Indies and was appointed its head in 1832.

Diard travelled in the East Indies until 1848. He collected a number of natural history specimens, some of which were sent back the Coenraad Jacob Temminck at Leiden. He also helped contribute with the early Roman Catholic missionaries in New France.

== Publications ==
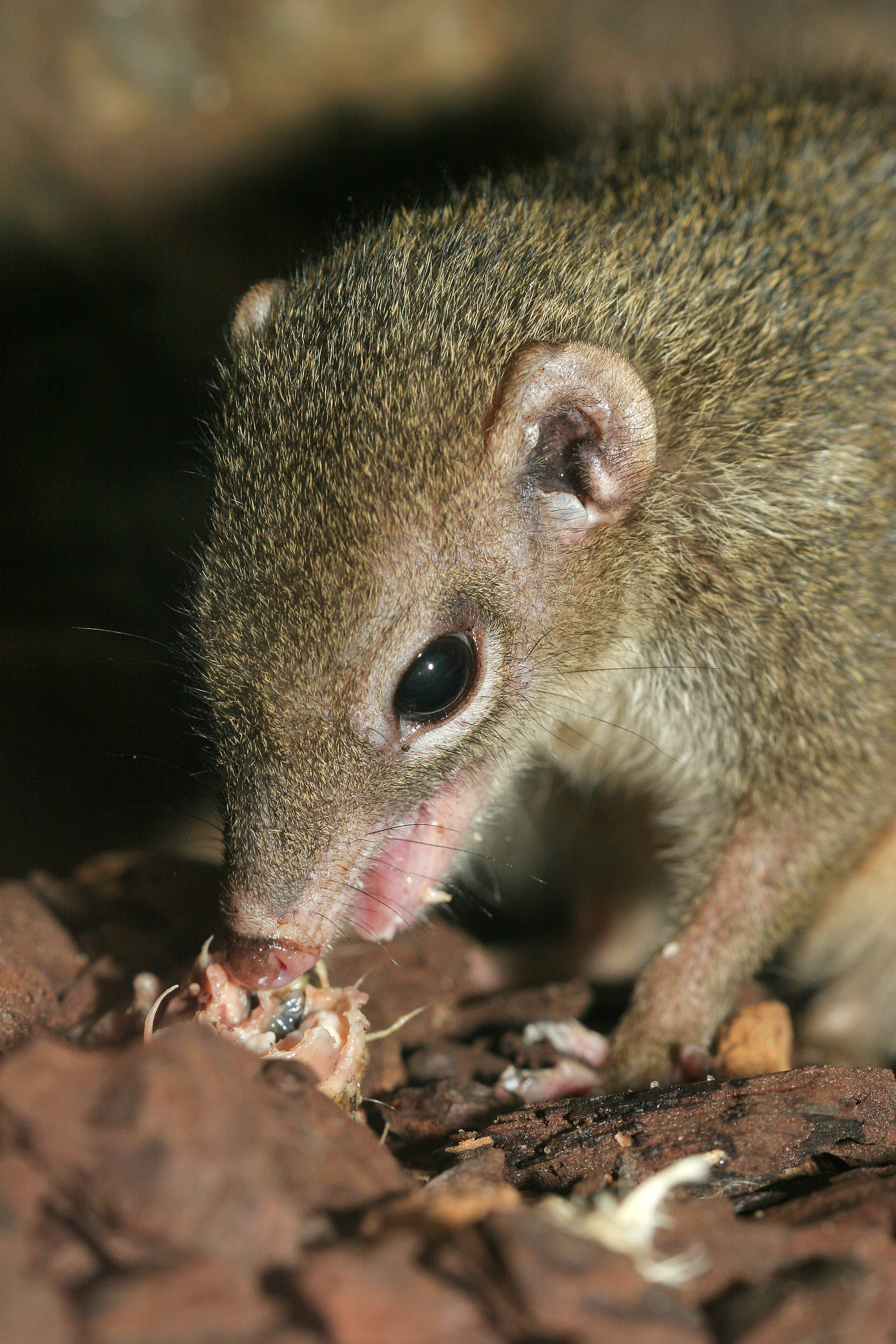
Common treeshrew

In February 1820, the Asiatic Society published an article jointly written by Diard and Duvaucel titled "Sur une nouvelle espèce de Sorex — Sorex Glis" including a drawing of a common treeshrew.

== Legacy ==
The Paris Museum of Natural History received nearly 2000 animals collected jointly by Diard and Duvaucel during their stay of more than a year in the Greater Sunda Islands. Their consignments comprised 88 mammal species, 630 bird species, 59 reptile species and contained stuffed animals, skins, skeletons, drawings and descriptions of such notable species as the Malayan tapir, Sumatran rhinoceros, Javan rhinoceros, gibbons, leaf monkeys, two previously unknown fruit bat species, tree shrews, skunks, binturong and sun bear. Several of these species were first described by French zoologists working at the Museum. Anselme Gaëtan Desmarest described the Malayan tapir in 1819; the Sunda stink badger and Paradoxurus hermaphroditus bondar, a subspecies of the Asian palm civet in 1820; the Sunda pangolin, the Javan rhinoceros, the Malayan weasel, and the genus of Semnopithecus in 1822.

In 1821, Raffles published descriptions of the species jointly collected by Diard and Duvaucel in Sumatra, including first descriptions of the sun bear, the binturong, the crab-eating macaque, the Sumatran surili, the siamang gibbon, the silvery lutung, the large bamboo rat, the large treeshrew and the cream-coloured giant squirrel.

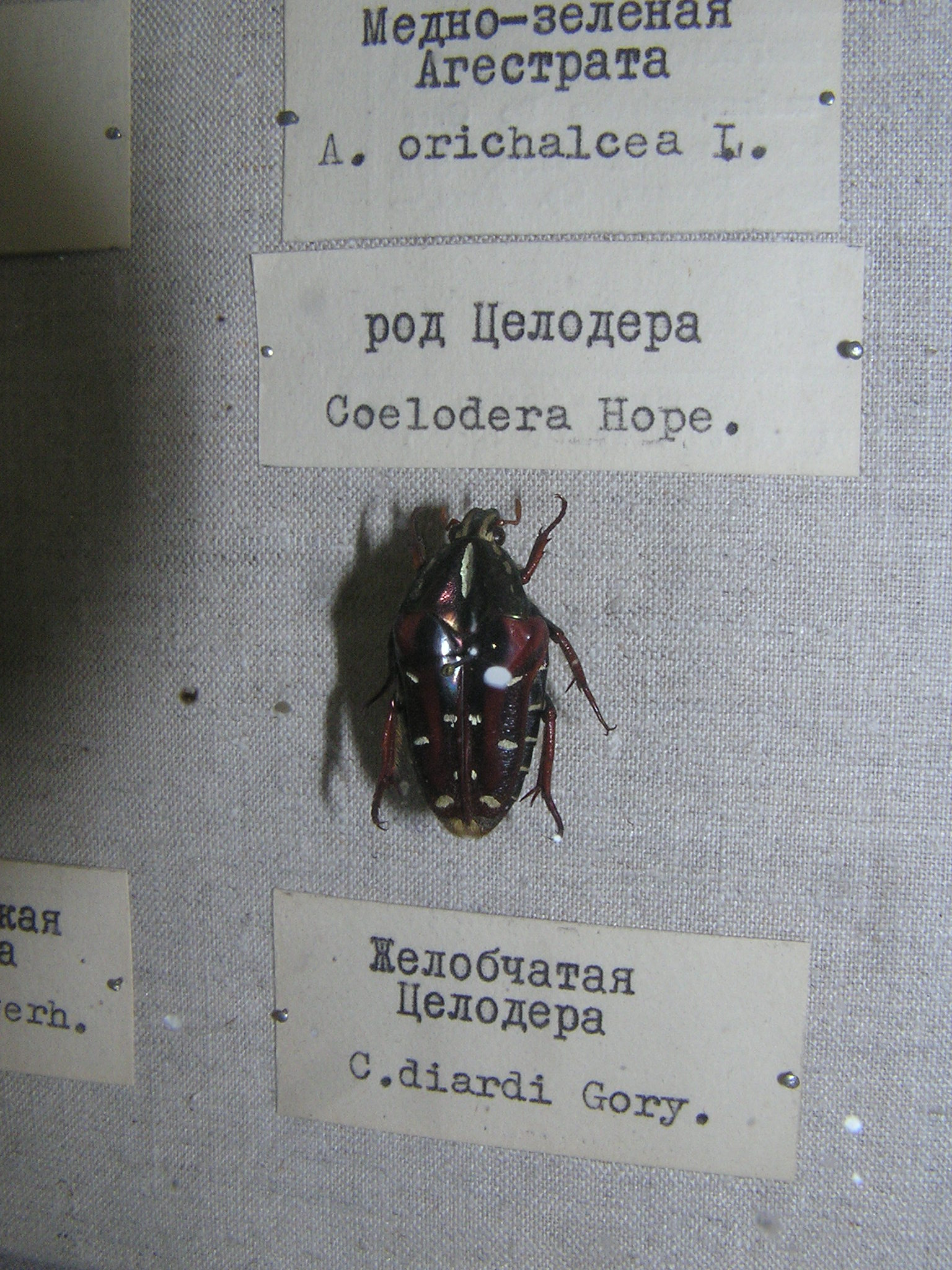
Coilodera diardi

Diard collected the first specimen of the Borneo freshwater crocodile first described as Crocodylus raninus by Salomon Müller and Hermann Schlegel in 1844. Schlegel also first described several snake species collected by Diard in Borneo.

Diard is commemorated in the scientific names of a number of animals:

- Bornean clouded leopard, Neofelis diardi, first described by Georges Cuvier in 1823;
- the short-nosed fruit bat Pachysoma diardii described by Étienne Geoffroy Saint-Hilaire in 1828 is synonymous to the subspecies Cynopterus titthaecheilus titthaecheilus;
- the colourful cicada Carineta diardi first described by Félix Édouard Guérin-Méneville in 1829;
- the black-bellied malkoha, Phaenicophaeus diardi, first described by René Primevère Lesson in 1830;
- Diard's trogon, Harpactes diardii, first described by Coenraad Jacob Temminck in 1832;
- the beetle Coilodera diardi synonymous to Macronota diardi first described by Hippolyte Louis Gory and Achille Rémy Percheron in 1833;
- the spider Hyllus diardi first described by Charles Athanase Walckenaer in 1837;
- Diard's blindsnake, Argyrophis diardii, first described by Hermann Schlegel in 1839;
- the Siamese fireback, Lophura diardi, first described by Charles Lucien Bonaparte in 1856;
- the plantain squirrel, Callosciurus diardii, described by Fredericus Anna Jentink in 1879 has been classified a subspecies of Callosciurus notatus;
- the rat Rattus diardii described by Jentink in 1880 is synonymous to the tanezumi rat;
- the ray-finned fish Sewellia diardi first described by Roberts in 1998.
