= Palawan treeshrew =

Conservation status
- Least Concern (IUCN 3.1)
- CITES Appendix II (CITES)

Scientific classification
- Kingdom: Animalia
- Phylum: Chordata
- Class: Mammalia
- Order: Scandentia
- Family: Tupaiidae
- Genus: Tupaia
- Species: T. palawanensis

Binomial name
- Tupaia palawanensis Thomas, 1894
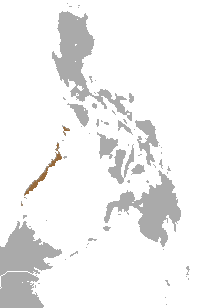
- Palawan treeshrew range

Synonyms
- Tupaia moellendorffi Matschie, 1898

Species of mammal

The Palawan treeshrew (Tupaia palawanensis) is a treeshrew species endemic to the Palawan Island, Philippines, where it occurs from sea level to an elevation of 1,400 m (4,600 ft). The population is considered steady. Formerly, it was considered a subspecies of the common treeshrew. Those found on the islands of Busuanga and Culion, which are part of the Calamian Islands group in the Philippines, have also been called the Calamian treeshrew.

== Habitat and ecology ==
This species occurs in jungles rich with fresh water and rivers. It also can be found in agriculture or farming zones, for example, cashew and coconut farms, brushy regions, and logged-over areas. No threats to this species are known.

== Taxonomy ==
The German zoologist Paul Matschie first described a Calamian treeshrew from Culion that was part of a zoological collection obtained by the Berlin Zoological Museum in the present day the Natural History Museum, Berlin. He considered it a distinct species as this type specimen differed from the Palawan treeshrew by a slightly shorter muzzle, and a lighter colour of the toes, hair of the tail and chest. It is now recognised as a synonym of the Palawan treeshrew.
