= Koshun worm snake =

Conservation status
- Data Deficient (IUCN 3.1)

Scientific classification
- Kingdom: Animalia
- Phylum: Chordata
- Class: Reptilia
- Order: Squamata
- Suborder: Serpentes
- Family: Typhlopidae
- Genus: Argyrophis
- Species: A. koshunensis

Binomial name
- Argyrophis koshunensis (Oshima, 1916)

Synonyms
- Typhlops koshunensis; Asiatyphlops koshunensis

Species of snake

The Koshun worm snake (Argyrophis koshunensis) is a species of snake in the family Typhlopidae. It is endemic to Taiwan. Very little is known about this species known only from a small number of historical records; it is considered Data Deficient by IUCN.
