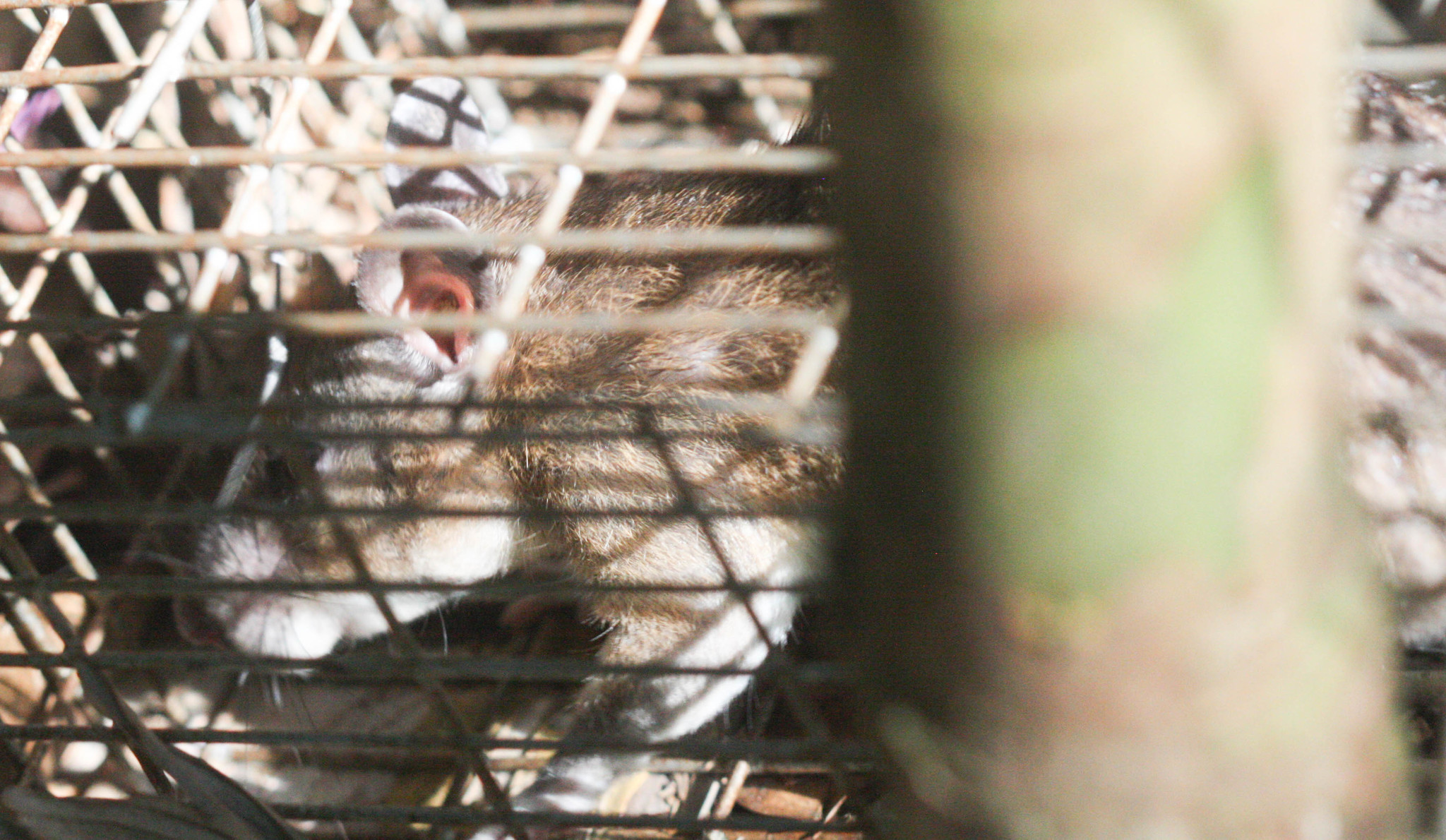

Conservation status
- Least Concern (IUCN 3.1)

Scientific classification
- Kingdom: Animalia
- Phylum: Chordata
- Class: Mammalia
- Order: Rodentia
- Family: Muridae
- Genus: Leopoldamys
- Species: L. sabanus

Binomial name
- Leopoldamys sabanus (Thomas, 1887)
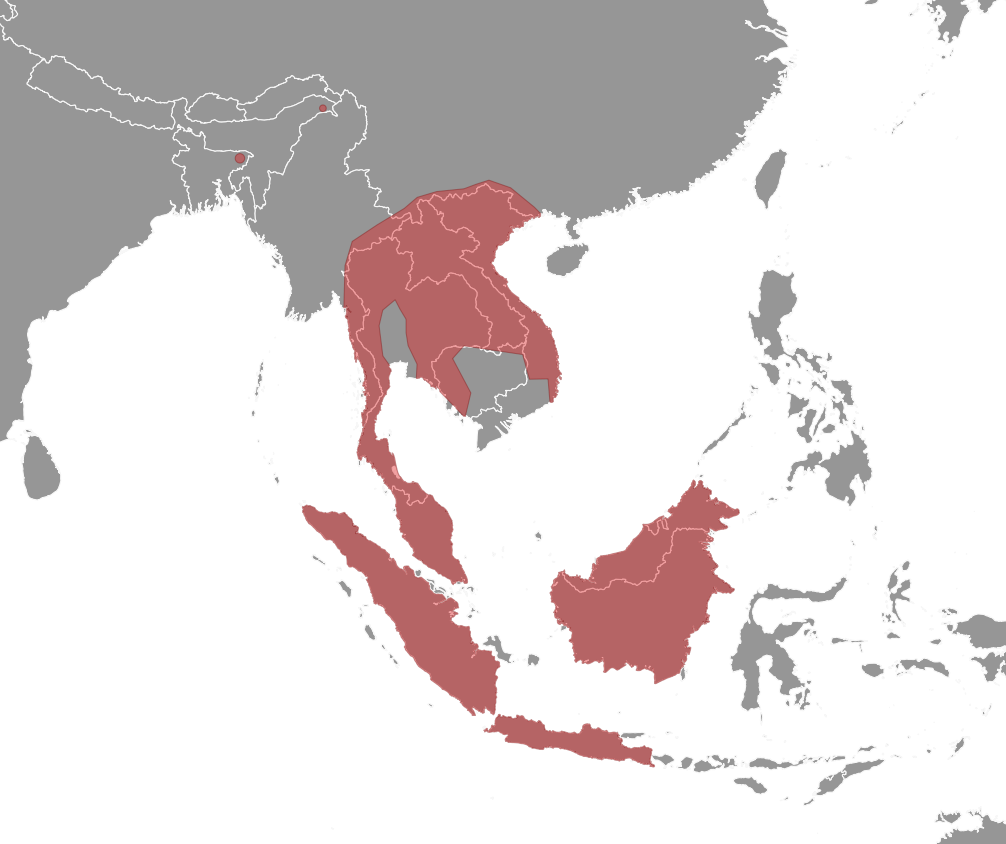

= Long-tailed giant rat =

Species of rodent

The long-tailed giant rat (Leopoldamys sabanus) is a species of rodent in the family Muridae. It is found in Bangladesh, Cambodia, Indonesia, Laos, Malaysia, Thailand, and Vietnam.
