= Günther's blind snake =

Conservation status
- Data Deficient (IUCN 3.1)

Scientific classification
- Kingdom: Animalia
- Phylum: Chordata
- Class: Reptilia
- Order: Squamata
- Suborder: Serpentes
- Family: Typhlopidae
- Genus: Argyrophis
- Species: A. bothriorhynchus

Binomial name
- Argyrophis bothriorhynchus (Günther, 1864)

Synonyms
- Typhlops bothriorhynchus; Asiatyphlops bothriorhynchus

Species of snake

Günther's blind snake (Argyrophis bothriorhynchus) is a species of snake in the Typhlopidae family.
