= Sumatra worm snake =

Conservation status
- Data Deficient (IUCN 3.1)

Scientific classification
- Kingdom: Animalia
- Phylum: Chordata
- Class: Reptilia
- Order: Squamata
- Suborder: Serpentes
- Family: Typhlopidae
- Genus: Argyrophis
- Species: A. hypsobothrius

Binomial name
- Argyrophis hypsobothrius (Werner, 1917)

Synonyms
- Typhlops hypsobothrius; Indotyphlops hypsobothriuss

Species of snake

The Sumatra worm snake (Argyrophis hypsobothrius) is a species of snake in the Typhlopidae family.
