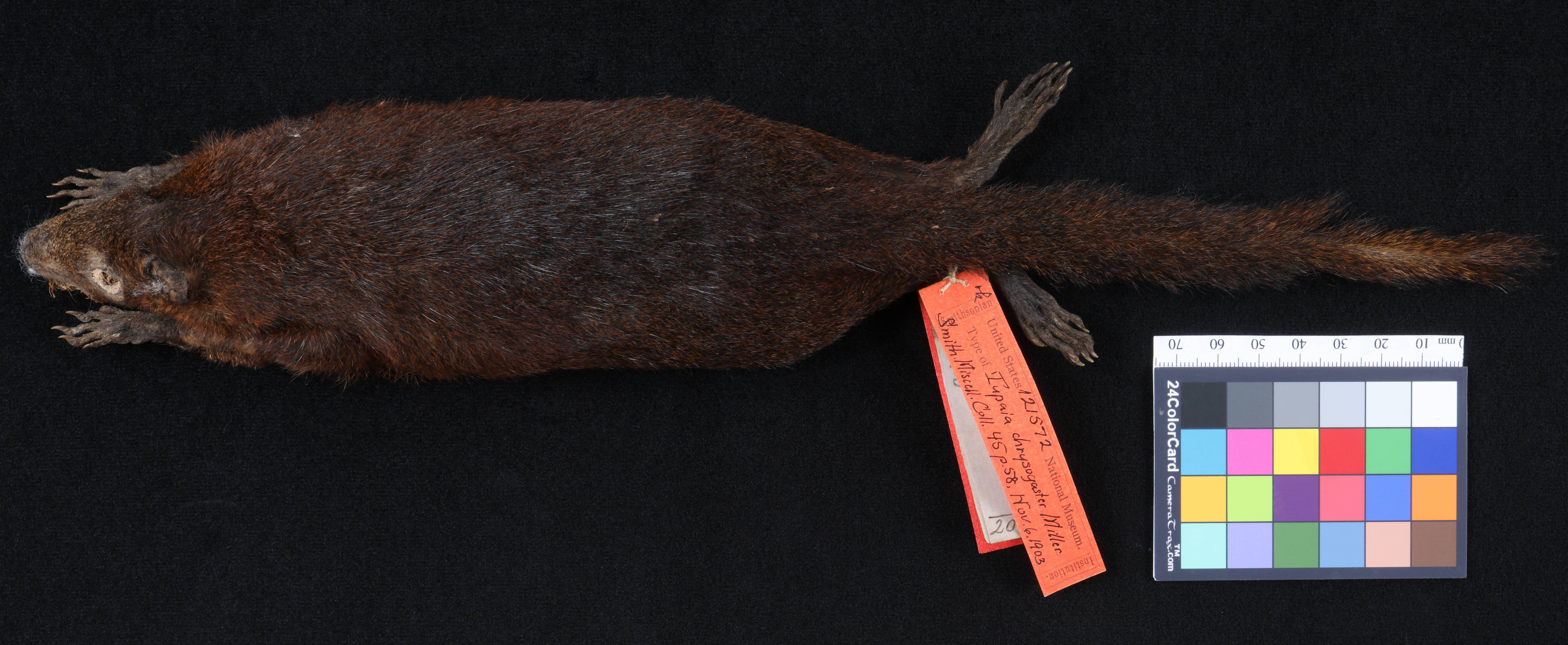
- A specimen of Tupaia chrysogaster

Conservation status
- Vulnerable (IUCN 3.1)
- CITES Appendix II

Scientific classification
- Kingdom: Animalia
- Phylum: Chordata
- Class: Mammalia
- Order: Scandentia
- Family: Tupaiidae
- Genus: Tupaia
- Species: T. chrysogaster

Binomial name
- Tupaia chrysogaster Miller, 1903
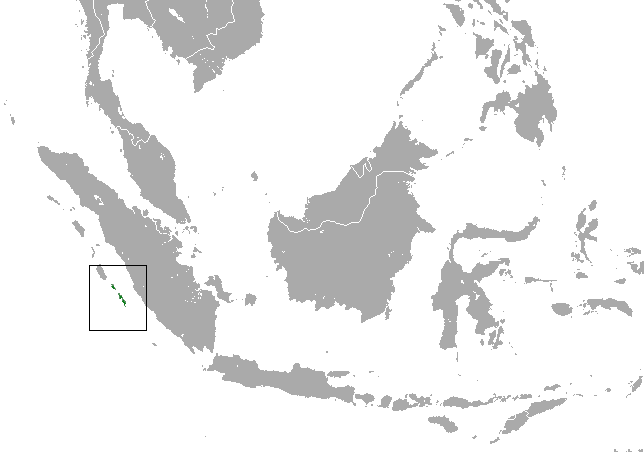
- Golden-bellied treeshrew range

= Golden-bellied treeshrew =

Species of mammal

The golden-bellied treeshrew (Tupaia chrysogaster) is a treeshrew species within the Tupaiidae. It is also called Mentawai treeshrew as it is endemic to the Indonesian Mentawai islands of Sipora, North and South Pagai. It lives in forests, and is considered endangered due to habitat loss since the islands' forests are continuously logged.

The American zoologist Gerrit Smith Miller Jr. first described a golden-bellied treeshrew from North Pagai Island that was part of a zoological collection obtained by the United States National Museum. He considered it a distinct species as this type specimen differed from the common treeshrew by larger teeth and skull, darker coloured fur on the back and a more coarsely grizzled tail.

The golden-bellied treeshrew has a restricted distribution that is limited to the Mentawai Islands of Western Indonesia. Due to the islands small geographic range and the continuous decline in the quality of the forest habitat, IUCN classifies this species as endangered.

Habitat fragmentation, which is caused by logging and expansion of local agriculture,continuously threatens the habitat of golden-bellied treeshrews. Although this species can also be found in a few smaller protected areas, the degradation of the habitat for this species remains a concern for their long-term survival.
