= Argyrophis oatesii =

Conservation status
- Data Deficient (IUCN 3.1)

Scientific classification
- Kingdom: Animalia
- Phylum: Chordata
- Class: Reptilia
- Order: Squamata
- Suborder: Serpentes
- Family: Typhlopidae
- Genus: Argyrophis
- Species: A. oatesii

Binomial name
- Argyrophis oatesii Boulenger, 1890

Synonyms
- Typhlops oatesii Boulenger, 1890; Typhlops oatesii — Boulenger, 1893; Typhlops oatesi — Wall, 1923; Asiatyphlops oatesii — Hedges et al., 2014; Argyrophis oatesii — Pyron & Wallach, 2014

Species of snake

Argyrophis oatesii, also known as the Andaman Island worm snake or Oates's blind snake, is a species of harmless snake in the family Typhlopidae. The species is endemic to the Andaman Islands. There are no subspecies accepted as being valid.

== Etymology ==
The specific name, oatesii, is in honour of English ornithologist Eugene William Oates.

== Geographic range ==
Until recently, A. oatesii was only known from the type locality, which is "Table Island, Cocos Group, Andamans" in the Bay of Bengal. Table Island belongs to Myanmar. However, Murthy and Chakrapany (1983), reported finding a second specimen from the island of Mayabunder, just off the coast of Middle Andaman Island, which belongs to India.

== Description ==
Boulenger (1893) described A. oatesii as follows: "24 scales round the body. Yellowish, with confluent brown spots corresponding to the series of scales and forming longitudinal lines which are broader than the interspaces. Total length [including tail] 200 millim. [7.9 inches]."

== Reproduction ==
Argyrophis oatesii is oviparous.
