= Diwangkara's long-tailed giant rat =

Conservation status
- Data Deficient (IUCN 3.1)

Scientific classification
- Kingdom: Animalia
- Phylum: Chordata
- Class: Mammalia
- Order: Rodentia
- Family: Muridae
- Genus: Leopoldamys
- Species: L. diwangkarai

Binomial name
- Leopoldamys diwangkarai Maryanto & Sinaga, 2008

Species of rodent

The Diwangkara's long-tailed giant rat (Leopoldamys diwangkarai) is a species of rodent in the family Muridae. It is found in the Indonesian regions of Kalimantan and Java.
