= Argyrophis klemmeri =

Conservation status
- Data Deficient (IUCN 3.1)

Scientific classification
- Kingdom: Animalia
- Phylum: Chordata
- Class: Reptilia
- Order: Squamata
- Suborder: Serpentes
- Family: Typhlopidae
- Genus: Argyrophis
- Species: A. klemmeri

Binomial name
- Argyrophis klemmeri (Taylor, 1962)

Synonyms
- Typhlops klemmeri Taylor, 1962; Asiatyphlops klemmeri — Hedges et al., 2014; Argyrophis klemmeri — Pyron & Wallach, 2014

Species of snake

Argyrophis klemmeri, also known commonly as Klemmer's blind snake and the Kuala Lumpur worm snake, is a species of Asian snake in the family Typhlopidae.

== Description ==
For a typhlopid, A. klemmeri is relatively thick-bodied; its length is only 28 times its width. It has 23 rows of scales around the body. In the vertebral scale row, there are 292 scales from the rostral to the caudal scale.

== Geographic range ==
A. klemmeri is found in western Malaysia.

== Habitat ==
The preferred natural habitat of A. klemmeri is forest.

== Behavior ==
A. klemmeri is fossorial.

== Etymology ==
The specific name, klemmeri, is in honor of German herpetologist Konrad Klemmer.

== Reproduction ==
A. klemmeri is oviparous.

== Conservation ==
The area from which the holotype of A. klemmeri was collected is unprotected. The specific threats to the species are unknown. It is classified as "Data Deficient" by the International Union for Conservation of Nature (IUCN).
