= Argyrophis =

Scientific classification
- Kingdom: Animalia
- Phylum: Chordata
- Class: Reptilia
- Order: Squamata
- Suborder: Serpentes
- Family: Typhlopidae
- Genus: Argyrophis; Gray, 1845

Genus of snakes

Argyrophis is a genus of snakes in the family Typhlopidae.

== Distribution ==
The 12 species of the genus Argyrophis are found throughout Asia.

== Species ==
The following species are recognized as being valid.

- Argyrophis bothriorhynchus (Günther, 1864)
- Argyrophis diardii (Schlegel, 1839)
- Argyrophis fuscus (A.H.A. Duméril, 1851)
- Argyrophis giadinhensis (Bourret, 1937)
- Argyrophis hypsobothrius (F. Werner, 1917)
- Argyrophis klemmeri (Taylor, 1962)
- Argyrophis koshunensis (Ōshima, 1916)
- Argyrophis muelleri (Schlegel, 1839)
- Argyrophis oatesii (Boulenger, 1890)
- Argyrophis roxaneae (Wallach, 2001)
- Argyrophis siamensis (Günther, 1864)
- Argyrophis trangensis (Taylor, 1962)

Nota bene: A binomial authority in parentheses indicates that the species was originally described in a genus other than Argyrophis.
