= Vietnam worm snake =

Scientific classification
- Kingdom: Animalia
- Phylum: Chordata
- Class: Reptilia
- Order: Squamata
- Suborder: Serpentes
- Family: Typhlopidae
- Genus: Argyrophis
- Species: A. giadinhensis

Binomial name
- Argyrophis giadinhensis (Bourret, 1937)

Synonyms
- Typhlops giadinhensis; Asiatyphlops giadinhensis

Species of snake

Vietnam worm snake (Argyrophis giadinhensis) is a species of snake in the family Typhlopidae. It is endemic to Vietnam.
