= Neill's long-tailed giant rat =

Conservation status
- Least Concern (IUCN 3.1)

Scientific classification
- Kingdom: Animalia
- Phylum: Chordata
- Class: Mammalia
- Order: Rodentia
- Family: Muridae
- Genus: Leopoldamys
- Species: L. neilli

Binomial name
- Leopoldamys neilli (Marshall, 1976)
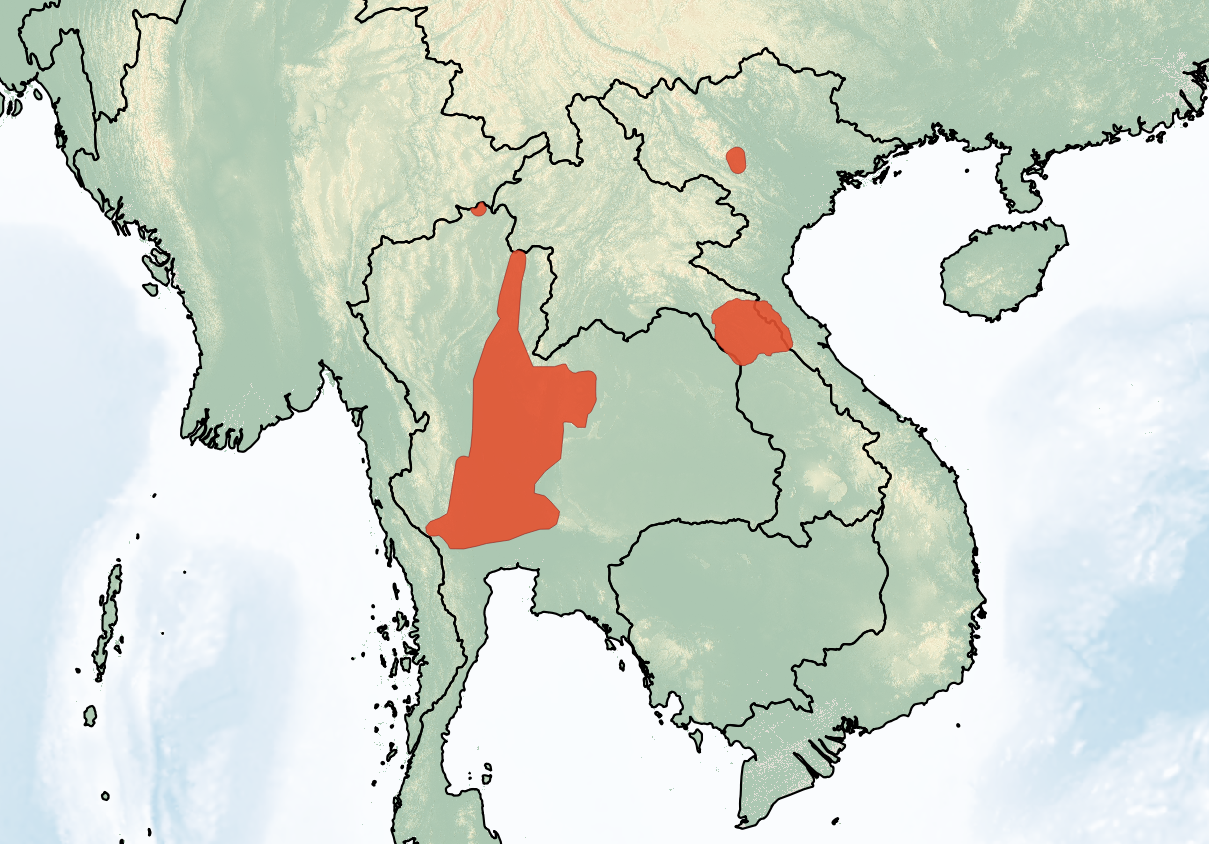

Species of rodent

Neill's long-tailed giant rat (Leopoldamys neilli) is a species of rodent in the family Muridae. It is found in Thailand, Laos, Vietnam, and possibly Myanmar.

Its natural habitats are subtropical or tropical dry shrubland and rocky areas. Leopoldamys neilli is threatened by the destruction of limestone karst habitats.

Six highly differentiated genetic lineages of Leopoldamys neilli were found in Kanchanaburi, West Central (Saraburi-Lopburi), East Central (Saraburi-Nakhon Ratchasima), Loei, Nan, and Phrae provinces of Thailand respectively. Gene flow among lineages is low.

== See also ==
- Limestone rat
