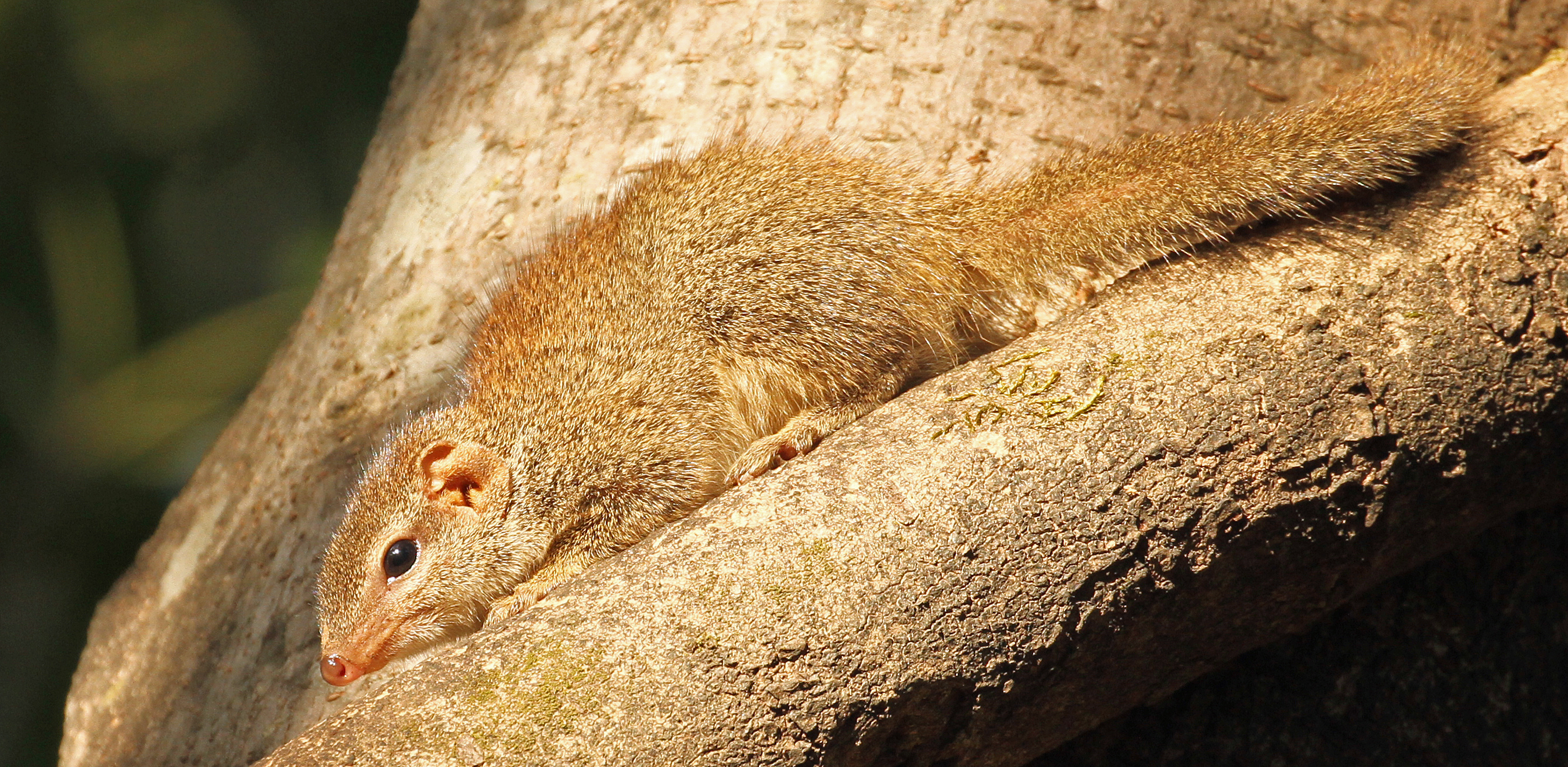
- In Satpura National Park, Pachmarhi

Conservation status
- Least Concern (IUCN 3.1)
- CITES Appendix II

Scientific classification
- Kingdom: Animalia
- Phylum: Chordata
- Class: Mammalia
- Order: Scandentia
- Family: Tupaiidae
- Genus: Anathana; Lyon, 1913
- Species: A. ellioti

Binomial name
- Anathana ellioti (Waterhouse, 1850)
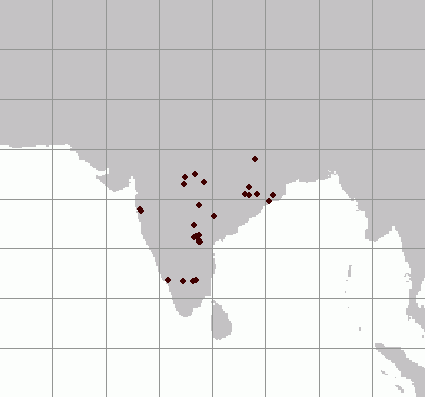
- Madras treeshrew range

= Madras treeshrew =

Species of mammal

The Madras treeshrew (Anathana ellioti), also known as the Indian treeshrew, is a species of treeshrew in the monotypic genus Anathana found in the hill forests of central and southern India, occasionally found as far east as the Sunderban mangrove forests. The genus name is derived from the Tamil name of moongil anathaan (literally "bamboo squirrel") and the species name is after Sir Walter Elliot of the Indian Civil Services in Madras.

== Description ==
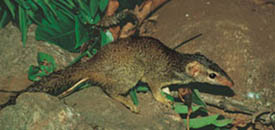
A. e. ellioti from Yercaud, Tamil Nadu

This treeshrew is 16.0 to 18.5 cm long with a tail of 16.5 to 19.5 cm. The nominate race (type locality: Eastern Ghats, Madras. British Museum 50.1.21.5) has the tail coloured like the back, the ground colour above being reddish-brown while the feet and hind legs are buff or ochraceous. The other two races have the tail coloured differently from the back. The race A. e. pallida (type locality: Manbhum, Bengal, collected by Robert Cecil Beavan British Museum 66.12.28.2) has the colour of body above reddish-brown and the feet and hind legs grizzled buffy. Race A. e. wroughtoni (type locality: Mandvi, Surat, collected by R. C. Wroughton British Museum 96.11.7.1) has the colour of body above dull grizzled brownish and the feet and hind legs grizzled greyish. Some later workers lumped all the three races, which was subsequently resolved to be only two subspecies - A. e. pallida and A. e. ellioti.

Its dental formula is 2.1.3.33.1.3.3 × 2 = 38. The dentition is suited for an omnivorous diet.

Some authors have suggested this species could be included within the genus Tupaia, although most have kept the genus separate based on anatomical differences.

== Distribution ==
The Madras treeshrew is found largely on the Indian Subcontinent south of the Ganges River. Three subspecies have been described — A. e. ellioti of the Eastern Ghats, Biligirirangan and the Shevaroy Hills and other hills of Southern India, A. e. pallida from Central India primarily in Madhya Pradesh and Raipur, and A. e. wroughtoni from the Satpura Range and the Dangs near Bombay. They have been reported within the Western Ghats ranges of Wayanad (Periya) and Mahabaleshwar. The northernmost record is from Garhwa district of Bihar. Little is known about the status of these populations as the distribution is patchy, but S. M. Mohnot considered them as "common" in 1975. A single record is from the Sunderban mangroves, and there are no details available to identify the subspecies of the observation.

== Behaviour and ecology ==
Rest posture of the Madras treeshrew

This species of treeshrew is not particularly arboreal and spends much of its time on the ground or clambering about on rocky terrain in the search of insects and seeds. It is easily separated from the squirrels in the field by the shape and color of the tail and the upward curve in which it is held when walking about.

They have a behaviour of climbing up low, slanting trunks and sliding down headfirst. This may be associated with scent marking, as many of the Scandentia have scent glands on their throats.

A species of sucking louse Docophthirus acinetus is found only on this species, the genus itself being restricted to hosts in the family Tupaiidae. Endoparasitic microfiliriae have also been described from the species. The Crested Hawk-eagle (Nisaetus cirrhatus) has been known to prey on this tree shrew.

The Madras Treeshrew is sometimes killed by vehicular traffic on roads inside protected reserves in India.
