= Dendrogale =

Scientific classification
- Kingdom: Animalia
- Phylum: Chordata
- Class: Mammalia
- Order: Scandentia
- Family: Tupaiidae
- Genus: Dendrogale; J. E. Gray, 1848

Type species
- Hylogalea murina Schlegel & S. Müller, 1843

Species
- Dendrogale melanura; Dendrogale murina
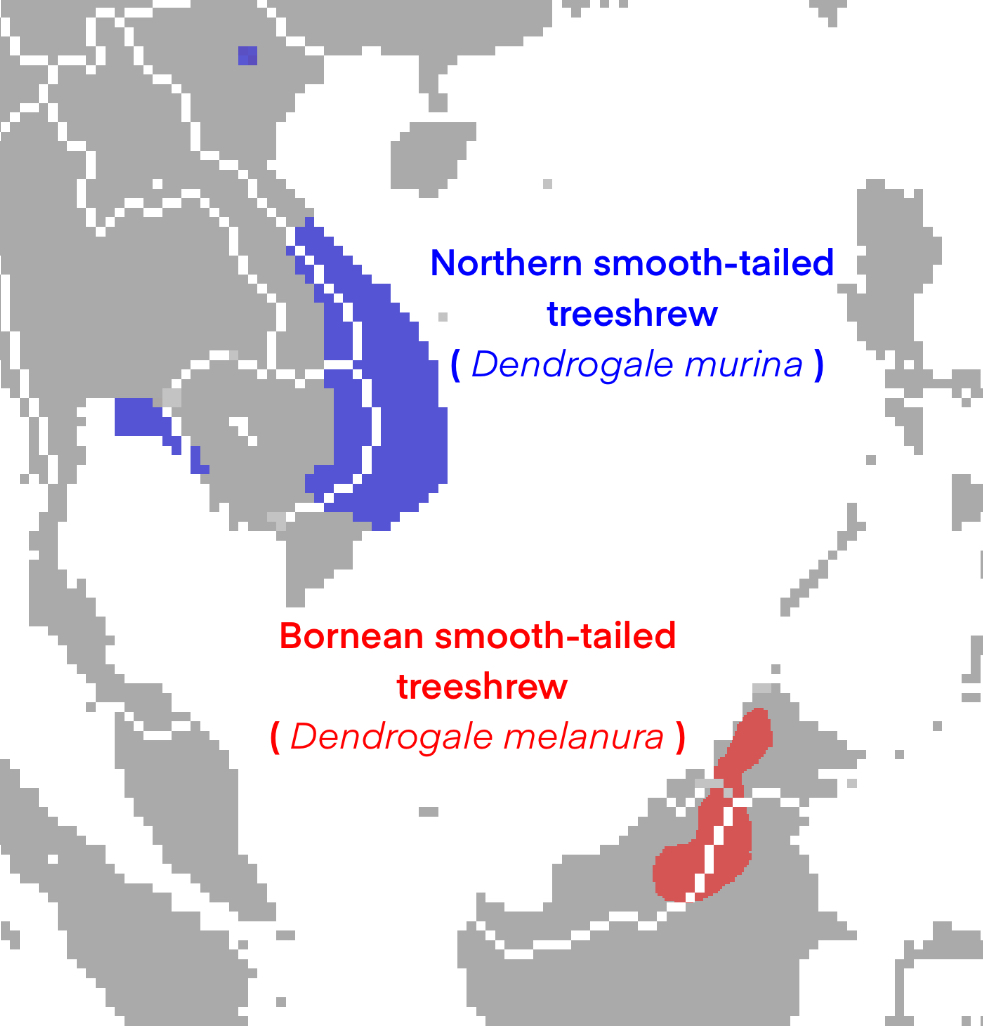

Genus of mammals

Dendrogale is a genus of treeshrew in the family Tupaiidae found in Southeast Asia and Borneo. It contains these species:

- Bornean smooth-tailed treeshrew (D. melanura)
- Northern smooth-tailed treeshrew (D. murina)

Dendrogale diverged from the rest of the Tupaiidae family at 34.77 mya, and is considered the most basal tupaiid genus.
