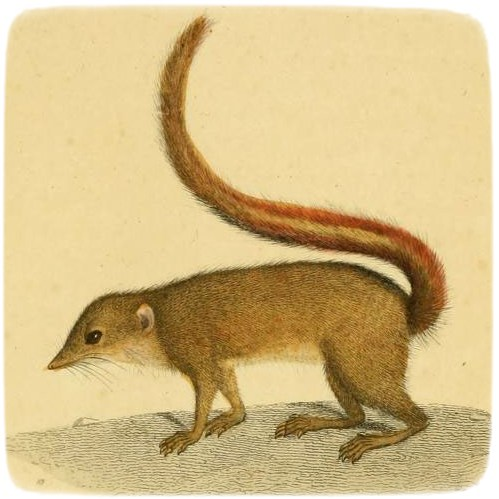

Conservation status
- Data Deficient (IUCN 3.1)
- CITES Appendix II (CITES)

Scientific classification
- Kingdom: Animalia
- Phylum: Chordata
- Class: Mammalia
- Order: Scandentia
- Family: Tupaiidae
- Genus: Tupaia
- Species: T. dorsalis

Binomial name
- Tupaia dorsalis Schlegel, 1857
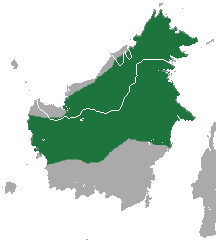
- Striped treeshrew range

= Striped treeshrew =

Species of mammal

The striped treeshrew (Tupaia dorsalis) is a treeshrew species within the Tupaiidae. It is endemic to Borneo and known only from a few individuals in Sabah, Sarawak, Brunei and Kalimantan.
