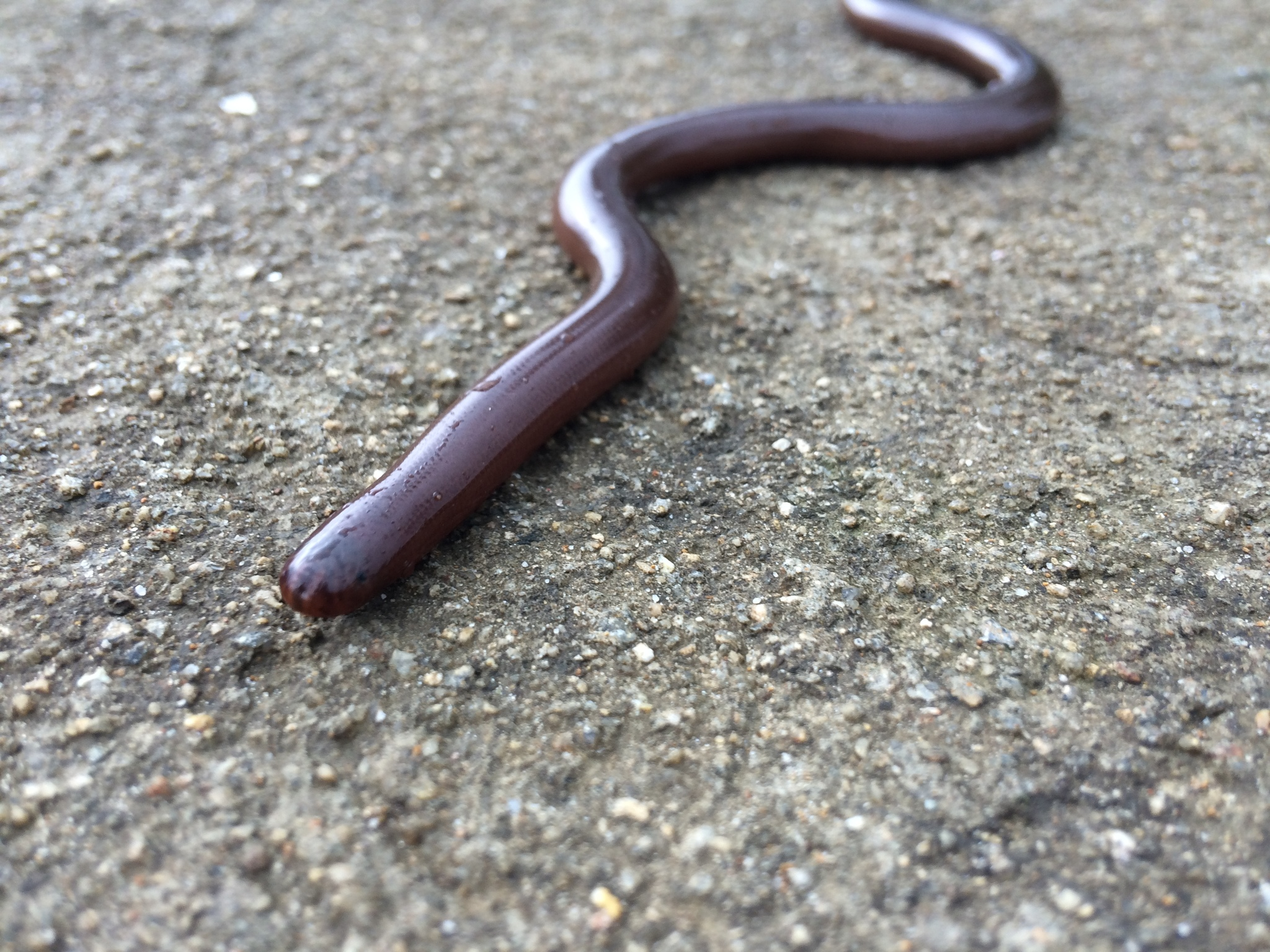

Conservation status
- Least Concern (IUCN 3.1)

Scientific classification
- Kingdom: Animalia
- Phylum: Chordata
- Class: Reptilia
- Order: Squamata
- Suborder: Serpentes
- Family: Typhlopidae
- Genus: Argyrophis
- Species: A. diardii

Binomial name
- Argyrophis diardii Schlegel, 1839

Synonyms
- List: Typhlops Diardii Schlegel, 1839; Typhlops Mülleri Schlegel, 1839; Typhlops nigro-albus A.M.C. Duméril & Bibron, 1844; Argyrophis bicolor Gray, 1845; Argyrophis Horsfieldii Gray, 1845; Typhlops striolatus W. Peters, 1861; T[yphlops]. (Typhlops) nigroalbus — Jan, 1863; T[yphlops]. (Typhlops) Schneideri Jan, 1863; T[yphlops]. (Typhlops) Diardi — Jan, 1863; T[yphlops]. (Typhlops) Mülleri — Jan, 1863; T[yphlops]. Diardi — Jan & Sordelli, 1864; T[yphlops]. bicolor — Jan & Sordelli, 1864; T[yphlops]. Mülleri — Jan & Sordelli, 1864; T[yphlops]. nigroalbus — Jan & Sordelli, 1864; Typhlops horsfieldii — Günther, 1864; T[yphlops]. Schneideri — Jan & Sordelli, 1865; Tychlpos Diardii — Steindachner, 1867; Typhlops barmanus Stoliczka, 1872; Typhlops diardi — Boulenger, 1893; Typhlops muelleri — Boulenger, 1893; Typhlops nigroalbus — Boulenger, 1893; Typhlops schneideri — Boulenger, 1893; Typhlops kapaladua Annandale, 1906; Typhlops tephrosoma Wall, 1908; [Typhlops diardi] var. cinereus Wall, 1909; Typhlops labialis Waite, 1918; Typhlops diardi diardi — M.A. Smith, 1923; Typhlops diardi nigroalbus — M.A. Smith, 1923; Typhlops fusconotus Brongersma, 1934; Typhlops diardi mülleri — Brongersma, 1934; Typhlops diardi — Bourret, 1936; Typhlops d[ardi]. tephrosoma — Bourret, 1936; Typhlops diardi diardi — Hahn, 1980; Typhlops muelleri — Hahn, 1980; Typhlops diardii — McDiarmid, Campbell & Touré, 1999; Asiatyphlops diardii — Hedges et al., 2014; Argyrophis diardii — Pyron & Wallach, 2014

= Argyrophis diardii =

Species of snake

Argyrophis diardii, commonly known as Diard's blind snake, the Indochinese blind snake, the large blind snake, and the large worm snake, is a species of harmless snake in the family Typhlopidae. The species is native to South Asia and Southeast Asia. There are two recognized subspecies.

== Taxonomy ==
Argyrophis diardii was first described by German herpetologist Hermann Schlegel in 1839, as Typhlops Diardii. The type locality of Schlegel's specimen was "Cochinchina [southern Vietnam]". Saint Girons (1972: 32) described it as "Cochinchina sans certitude [southern Vietnam without certainty]", and Hahn (1980: 56) as "East Indies".

=== Etymology ===
Both the specific name, diardii, and the common name, "Diard's blindsnake", are in honor of French naturalist Pierre-Médard Diard.

The synonym, Typhlops Mülleri Schlegel, 1839, was named in honor of German naturalist Salomon Müller.

=== Subspecies ===
Two subspecies of Argyrophis diardii are recognized as being valid, including the nominotypical subspecies:

- Argyrophis diardii diardii Schlegel, 1839
- Argyrophis diardii platyventris Khan, 1998

== Description ==
Argyrophis diardii is heavy-bodied for a blindsnake. It has 22–25 scale rows around the body at midbody. The belly is distinctly flat.

== Geographic distribution ==
Argyrophis diardii is found in India (Jalpaiguri-West Bengal, as far west as Dun Valley in Assam), Bangladesh, Myanmar, Thailand, Laos, Cambodia, Vietnam, the Malay Peninsula, Nias Island, Sumatra, Web Island (off northwest Sumatra), Bangka, and Borneo.

== Habitat ==
The preferred natural habitats of Argyrophis diardii are forest, shrubland, and grassland, at elevations of 30–1,524 m (98–5,000 ft), and it has also been found in agricultural areas.

== Diet ==
Argyrophis diardii preys upon earthworms, insect larvae, and adult insects.

== Reproduction ==
The mode of reproduction of Argyrophis diardii is uncertain. The species may be either oviparous or ovoviviparous.
