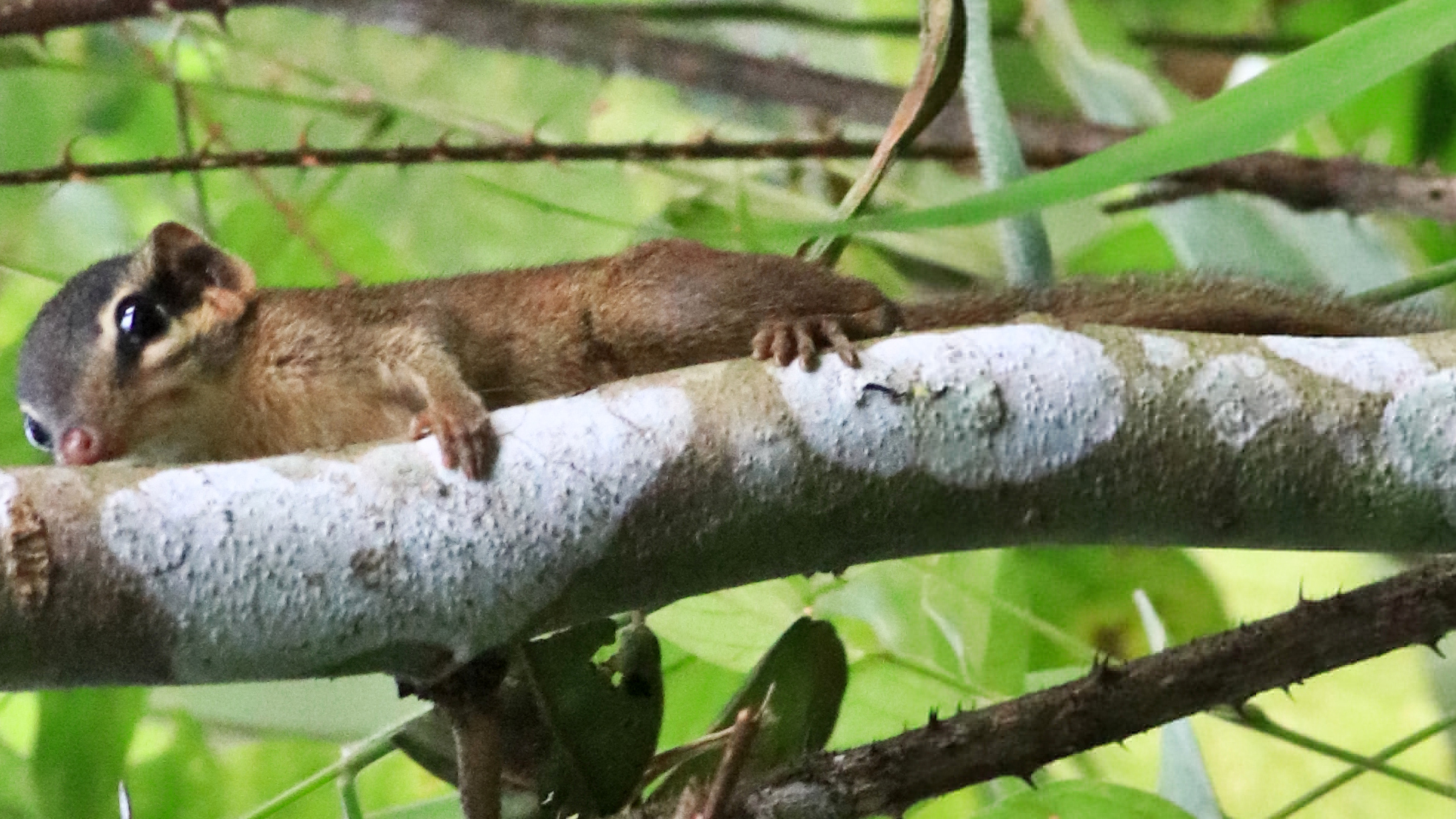
- The northern smooth-tailed treeshrew from Cat Tien National Park, Vietnam

Conservation status
- Least Concern (IUCN 3.1)
- CITES Appendix II

Scientific classification
- Kingdom: Animalia
- Phylum: Chordata
- Class: Mammalia
- Order: Scandentia
- Family: Tupaiidae
- Genus: Dendrogale
- Species: D. murina

Binomial name
- Dendrogale murina (Schlegel & S. Müller, 1843)
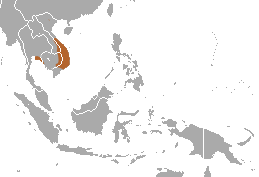
- Northern smooth-tailed treeshrew range

= Northern smooth-tailed treeshrew =

Species of mammal

The northern smooth-tailed treeshrew (Dendrogale murina) is a species of treeshrew in the family Tupaiidae found in Cambodia, Thailand, and Vietnam. Their diet primarily consists of invertebrates but rarely includes fruits and plants.

The northern smooth-tailed treeshrew inhabits tropical forests and disturbed areas, especially in dense bamboo and rattan thickets. It is commonly found along forest edges, stream valleys, and roadside bamboo groves.
