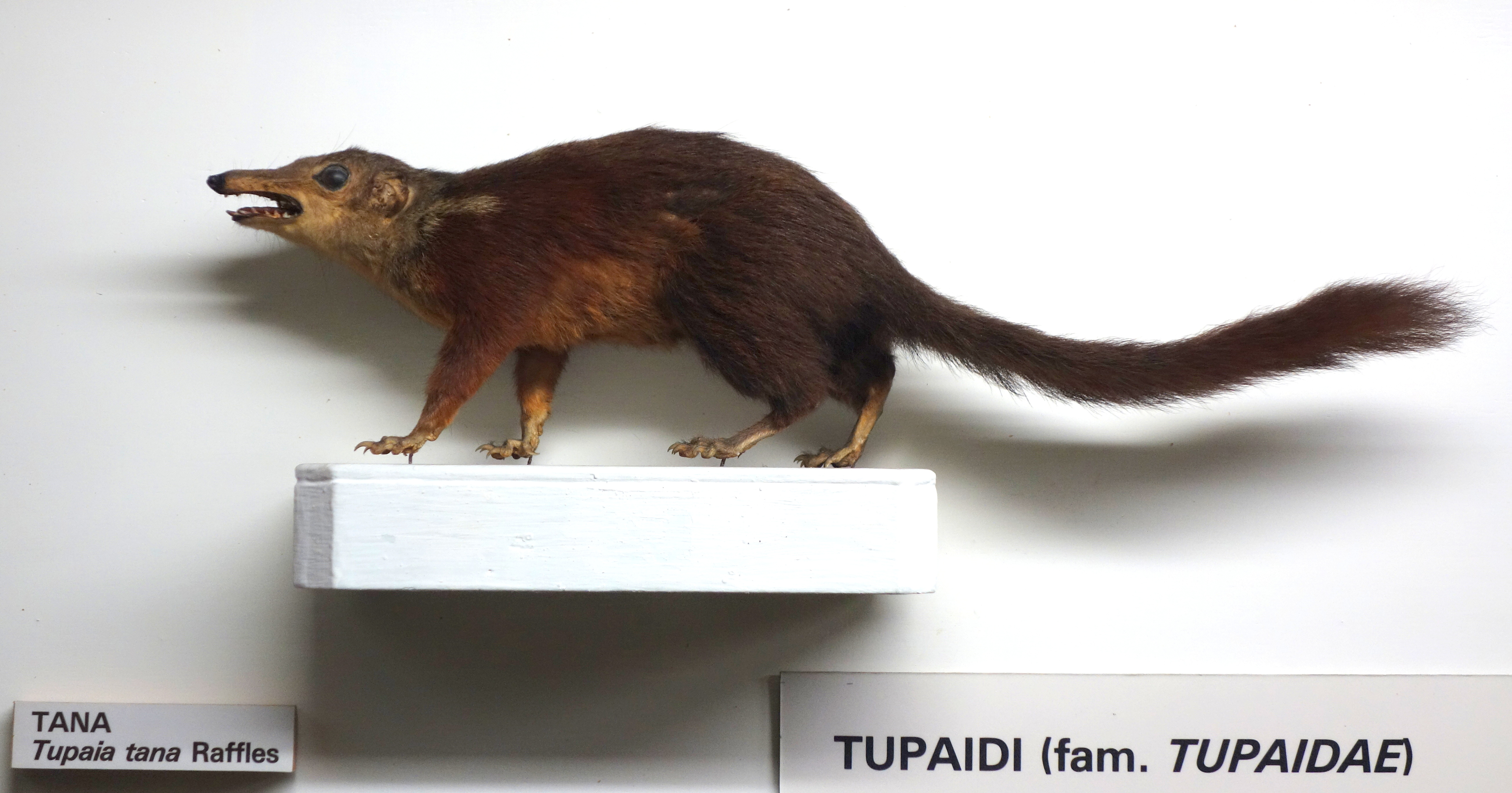

Conservation status
- Least Concern (IUCN 3.1)
- CITES Appendix II (CITES)

Scientific classification
- Kingdom: Animalia
- Phylum: Chordata
- Class: Mammalia
- Order: Scandentia
- Family: Tupaiidae
- Genus: Tupaia
- Species: T. tana

Binomial name
- Tupaia tana Raffles, 1821
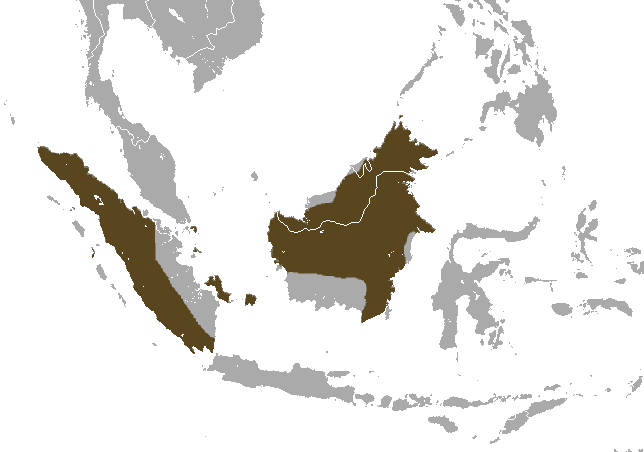
- Large treeshrew range

= Large treeshrew =

Species of mammal

The large treeshrew (Tupaia tana) is a treeshrew species within the Tupaiidae. It is native to Sumatra and adjacent small islands, as well as in the lowlands and hills of Borneo.

== Habitat ==
Large treeshrews are the most predominantly terrestrial of all treeshrew species. They are usually on the forest floor, the primary location for their foraging, although they spend part of their time in trees. T. tana has been described as mainly terrestrial based on field observations and their morphological traits. Large treeshrews are most abundant in primary tropical rainforest, but are also found in swamp forest and secondary growth forest. T. tana has many potential predators such as the marbled cat, leopard, and clouded leopard.

Large treeshrews contribute to the maintenance of their lowland rainforest ecosystem by dispersing seeds.

== Description ==
Tupaia tana is slightly larger than the common treeshrew (T. glis). The dorsal fur is reddish brown, shading to nearly black at the rear. There is a black stripe running from the neck half to two-thirds of the way down the back until it disappears in the darker posterior fur.

The body size measurements of this species are:

- Head and body: 165–321 mm (6.5–12.6 in)
- Tail: 130–220 mm (5.1–8.7 in)
- Hind foot: 43–57 mm (1.7–2.2 in)
- Weight: 154–305 g (5.4–10.8 oz)

The snout is long: the distance from the center of the eye to the tip of the muzzle is more than 37 mm (1.5 in) in adults.

Tupaia tana has sensitive hearing and large eyes that give it acute night vision but poor daylight vision.

== Diet ==
Their diet consists of earthworms and arthropods such as centipedes, millipedes, and beetle larvae, with some fruit. Less favored arthropods include ants, beetles, spiders, cockroaches, and crickets.

== Reproduction ==
The average age of reproductive maturity for both males and females is around one year of age. The female almost always gives birth to two altricial young. The fecundity of females is reduced in poor-quality territories or during periods of resource scarcity.
