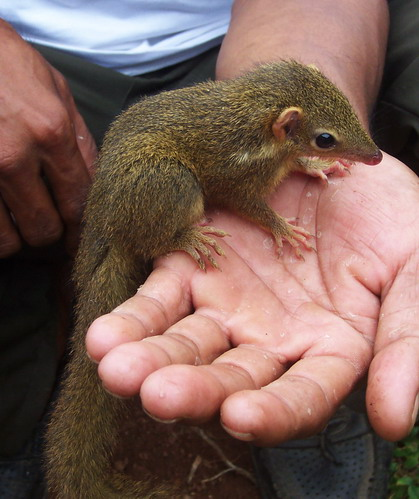
- Tupaia in West Java, Indonesia

Scientific classification
- Kingdom: Animalia
- Phylum: Chordata
- Class: Mammalia
- Order: Scandentia
- Family: Tupaiidae; Gray, 1825

Type genus
- Tupaia Raffles, 1821

Genera
- Anathana; Dendrogale; †Palaeotupaia; †Prodendrogale; †Sivatupaia; Tupaia
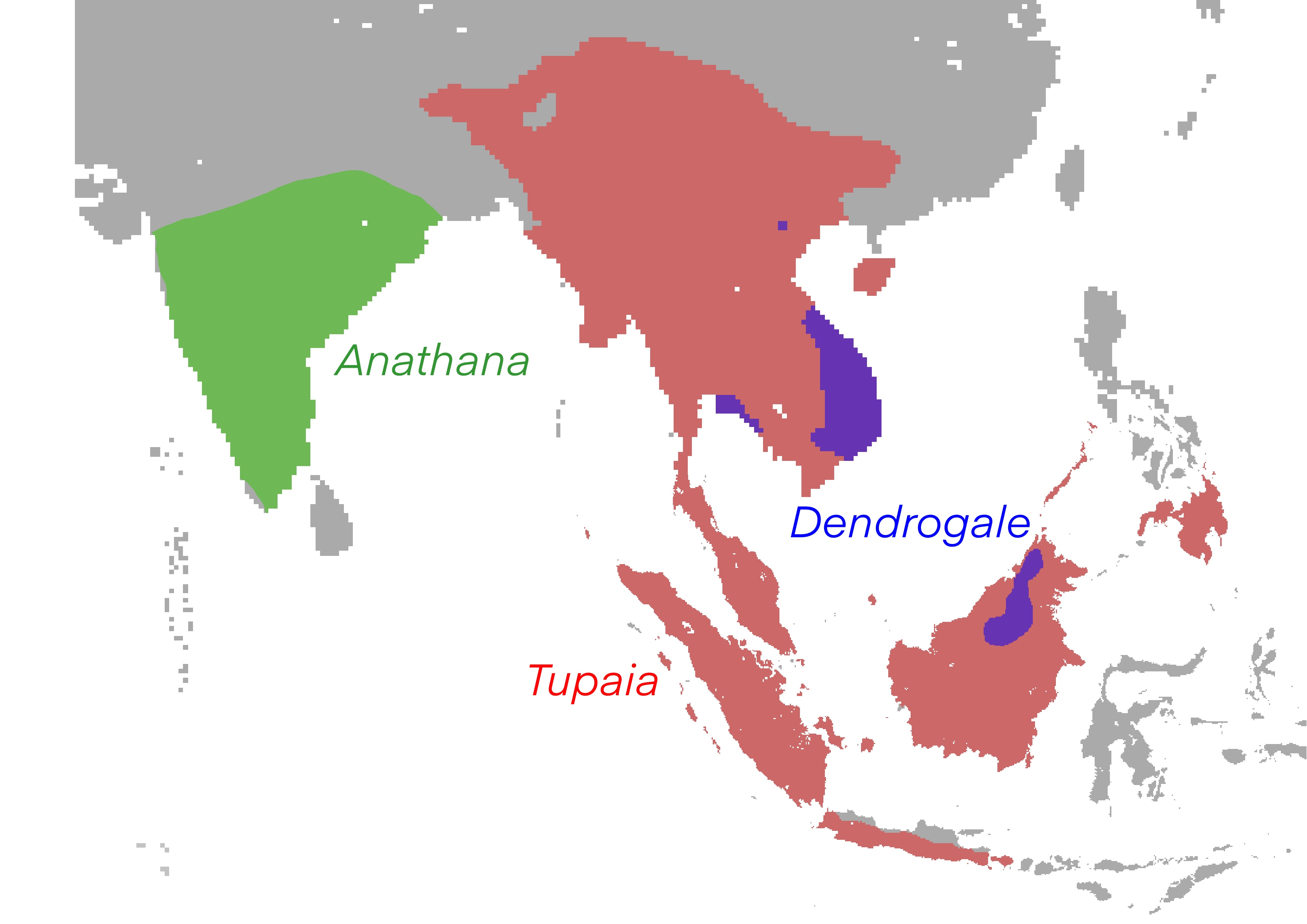
- Red: Tupaia, Green: Anathana, Blue: Dendrogale, Purple: both Dendrogale and Tupaia

Synonyms
- Cladobatae; Cladobatidina; Cladobatida; Cladobatina; Glisoricina; Glisoricinae; Tupaina; Tupaiadae; Tupajidae; Tupayae; Tupayidae

= Tupaiidae =

Family of mammals

Tupaiidae is one of two families of treeshrews, the other family being Ptilocercidae. The family contains three living genera and 19 living species. The family name derives from tupai, the Malay word for treeshrew and also for squirrel which tupaiids superficially resemble. The former genus Urogale was disbanded in 2011 when the Mindanao treeshrew was moved to Tupaia based on a molecular phylogeny.

Unlike shrews, they possess a fairly large brain for their size. While some research has found treeshrews as the closest living relative to primates, most molecular studies currently find the flying lemurs (colugos) as the sister group to primates despite their gliding specializations.

== Taxonomy ==
- Genus Anathana
  - Madras treeshrew, A. ellioti
- Genus Dendrogale
  - Bornean smooth-tailed treeshrew, D. melanura
  - Northern smooth-tailed treeshrew, D. murina
- Genus Tupaia
  - Northern treeshrew, T. belangeri
  - Golden-bellied treeshrew, T. chrysogaster
  - Striped treeshrew, T. dorsalis
  - Mindanao treeshrew, T. everetti
  - Common treeshrew, T. glis
  - Slender treeshrew, T. gracilis
  - Horsfield's treeshrew, T. javanica
  - Long-footed treeshrew, T. longipes
  - Pygmy treeshrew, T. minor
  - Calamian treeshrew, T. moellendorffi
  - Mountain treeshrew, T. montana
  - Nicobar treeshrew, T. nicobarica
  - Palawan treeshrew, T. palawanensis
  - Painted treeshrew, T. picta
  - Ruddy treeshrew, T. splendidula
  - Large treeshrew, T. tana

== Conservation ==
A majority of the species, 71.4%, in this family are of least concern, according to the IUCN red list. Nearly a twentieth of the species, 4.8%, are vulnerable and the same number are endangered. 19% of the species have not had enough data collected yet for them to be rated on the scale.
