= Bornean smooth-tailed treeshrew =

Conservation status
- Data Deficient (IUCN 3.1)
- CITES Appendix II

Scientific classification
- Kingdom: Animalia
- Phylum: Chordata
- Class: Mammalia
- Order: Scandentia
- Family: Tupaiidae
- Genus: Dendrogale
- Species: D. melanura

Binomial name
- Dendrogale melanura (Thomas, 1892)
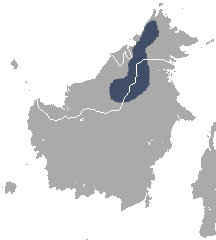
- Bornean smooth-tailed treeshrew range

Species of mammal

The Bornean smooth-tailed treeshrew (Dendrogale melanura) is a species of treeshrew in the family Tupaiidae. It is endemic to Borneo. Its natural habitat is subtropical or tropical dry forests. It is threatened by habitat loss.

== Description ==
The head and body length of the species is 5 inches (13 cm), with tail length 4.5 inches (11 cm). The body mass is about 1.5 oz (43 g). Upper parts of the small body are dark brown, while the under parts are orange-buff with gray bases, and shiny black with reddish streaking along the sides. It has a short snout, with large ear flaps. Prominent orange-brown rings exist around the eyes, with weakly marked facial streaks present on both side of the face, extending from the snout to ears. No shoulder streaks are present. The claws are notably sharp. The thin tail is covered with fine, smooth hair, with darkening towards the tip. D. m. melanura has darker colour above and more reddish below than D. m. baluensis.

== Habitat ==
D. melanura is a terrestrial species. They are diurnal and predominantly arboreal. Live in evergreen rainforest, which active in mossy trees and on rocky boulders in submontane and montane pristine forest. This species seems to feed predominantly on insects.

== Distribution ==
The species is endemic to Borneo, restricted in the mountains of the northwest above 900 m (3,000 ft), including the mountain of northeastern Sarawak, Gunung Kinabalu, and Gunung Trus Madi in Sabah. D. m. melanura is recorded from Gunung Dulit, Gunung Mulu, and the Kelabit uplands in northern Sarawak, and from the Sabah-Sarawak border. Meanwhile, D. m. baluensis is recorded from Gunung Kinabalu and Gunung Trus Madi in Sabah.

== Status ==
This species is listed as data deficient because it has not been recorded since the early 1970s; it was formerly listed as Vulnerable from 1996 to 2008. The major threats for this species are loss of habitat due to the agricultural expansion and conversion of land to nontree plantations at lower elevations. This species may warrant listing in Near Threatened or higher. The conservation actions only occur at Crocker Range National Park, Sabah, Malaysia.
