= Mentawai long-tailed giant rat =

Conservation status
- Vulnerable (IUCN 3.1)

Scientific classification
- Kingdom: Animalia
- Phylum: Chordata
- Class: Mammalia
- Order: Rodentia
- Family: Muridae
- Genus: Leopoldamys
- Species: L. siporanus

Binomial name
- Leopoldamys siporanus (Thomas, 1895)

Species of rodent

The Mentawai long-tailed giant rat (Leopoldamys siporanus) is a species of rodent in the family Muridae. It is endemic to the Mentawai Islands archipelago off the west coast of Sumatra, in Indonesia. Its natural habitat is subtropical or tropical dry forest. It is threatened by habitat loss.
