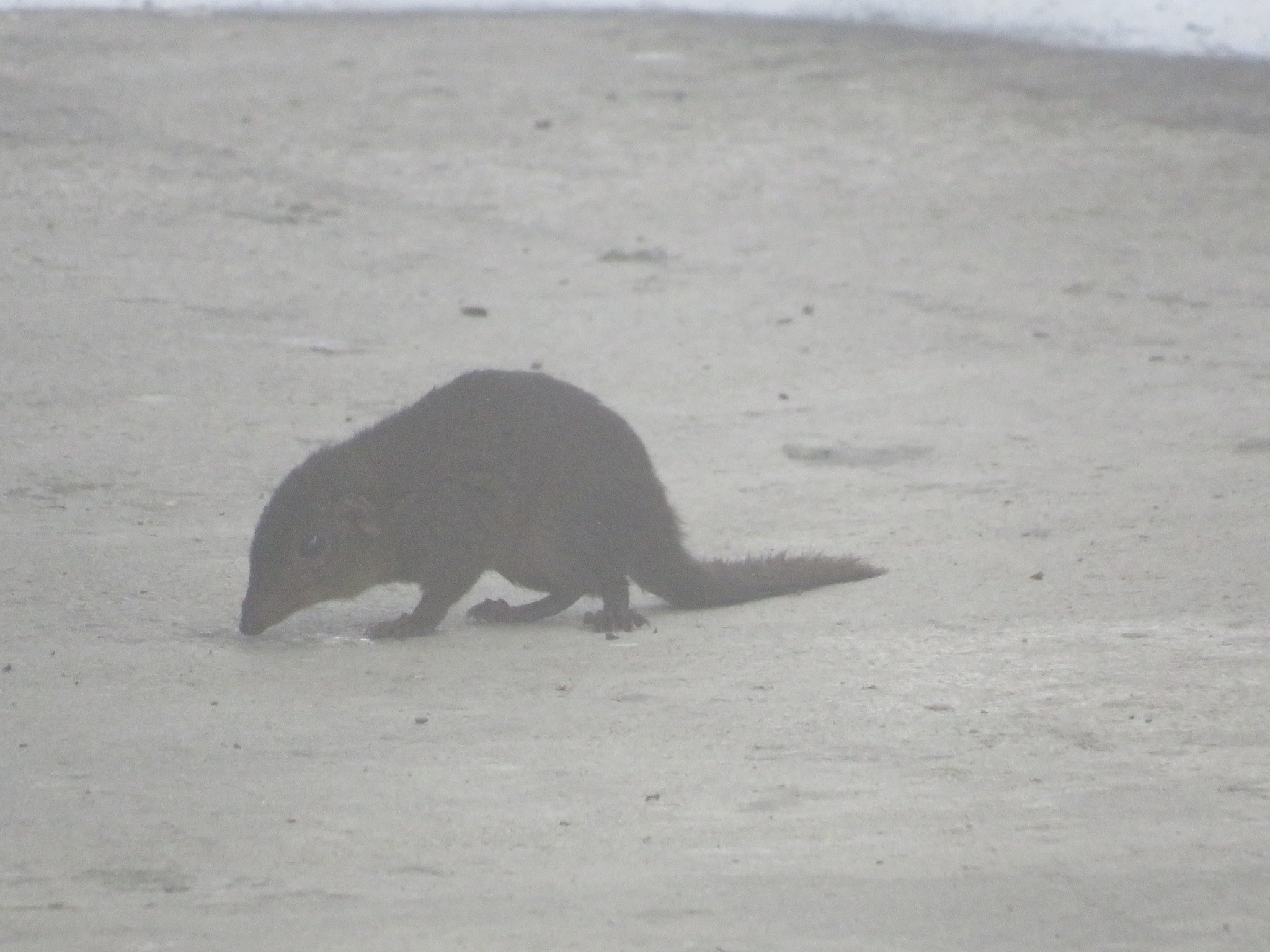

Conservation status
- Least Concern (IUCN 3.1)
- CITES Appendix II (CITES)

Scientific classification
- Kingdom: Animalia
- Phylum: Chordata
- Class: Mammalia
- Order: Scandentia
- Family: Tupaiidae
- Genus: Tupaia
- Species: T. montana

Binomial name
- Tupaia montana Thomas, 1892
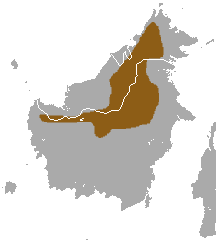
- Mountain treeshrew range

= Mountain treeshrew =

Species of mammal

The mountain treeshrew (Tupaia montana) is a treeshrew species within the Tupaiidae. It is endemic to Borneo and inhabits montane forests in Sarawak and Sabah, Malaysia, and Kalimantan, Indonesia, as well as a part of southeastern Brunei.

The first specimen was described by Oldfield Thomas and was part of a zoological collection from northern Borneo obtained by the British Museum of Natural History.

== Characteristics ==
The mountain treeshrew is dark grizzled rufous above with an indistinct black line along the back. Its tail is rather short and grizzled rufous above, but below more olivaceous yellow with a black tip. The lateral tail hairs are ringed. The head and body length measures 15–33 cm and the tail length measures 13–19 cm.

== Distribution and habitat ==
Charles Hose collected the first specimen at about 4,000 ft (1,200 m) on Mount Dulit. Mountain treeshrews have mostly been recorded in montane outcrops above 600 m (2,000 ft).

== Ecology and behaviour ==
In their natural habitat, mountain treeshrews were observed being active during the day. They forage on the ground among fallen logs and branches where they feed mostly on arthropods. They also consume large quantities of wild fruits and berries, eating them in short bursts. It is assumed that they extract sugar laden juices and in this way supplement any dietary deficiencies of an arthropod diet.

Results of a behavioral study of a group of 12 wild-caught captive mountain treeshrews indicate that they are more social than groups of other treeshrew species. Two males tended to dominate the group. Females had an estrous cycle lasting nine to 12 days. Gestation lasted 49 to 51 days. They did not display a distinct reproductive season. Litters comprised one to two young.

Mountain treeshrews have a mutualistic relationship with several pitcher plants species such as Nepenthes lowii, Nepenthes macrophylla, and Nepenthes rajah. They defecate into the plants' pitchers while visiting them to feed on sweet, fruity secretions from glands on the pitcher lids.
