= Edwards's long-tailed giant rat =

Conservation status
- Least Concern (IUCN 3.1)

Scientific classification
- Kingdom: Animalia
- Phylum: Chordata
- Class: Mammalia
- Order: Rodentia
- Family: Muridae
- Genus: Leopoldamys
- Species: L. edwardsi

Binomial name
- Leopoldamys edwardsi (Thomas, 1882)
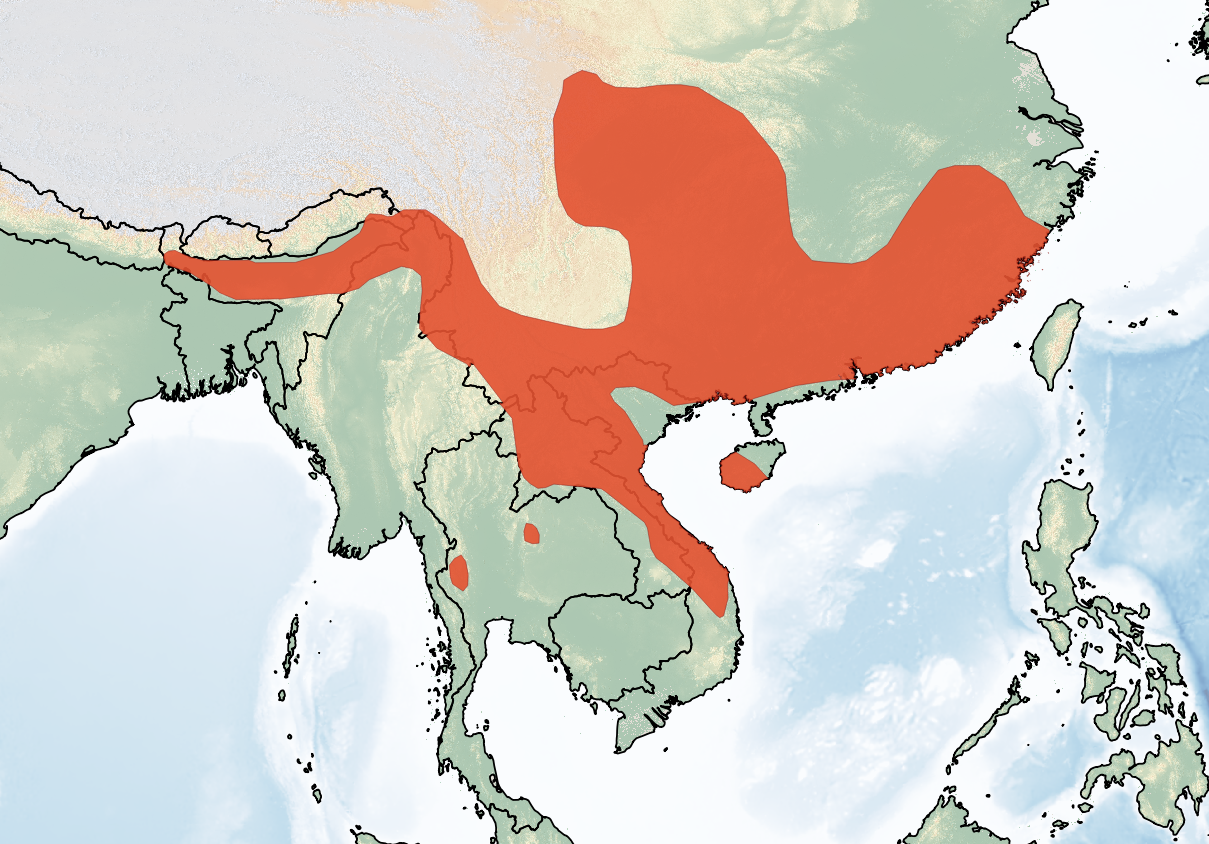

Species of rodent

Edwards's long-tailed giant rat (Leopoldamys edwardsi) is a species of rodent in the family Muridae. It is found in China, India, Indonesia, Laos, Malaysia, Burma, Thailand, and Vietnam.
