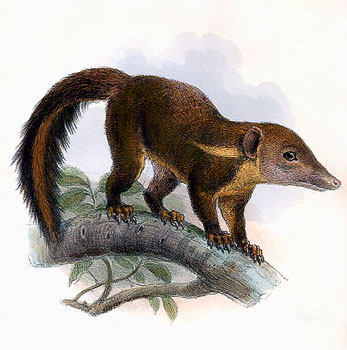

Conservation status
- Least Concern (IUCN 3.1)
- CITES Appendix II (CITES)

Scientific classification
- Kingdom: Animalia
- Phylum: Chordata
- Class: Mammalia
- Order: Scandentia
- Family: Tupaiidae
- Genus: Tupaia
- Species: T. splendidula

Binomial name
- Tupaia splendidula J. E. Gray, 1865
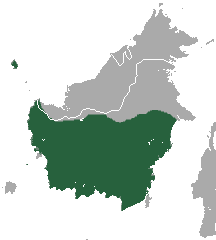
- Ruddy treeshrew range

= Ruddy treeshrew =

Species of mammal

The ruddy treeshrew (Tupaia splendidula) is a treeshrew species in the family Tupaiidae. It is endemic to Borneo, the Natuna Islands and the Anambas Islands.

== Habitat and threats ==
The ruddy treeshrew occurs in the forests of Indonesia. It lives at lower elevations, never occurring over 500 meters above sea level. Although listed as Least Concern, the ruddy treeshrew is still threatened by habitat loss, due to causes such as logging. Due to this, its population is slowly decreasing.

== Subspecies ==
The ruddy treeshrew has 5 subspecies, widely distributed throughout Indonesia:

- T. splendidula carimatae Miller, 1906 (Karimata Islands)
- T. splendidula lucida Thomas and Hartert, 1895 (Laut Island)
- T. splendidula natunae Lyon, 1911 (Natuna Besar)
- T. splendidula riabus Lyon, 1913 (Anambas Islands)
- T. splendidula splendidula Gray, 1865 (Southern Borneo)
