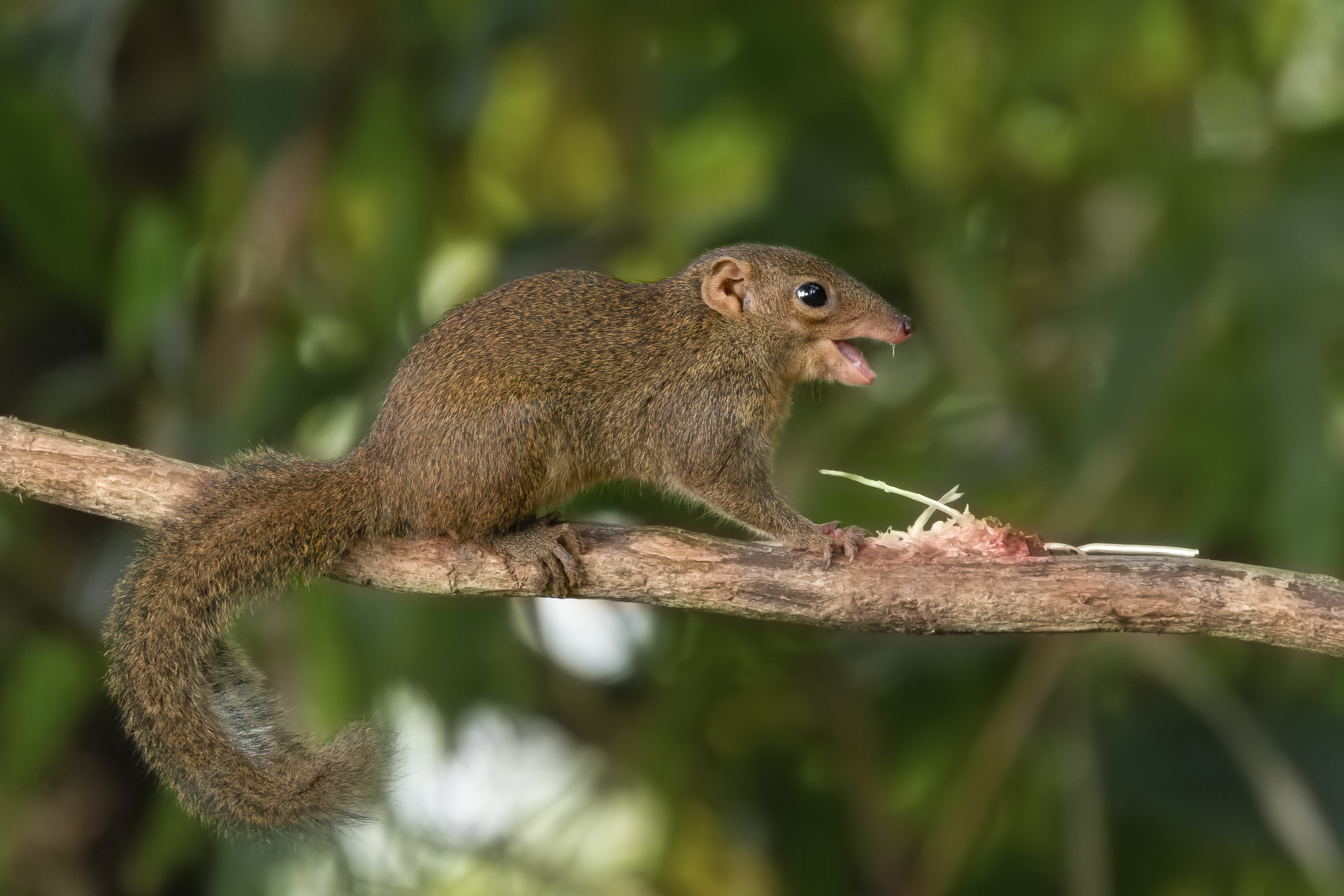
- Common treeshrew (Tupaia glis) in Latpanchar (Darjeeling_district), West Bengal, India.

Conservation status
- Least Concern (IUCN 3.1)
- CITES Appendix II

Scientific classification
- Kingdom: Animalia
- Phylum: Chordata
- Class: Mammalia
- Order: Scandentia
- Family: Tupaiidae
- Genus: Tupaia
- Species: T. glis

Binomial name
- Tupaia glis (Diard, 1820)
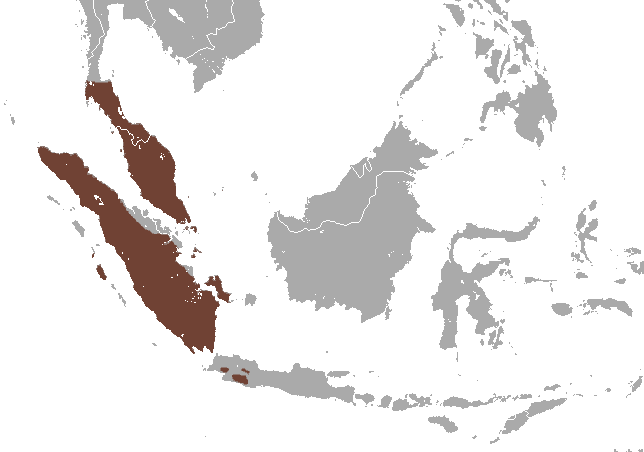
- Common treeshrew range

= Common treeshrew =

Species of mammal

The common treeshrew (Tupaia glis) is a small mammal in the treeshrew family Tupaiidae, and is native to Thailand, Malaysia, Singapore and Indonesia. It has been listed as Least Concern by IUCN as it remains common and displays some adaptability to ongoing habitat loss.

== Description ==
The common treeshrew is one of the largest among treeshrews. Average body length is between 16 and 21 cm (6.3 and 8.3 in), and average weight is around 190 g, with varying colours of reddish-brown, greyish or black upper parts and whitish belly. Its long, bushy tail is dark greyish-brown and almost reaches the length of the body. The paws are bare with sharp nails, and with a naked patch of skin above its long nose. Both sexes are similar. The animal has a head and body length of 13–21 cm and a tail length of 12–20 cm. The common treeshrew usually has a white, pale stripe on each shoulder.

The two subspecies are T. g. longipes and T. g. salatana, with T. g. longipes being duller in color than T. g. salatana. The underparts of T. g. longipes are dull buff to reddish-buff, and the underside of the tail is greyish. The underparts and underside of the tail are dark reddish in T. g. salatana. Similar species are Tupaia splendidula and Tupaia montana.

== Distribution and habitat ==
Common treeshrews occur south of about 10°N latitude in southern Thailand through mainland Malaysia and adjacent coastal islands to Singapore. They inhabit protected areas, including the Pasoh Forest Reserve on the Malay Peninsula and Krau Wildlife Reserve. In Indonesia, they are found on the islands of Siberut, Batu, Sumatra, Java, Bangka, Riau, Lingga and Anambas. Usually they are found in primary dipterocarp forest, but are tolerant to some degree of habitat modification. They have also been recorded from secondary forest, plantations, fruit orchards, and trees near housing areas.

Common treeshrews are probably present throughout the lowlands and hills up to 1,100 m (3,600 ft) in the Kelabit Highlands of Borneo. The subspecies T. g. longipes occurs in the north of Borneo, in Sarawak, and in East Kalimantan, including Sabah. The subspecies T. g. salatana occurs in the south of Rajang River and Kayan River in Borneo.

== Ecology and behavior ==
Common treeshrews are active during the day, and forage for food alone or in pairs, mainly on the ground, among shrubs and tree holes. They feed on fruits, seeds, leaves, and insects, especially ants and spiders. They are also reported to catch lizards.

They are very agile in climbing both large vertical tree trunks and bushes, and occasionally jump from stems of a young tree to that of another as much as 60 cm (24 in) away. Their climbing is concentrated in lower heights. They frequently scent-mark their territories by chest and anogenital rubbing with a secretion from glands on chest and scrotum. Adult males are more secretory than females and juveniles. In the Bukit Timah Nature Reserve, mean home ranges of adult males were estimated at 10,174 m^{2} (109,510 sq ft), of adult females at 8,809 m^{2} (94,820 sq ft), of juvenile males at 7,527 m^{2} (81,020 sq ft), and of juvenile females at 7,255 m^{2} (78,090 sq ft), with partial overlaps between male and female ranges varying from 0.4% to 56.8%. Home ranges of adult residents of the same sex overlap to a lesser degree than those of opposite sexes. A male's range may include the ranges of two or three females. A high overlap between ranges of one adult male and one adult female indicates they form a stable pair. Juvenile ranges of either sex adjoin or overlap with ranges of adults, suggesting the juveniles are family members. Individuals of the same sex are involved in aggressive territorial chases.

Juvenile males depart from their family's territory sooner than juvenile females.

=== Reproduction ===
Both sexes of common treeshrews are sexually mature at the age of about three months. In captivity, females give birth for the first time at the age of about 4.5 mo, usually in February. A postpartum oestrus results in more births in April. Their oestrus cycle is eight to 39 days, and the gestation period lasts 40 to 52 days, after which a litter of one to three individuals is born. The newborn offspring weigh about 10 to 12 grams. Females suckle their young every other day, and neglect their young as long as possible. They would not even be able to identify their own young if they did not mark them with the scent produced from glands in their sternum and abdomen. Juveniles leave the nest between 25 and 35 days of age. Longevity of a captive common treeshrew has been recorded as 12 yr and 5 mo.

From October to December, common treeshrews are reproductively inactive. The mating season starts at the onset of the monsoon season in December and lasts until February. Oestrus and proestrus behavior is characterized by adult males pursuing adult females. Males emit chattering, and appear to be extremely excited. They also chase each other and fight. Females do not actively choose a partner among the male participants of chases. The dominant male gains access to females.

In tropical rainforest habitats in West Malaysia, population density varies from two to five animals per hectare. Their annual breeding coincides with the abundance of invertebrates after the dry season. Their main reproductive period is between February and June, and their litter size is invariably two. Some females breed more than once a season, and the age at first pregnancy is seven months. The main period of emigration or mortality of young is during the breeding period or monsoon.

== Taxonomic status ==
The species was first described in February 1820 by the French explorers Pierre-Médard Diard and Alfred Duvaucel in their jointly written article "Sur une nouvelle espèce de Sorex — Sorex Glis", which is preceded by an illustration. They observed specimens in Penang and Singapore, and considered them a species of Sorex, and not as a new genus. Between 1821 and 1940, several zoologists described the species from other areas. The species still retains many forms of uncertain rank and validity, and is pending a detailed study. Some forms were formerly considered synonyms of Tupaia glis; some were elevated to species level. Synonyms include:

- ferruginea (Raffles, 1821)
- press (Raffles, 1821)
- hypochrysa (Thomas, 1895)
- chrysomalla (Miller, 1900)
- sordida (Miller, 1900)
- phaeura (Miller, 1902)
- castanea (Miller, 1903)
- pulonis (Miller, 1903)
- tephrura (Miller, 1903)
- demissa (Thomas, 1904)
- discolor (Lyon, 1906)
- batamana (Lyon, 1907)
- siaca (Lyon, 1908)
- lacernata (Thomas and Wroughton, 1909)
- raviana (Lyon, 1911)
- pemangilis (Lyon, 1911)
- wilkinsoni (Robinson and Kloss, 1911)
- penangensis (Robinson and Kloss, 1911)
- longicauda (Kloss, 1911)
- obscura (Kloss, 1911)
- longicanda (Lyon, 1913)
- anambae (Lyon, 1913)
- redacta (Robinson, 1916)
- jacki (Robinson and Kloss, 1918)
- phoeniura (Thomas, 1923)
- siberu (Chasen and Kloss, 1928)
- cognate (Chasen, 1940)
- umbratilis (Chasen, 1940)

== Threats ==
Common treeshrews are threatened due to deforestation and ensuing human activities in agriculture (for example, using trenchers to dig ditches), plantations, and commercial logging. Moreover, other pressures, such as hunting for food and sport, can create pressure to the species.

== As a model organism ==
Tupaia glis is used by researchers as animal models for human diseases because of their close relationship to primates, and their well-developed senses of vision and hearing. Research studies have included hepatitis. Another instance has been documented where an individual of Tupaia glis developed breast cancer.
