= Alfred Duvaucel =

French naturalist and explorer

Alfred Duvaucel (French pronunciation: [alfʁɛd dyvosɛl]; 4 February 1793, Bièvres, Essonne – 1824, Madras, India) was a French naturalist and explorer. He was the stepson of Georges Cuvier and travelled in India and Southeast Asia as a collector of specimens for the Museum of Natural History in Paris.

== Early life and voyages ==
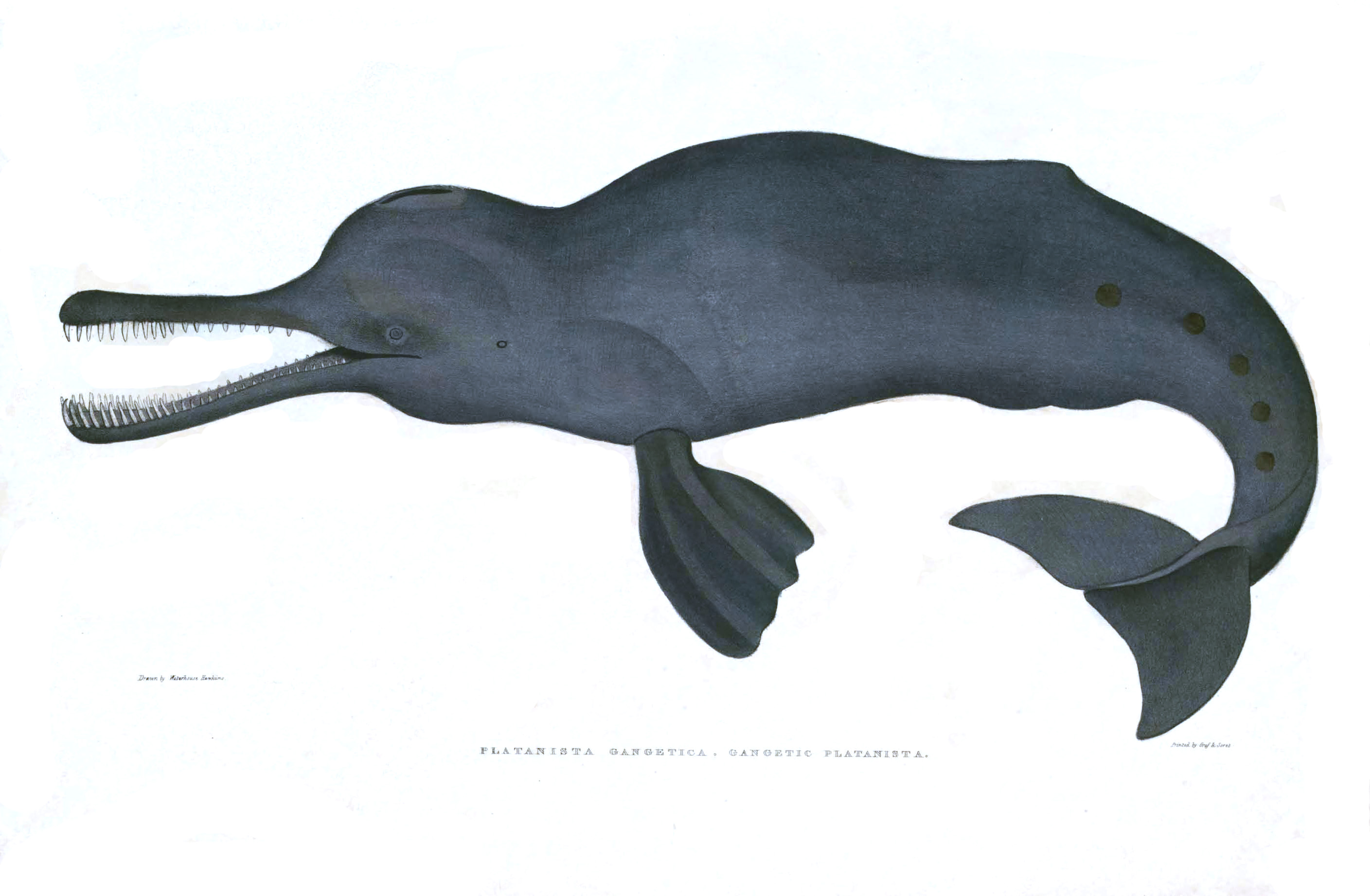
Drawing of Ganges river dolphin by Benjamin Waterhouse Hawkins, 1832

Duvaucel was born in Bièvres just outside Paris to nobleman Louis Philippe Alexandre Du Vaucel, Marquis de Castelnau (1749–1794) and Anne Marie Sophie Coquet du Trazail (1764–1849). His father was a revenue collector for the king and was guillotined during the French Revolution in 1794. Two years later his mother married Georges Cuvier who adopted her children Alfred, Thélème (1788–1809), Antoinette Sophie Laure (1789–1867) and Martial (1794–1871), and instilled an interest in natural history in them. He was the youngest and he was closest to his sister Sophie, with Alfred and Martial dying young. Three of the children of Cuvier died in infancy. Duvaucel served briefly in military service in 1813, posted to Antwerp in 1814 as aide-de-camp to General Lazare Carnot, and resigned from it. In 1817 he was appointed as a naturalist to the King (Naturaliste du Roi). In December 1817, Duvaucel left Le Havre, France aboard the Seine under Captain Houssard for British India and arrived in Calcutta in May 1818, where he met Pierre-Médard Diard. Together, they moved to Chandernagore, then a trading post of the French East India Company, and started collecting animals and plants for the Paris Museum of Natural History. In their letters Diard and Duvaucel note the difficulties in employing Indians for work due to the restrictions of the caste system. The finally managed to get their cook to hunt, the gatekeeper to care for the garden, and for the server to catch fish for them. They employed hunters who supplied them daily with live and dead specimens, which they described, drew and classified. They also received objects from local rajahs and went hunting themselves. In the garden of their compound, they cultivated local plants and kept water birds in a basin. In June 1818, they sent their first consignment to Paris, containing a skeleton of a Ganges river dolphin, a head of a "Tibetan ox", various species of little-known birds, some mineral samples and a drawing of a tapir from Sumatra that they had studied in Hastings' menagerie. Later consignments included a live Cashmere goat, crested pheasants and various birds.

In December 1818, Thomas Stamford Raffles invited them to accompany him on his journeys and pursue their collections in places where he would have to go officially. He offered to establish a menagerie in his Bencoulen residence. By end of December, they left with him on the basis they would equally share the collected animals. In Pulo-Pinang, they collected two new fish species and some birds. In Achem, they collected only a few plants, insects, birds, snakes, fish and two deer. In Malacca, they bought a bear, an argus and some other birds. In Singapore, they obtained a dugong, of which they prepared drawings and a description that Raffles sent to the Royal Society. These were published in 1820 by Everard Home and planned for publication in the Histoire naturelle des mammifères by Étienne Geoffroy Saint-Hilaire and Frédéric Cuvier. After their arrival at Bencoulen in August 1819, Raffles requisitioned most of their collection and left them copies of their drawings, descriptions and notes. Duvaucel and Diard took leave, sent their share to Calcutta and parted.

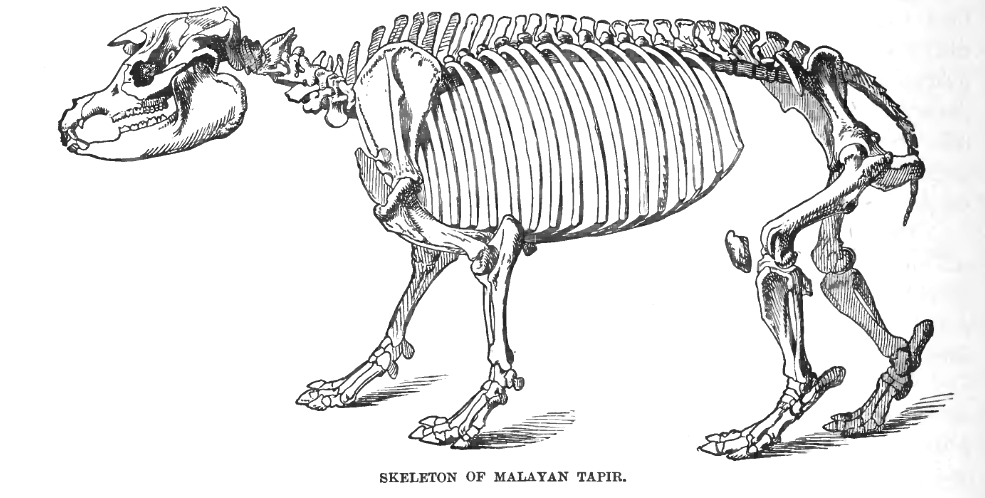
Drawing of a skeleton of a Malayan tapir by Richard Lydekker, 1890s

Duvaucel set off to Padang, and collected specimens of the Malayan tapir, Sumatran rhinoceros, several monkeys, reptiles, deer and chital in this area. He returned to Calcutta with several cases of stuffed animals, skeletons, skins and some live monkeys. He returned to Chandernagore, from where he made several excursions. In July 1821, he embarked on the Hooghly River, visited the cities of Hooghly and Guptipara, and moved on across the Ganges to Dacca. From there, he travelled to Sylhet and explored the Cossy and Gentya hills north of Sylhet with permission of a Khasi king. He returned to Calcutta in December with a rich zoological collection, but since then he suffered from the jungle fever. He intended to set off to Tibet in September 1822. But due to political circumstances, he had to restrict his excursions to the territories of Benares in Bengal, and Kathmandu in "Nepaul". There is no record however that he ever travelled to Nepal. The editor of the Journal of the Asiatic Society of Bengal noted in 1836 that two of Duvaucel's collectors lived for a year with Brian Houghton Hodgson in Kathmandu.

== Death ==
Duvaucel died in August 1824 in Madras, but his obituary was not published until April 1825. Ten years later, rumours were afloat in France that he was mauled by a tiger within minutes. According to letters that Duvaucel wrote to Jean-Jacques Coulmann (1796–1870), the actual cause is now known to have been an attack by an Indian rhinoceros. On 24 January 1823 he was in a place near Rajmahal at "Sielygalli" (Sakrigali) where he was shooting a rhinoceros when another individual attacked him. He was left with a wound in the thigh and unable to walk. His assistants transported him on oxcart to Sakrigali from where he went to Bhagalpur 50 km away. He was treated by a Scottish surgeon and then he travelled to Calcutta. He then moved to Madras where he died from weakness and dysentery.

== Publications ==
In February 1820, the Asiatick Society (Calcutta, India) published an article jointly written by Duvaucel and Diard entitled "Sur une nouvelle espèce de Sorex — Sorex Glis" including a drawing of a common treeshrew.

In spring 1822, the Asiatick Society published his article "On the Black Deer of Bengal" including a drawing of a deer species that he had observed in Bengal, Sumatra, and in the mountains north of Sylhet.

== Legacy ==
The Paris Museum of Natural History received nearly 2000 animals collected jointly by Duvaucel and Diard during their stay of more than a year in the Greater Sunda Islands. Their consignments comprised 88 mammal species, 630 bird species, 59 reptile species and contained stuffed animals, skins, skeletons, drawings and descriptions of such notable species as the Malayan tapir, Sumatran rhinoceros, Javan rhinoceros, gibbons, leaf monkeys, two previously unknown fruit bat species, tree shrews, skunks, binturong and sun bear. Several of these species were first described by French zoologists working at the museum. Anselme Gaëtan Desmarest described the Malayan tapir in 1819; the Sunda stink badger and Paradoxurus hermaphroditus bondar, a subspecies of the Asian palm civet in 1820; the Sunda pangolin, the Malayan weasel and the genus of Semnopithecus in 1822.

In 1821, Raffles published descriptions of the species jointly collected by Duvaucel and Diard in Sumatra, including first descriptions of the sun bear, the binturong, the crab-eating macaque, the Sumatran surili, the siamang gibbon, the silvery lutung, the large bamboo rat, the large treeshrew and the cream-coloured giant squirrel.

The many drawings, skeletons, skins and other animal parts that Duvaucel sent to the Paris Museum of Natural History included head, skin and paws of a species from the mountains north of India that his stepfather's brother Frédéric Cuvier described as Ailurus fulgens in 1825.

Alfred Duvaucel is commemorated in the scientific names of a number of species:

- the barasingha Cervus duvaucelii — described by his stepfather Georges Cuvier in 1823;
- the scarlet-rumped trogon Harpactes duvaucelii — described by Coenraad Jacob Temminck in 1824;
- the river lapwing Vanellus duvaucelii — described by Rene Primevere Lesson in 1826;
- the Himalayan goral Naemorhedus duvaucelii — described by Charles Hamilton Smith in 1827 is synonymous to Naemorhedus goral described in 1825 by Thomas Hardwicke;
- the Pachysoma duvaucelii, a subspecies of the lesser short-nosed fruit bat — described by Isidore Geoffroy Saint-Hilaire in 1828;
- the moth Psichotoe duvaucelii — described by Jean Baptiste Boisduval in 1829;
- Duvaucel's barbet Megalaima australis duvaucelii — first described as Bucco duvauceli by René Primevère Lesson in 1831 as living in Sumatra; relegated a subspecies of Xantholæma duvaucelii described by Thomas Horsfield and Frederic Moore in 1856 as inhabiting the Malayan Peninsula and Sumatra; latter was renamed Megalaima duvaucelii by Frederic Moore in 1859 and subordinated to Mesobucco duvauceli by George Ernest Shelley in 1891; the bird is now a valid subspecies of the blue-eared barbet;
- Duvaucel's cuckoo Bubutus duvaucelii — described by Lesson in 1831 as living in Sumatra; subordinated to the genus Rhinortha by Shelley in 1891 as a type of Raffles's malkoha;
- the Indian squid Loligo duvaucelii — described by Alcide d'Orbigny in 1835 is a synonym of Uroteuthis duvauceli;
- Duvaucel's gecko Hoplodactylus duvaucelii — described by André Marie Constant Duméril and Gabriel Bibron in 1836;
- the Indian bee species Macrocera duvaucelii — described by Amédée Louis Michel Lepeletier in 1842 is synonymous to Tetralonia duvaucelii;
- the freshwater fish Rohita duvaucelii — described by Achille Valenciennes in 1842 is a junior synonym of Osteobrama vigorsii endemic to India;
- the olive barb Barbus duvaucelii — described by Valenciennes in 1842 is a junior synonym of Puntius sarana;
- the pool barb Leuciscus duvaucelii — described by Valenciennes in 1844 is a junior synonym of Puntius sophore;
- the nase Chondrostoma duvaucelii found near Madras — first described by Valenciennes in 1844;
- Felis Duvaucelli — described by Brian Houghton Hodgson in 1852, was renamed Felis charltoni by Thomas Horsfield in 1856; and classified a subspecies of Pardofelis marmorata by Reginald Innes Pocock in 1932;
- Cyanops duvauceli robinsoni — named by Edward Charles Stuart Baker in 1918 as inhabiting the Malay Peninsula, Thailand and Myanmar, is another name for the blue-eared barbet.
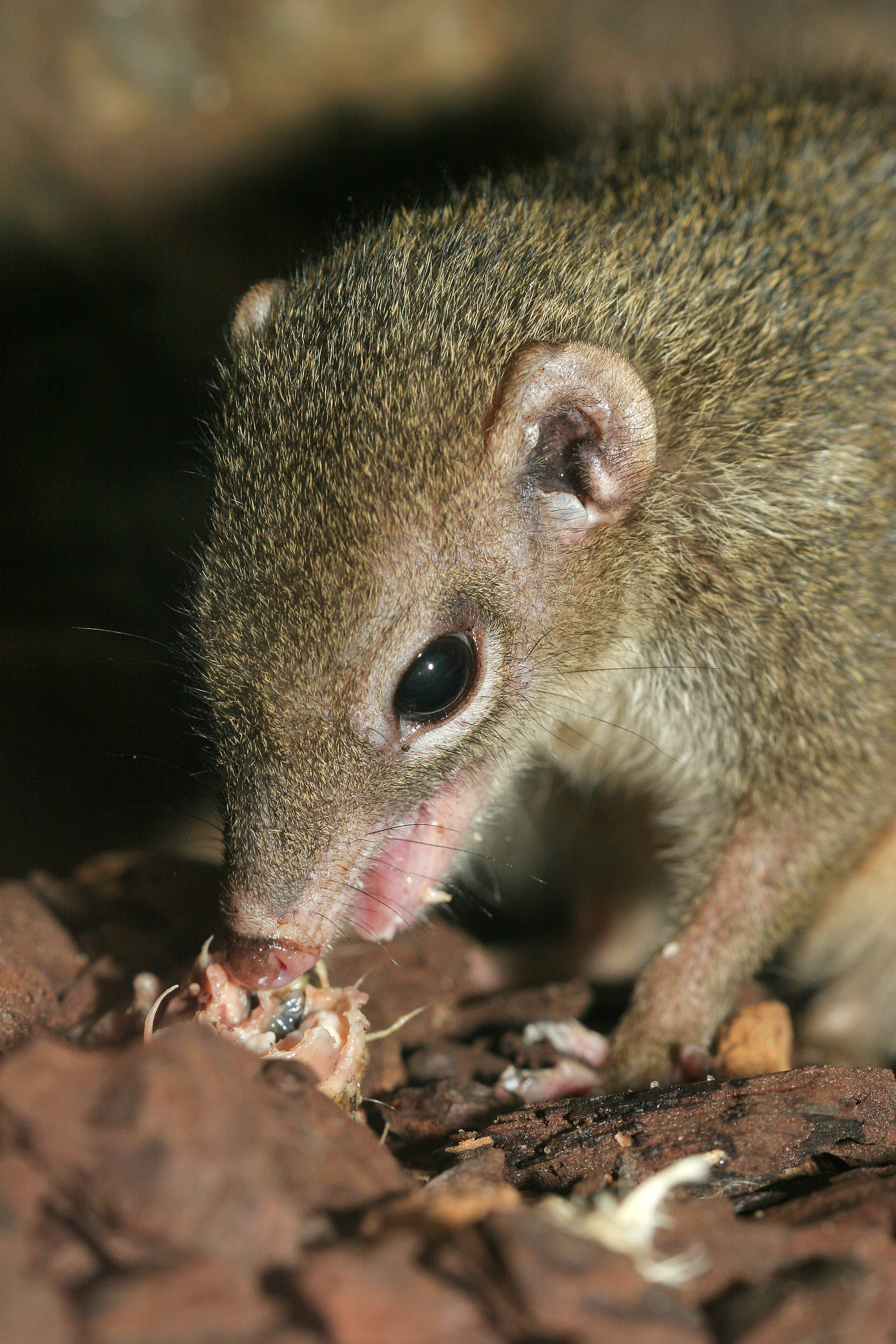
Tupaia glis

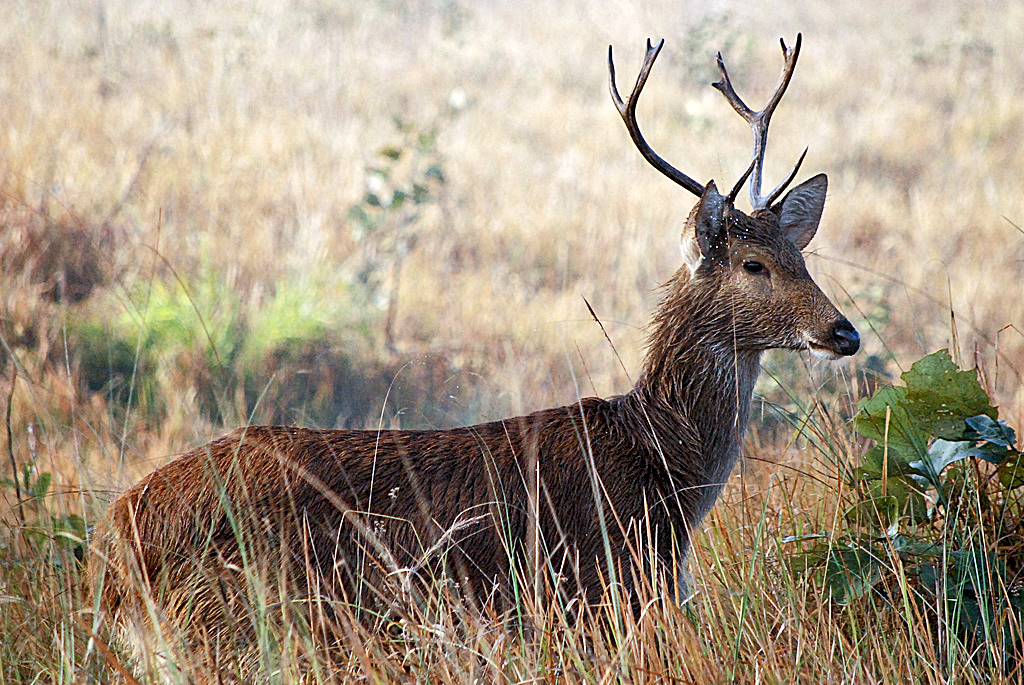
Cervus duvaucelii

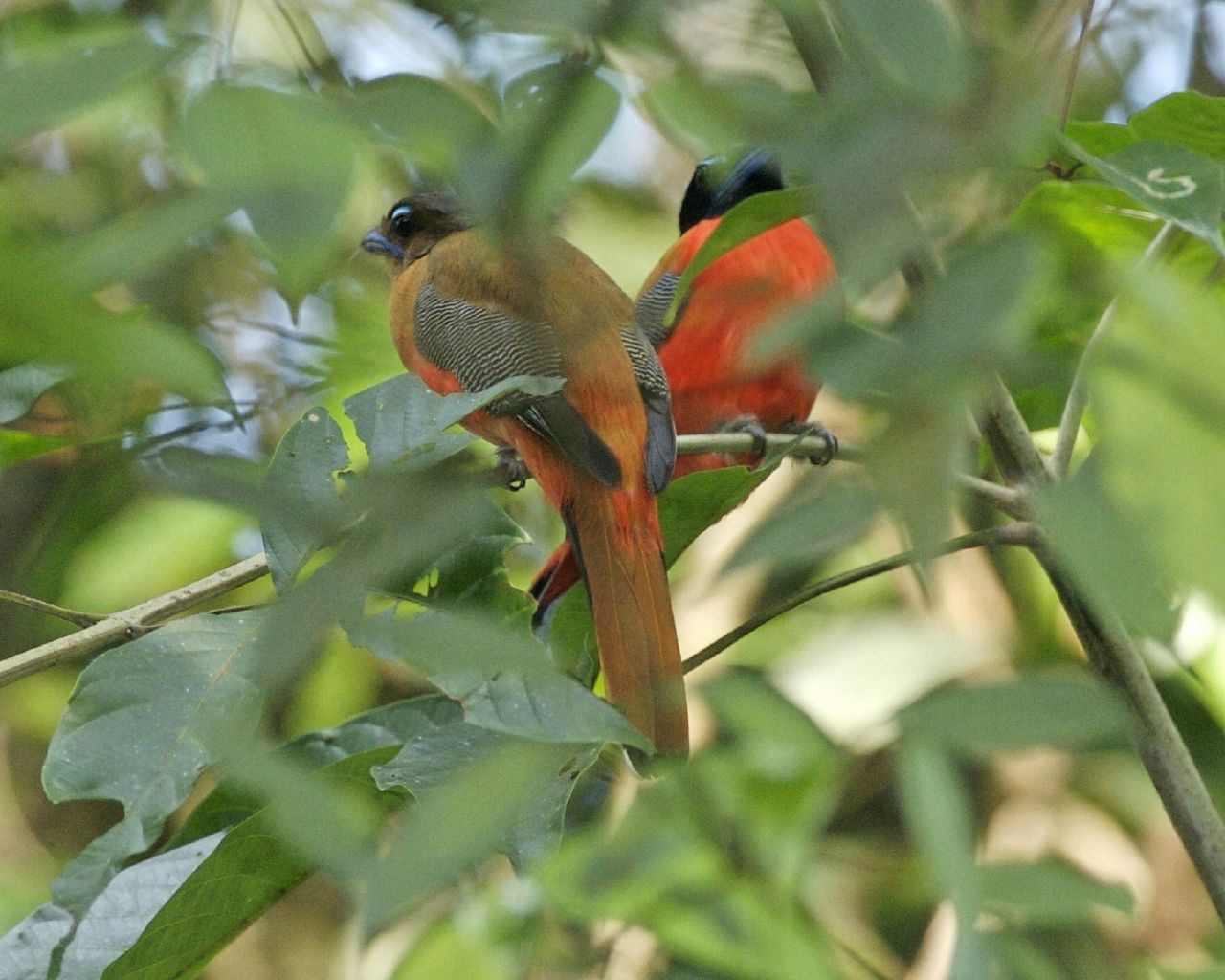
Harpactes duvaucelii

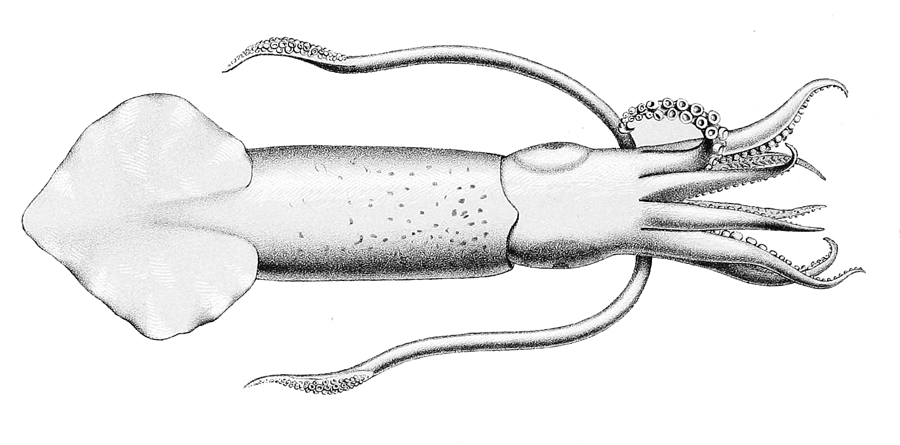
Drawing of Uroteuthis duvauceli

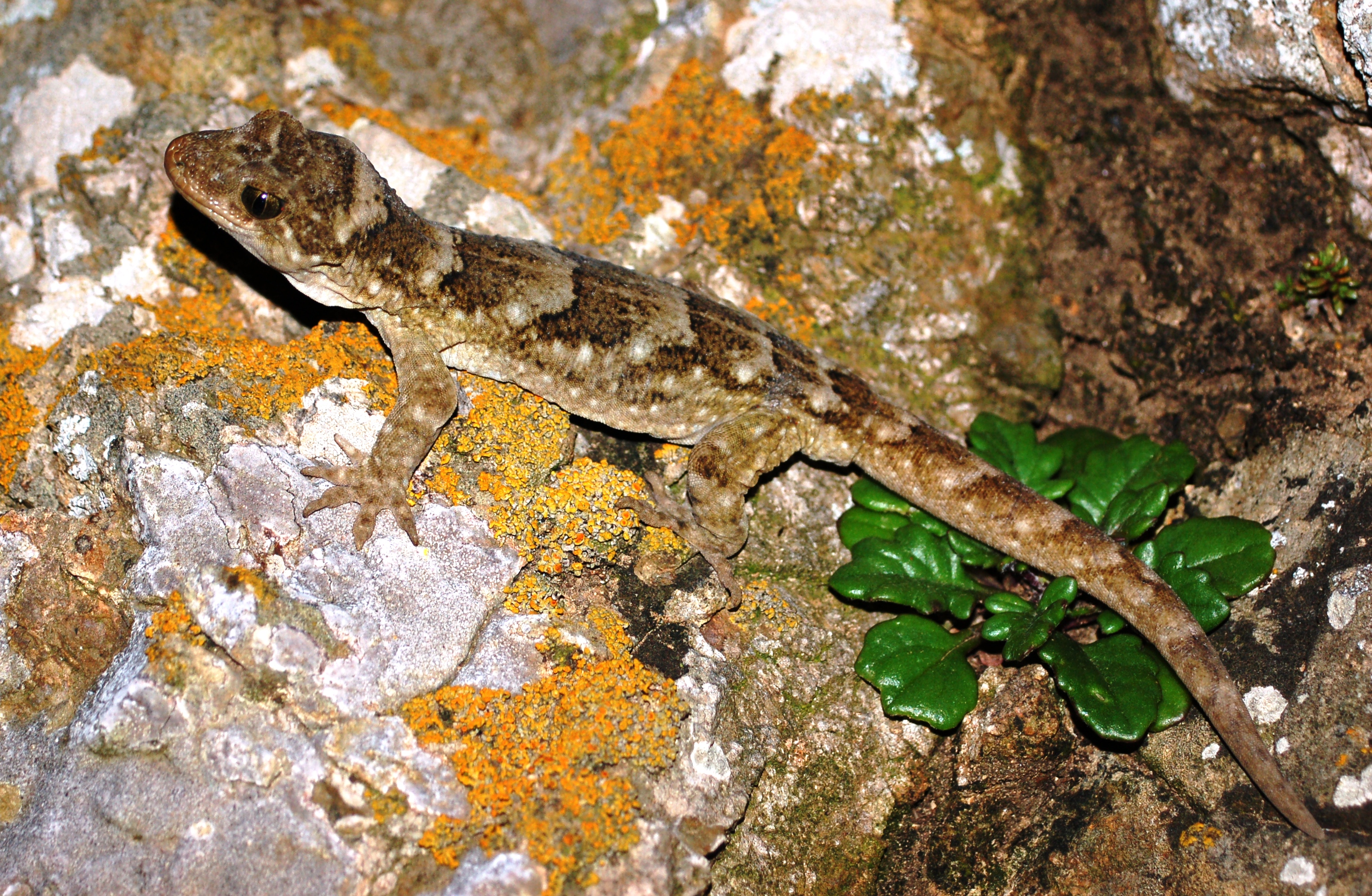
Hoplodactylus duvaucelii
