= Psichotoe cingulata =

Scientific classification
- Domain: Eukaryota
- Kingdom: Animalia
- Phylum: Arthropoda
- Class: Insecta
- Order: Lepidoptera
- Superfamily: Noctuoidea
- Family: Erebidae
- Subfamily: Arctiinae
- Genus: Psichotoe
- Species: P. cingulata

Binomial name
- Psichotoe cingulata Kiriakoff, 1963

Species of moth

Psichotoe cingulata is a moth in the subfamily Arctiinae. It was described by Sergius G. Kiriakoff in 1963. It is found in Guinea.
