= Psichotoe =

Scientific classification
- Domain: Eukaryota
- Kingdom: Animalia
- Phylum: Arthropoda
- Class: Insecta
- Order: Lepidoptera
- Superfamily: Noctuoidea
- Family: Erebidae
- Subfamily: Arctiinae
- Genus: Psichotoe; Boisduval, 1829

Genus of moths

Psichotoe is a genus of moths in the subfamily Arctiinae.

== Species ==
- Psichotoe cingulata Kiriakoff, 1963
- Psichotoe duvaucelii Boisduval, 1829
- Psichotoe rubridorsata Berio, 1941

== Former species ==
- Psichotoe gnatula Boisduval, 1847
