= Sophie Duvaucel =

French woman of letters and artist

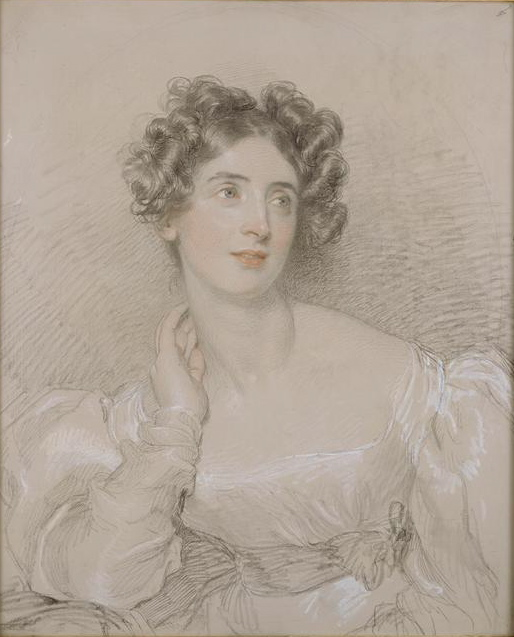
Portrait c. 1832 by Sir Thomas Lawrence in the Louvre

Antoinette Sophie Laure Lainé du Vaucel (19 December 1789 – 18 November 1867) was a French woman of letters and an artist. She assisted her step-father Georges Cuvier with his natural history researches and public talks.

Sophie was the daughter of Louis Philippe Alexandre Du Vaucel, Marquis de Castelnau (1749-1794) and Anne Marie Sophie Coquet du Trazail (1764-1849). Her father collected taxes for the French king and was guillotined in 1794 during the French Revolution. Two years later, her mother married Georges Cuvier, who adopted Sophie and the other three children including the naturalist Alfred Duvaucel. Sophie was brought up in a free-thinking Catholic family and at the age of 14 she went to her step-father's home in the Jardin des Plantes. She studied music and drawing like others of her class in the period as well as joined the social conversations of the family. She also met the literati at her step-father's saturday salons. Among the family visitors she met the English lawyer Sutton Sharpe (1797-1843) who courted Sophie. She also corresponded with the French writer "Stendhal" who likely used Sophie as the model of his character Mathilde de la Mole in his 1830 novel The Red and the Black. She also accompanied her step-father during his public lectures and acted as his secretary. She also assisted him in arranging the natural history collections, preparing plaster casts of fossils, and making illustrations. She illustrated for Cuvier's Histoire naturelle des poissons. Sophie's knowledge of English also made her the natural companion during Cuvier's visits to England and they met William Buckland in Oxford and William Elford Leach in London. She was engaged briefly to Sutton Sharpe but broke off the engagement. Cuvier died during a cholera epidemic in Paris in February 1832. The next year she married the widower Admiral Ducrest de Villeneuve, adopting three of his children. Sophie would frequently visit her mother in Paris until her death from influenza in 1849. Sophie assisted Stendhal in meeting important connections including Countess Abrizzi.
