= Psichotoe rubridorsata =

Scientific classification
- Domain: Eukaryota
- Kingdom: Animalia
- Phylum: Arthropoda
- Class: Insecta
- Order: Lepidoptera
- Superfamily: Noctuoidea
- Family: Erebidae
- Subfamily: Arctiinae
- Genus: Psichotoe
- Species: P. rubridorsata

Binomial name
- Psichotoe rubridorsata Berio, 1941

Species of moth

Psichotoe rubridorsata is a moth in the subfamily Arctiinae. It was described by Emilio Berio in 1941 and is found in Uganda.
