= Psichotoe duvaucelii =

Scientific classification
- Kingdom: Animalia
- Phylum: Arthropoda
- Clade: Pancrustacea
- Class: Insecta
- Order: Lepidoptera
- Superfamily: Noctuoidea
- Family: Erebidae
- Subfamily: Arctiinae
- Genus: Psichotoe
- Species: P. duvaucelii

Binomial name
- Psichotoe duvaucelii Boisduval, 1829

Synonyms
- Psychotoe duvauceli

Species of moth

Psichotoe duvaucelii is a moth in the subfamily Arctiinae. It was described by Jean Baptiste Boisduval in 1829. It is found in India (Karachi, Calcutta, Assam) and Myanmar.
