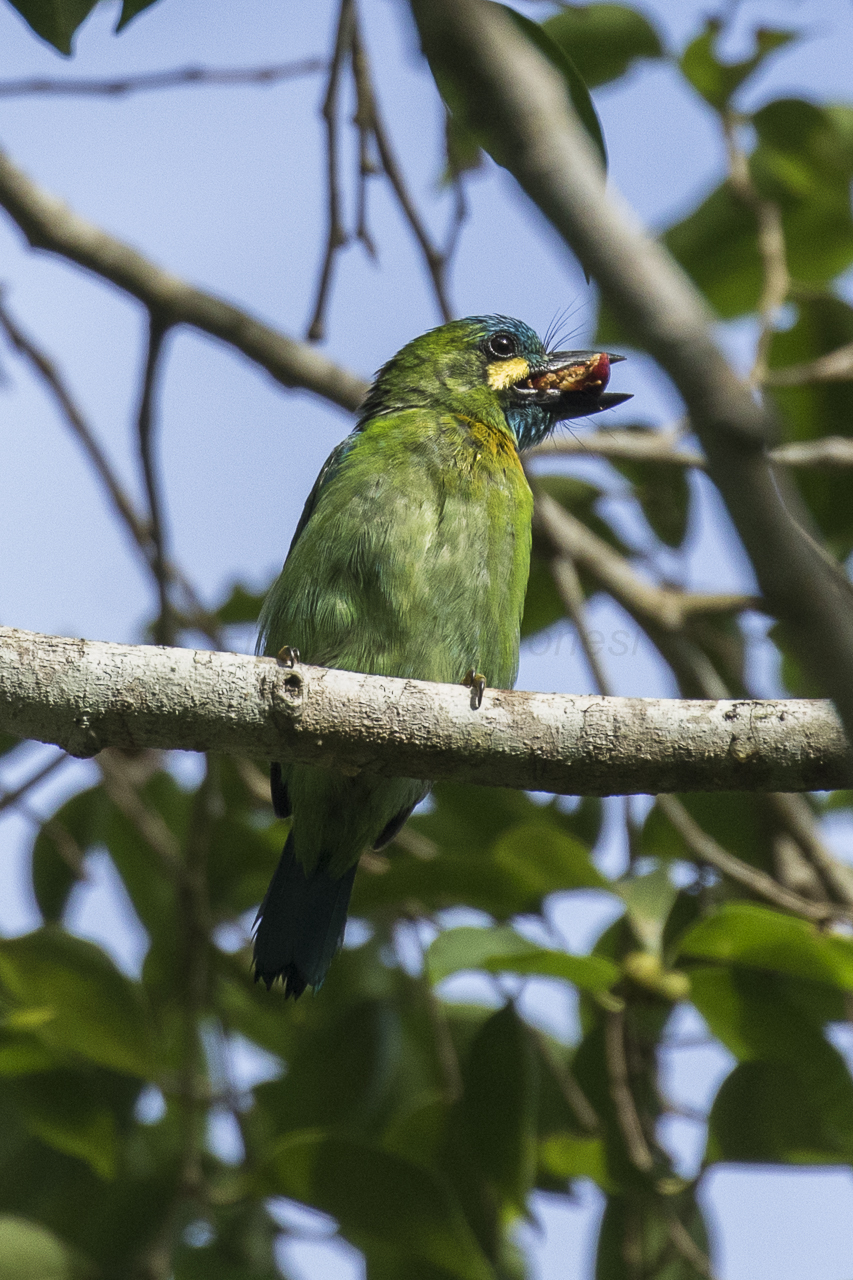

Conservation status
- Least Concern (IUCN 3.1)

Scientific classification
- Kingdom: Animalia
- Phylum: Chordata
- Class: Aves
- Order: Piciformes
- Family: Megalaimidae
- Genus: Psilopogon
- Species: P. australis

Binomial name
- Psilopogon australis (Horsfield, 1821)

= Yellow-eared barbet =

Species of bird

The yellow-eared barbet (Psilopogon australis) is an Asian barbet native to Java and Bali. It inhabits shrubland and forest up to an altitude of 2,000 m (6,600 ft).

Bucco australis was the scientific name proposed by Thomas Horsfield in 1821 who described a barbet from Java with yellow cheeks and breast.
