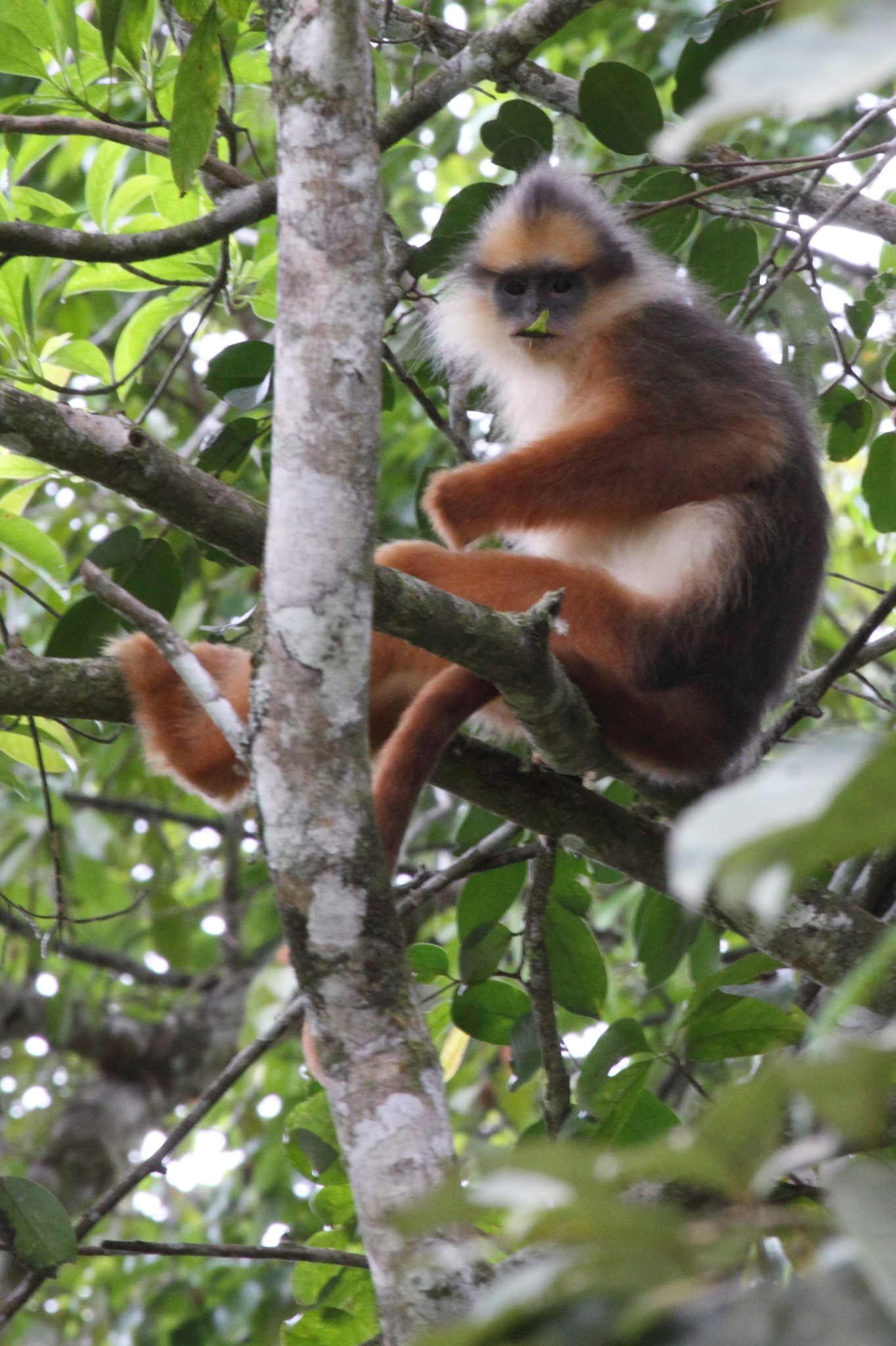

Conservation status
- Endangered (IUCN 3.1)

Scientific classification
- Kingdom: Animalia
- Phylum: Chordata
- Class: Mammalia
- Infraclass: Placentalia
- Order: Primates
- Family: Cercopithecidae
- Genus: Presbytis
- Species: P. melalophos

Binomial name
- Presbytis melalophos (Raffles, 1821)
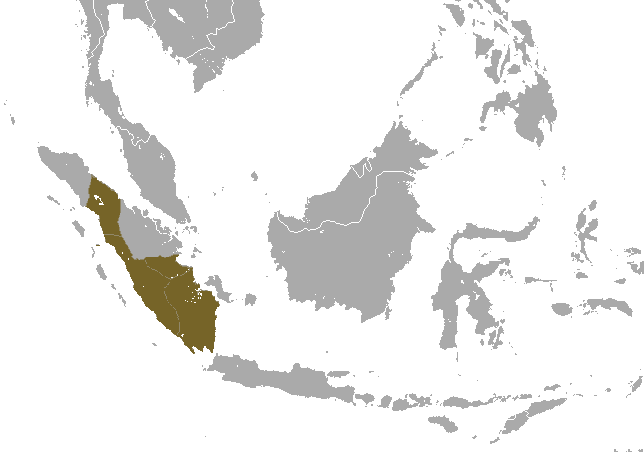
- Combined range black-crested Sumatran langur, black Sumatran langur, black-and-white langur and mitered langur

= Black-crested Sumatran langur =

Species of Old World monkey

The black-crested Sumatran langur (Presbytis melalophos) is a species of primate in the family Cercopithecidae. It is endemic to Sumatra in Indonesia. Its natural habitat is subtropical or tropical dry forests. It is threatened by habitat loss.

The black Sumatran langur, black-and-white langur, Sarawak surili, Raffles' banded langur and mitered langur were formerly considered subspecies of P. melalophos.

== Habitat ==
The black-crested Sumatran langur is a forest dwelling animal. It is native to Sumatra and several neighboring islands. From 2000 to 2012, it lost an estimated 62% of its forest habitat.

== Diet ==
The black-crested Sumatran langur is frugivorous and folivorous. With fruit making up 50 to 60 percent of its diet, the rest consists of leaves and occasionally seeds and flowers. Its foregut is enlarged and has the capacity for microbial fermentation. The black-crested Sumatran langur feeds from about 200 different species of trees. It prefers new leaves to mature leaves.

== Predation ==
The main predators of black-crested Sumatran langurs include snakes in the genus Python and birds of prey, including crested serpent eagles.
