= Georges Cuvier =

French paleontologist (1769–1832)

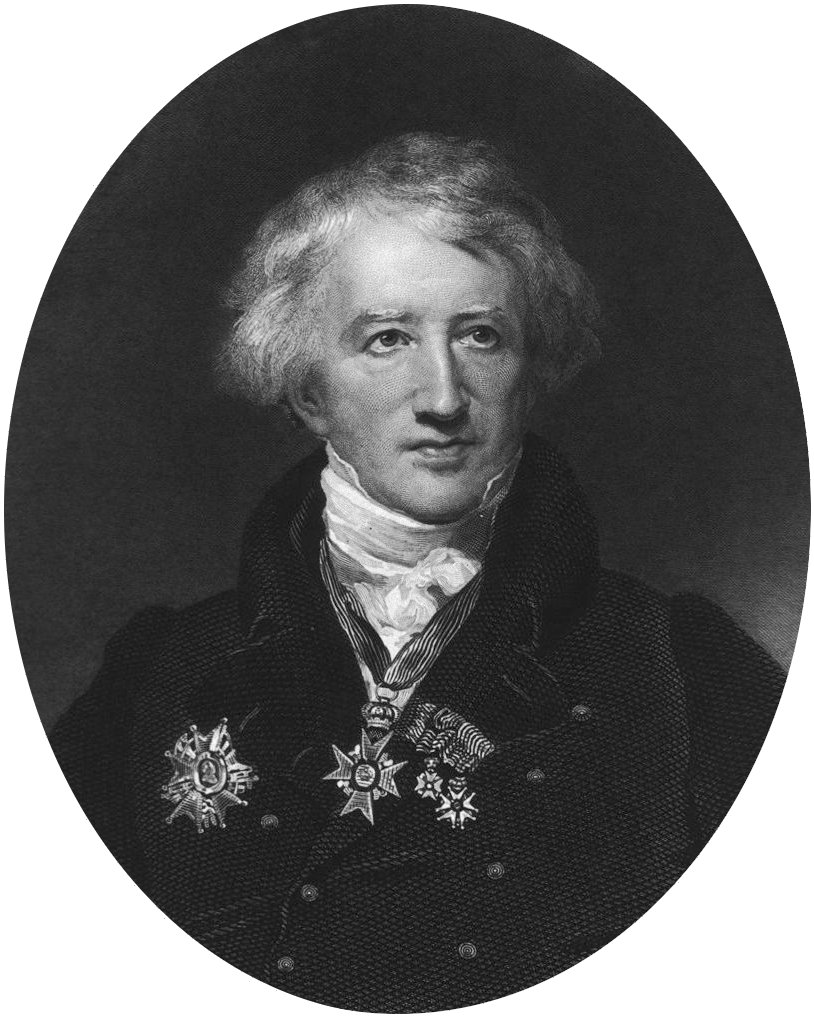
- Born: Jean Léopold Nicolas Frédéric Cuvier; 23 August 1769; Montbéliard, Holy Roman Empire
- Died: 13 May 1832 (aged 62); Paris, France
- Known for: Le Règne Animal; establishing the fields of stratigraphy and comparative anatomy, and the principle of faunal succession in the fossil record; making extinction an accepted scientific phenomenon; opposing theories of evolution; popularizing catastrophism
- Scientific career
- Fields: Natural history, paleontology, anatomy
- Workplaces: Muséum national d'histoire naturelle, Collège de France
- Academic advisors: Carl Friedrich Kielmeyer
- Notable students: Louis Agassiz; Henri Marie Ducrotay de Blainville; Pierre Flourens; Henri Milne-Edwards; Johann Baptist von Spix
- Author abbrev. (botany): Cuvier
- Author abbrev. (zoology): Cuvier

Jean Léopold Nicolas Frédéric, baron Cuvier (23 August 1769 – 13 May 1832), known as Georges Cuvier (/ˈkjuːvieɪ/; French: [ʒɔʁʒ(ə) kyvje]), was a French naturalist and zoologist, sometimes referred to as the "founding father of paleontology". Cuvier was a major figure in natural sciences research in the early 19th century and was instrumental in establishing the fields of comparative anatomy and paleontology through his work in comparing living animals with fossils.

Cuvier's work is considered the foundation of vertebrate paleontology, and he expanded Linnaean taxonomy by grouping classes into phyla and incorporating both fossils and living species into the classification. Cuvier is also known for establishing extinction as a scientific fact—at the time, extinction was considered by many of Cuvier's contemporaries to be merely controversial speculation. In his Essay on the Theory of the Earth (1813), Cuvier proposed that now-extinct species had been wiped out by periodic catastrophic flooding events. In this way, Cuvier became the most influential proponent of catastrophism in geology in the early 19th century. His study of the strata of the Paris basin with Alexandre Brongniart established the basic principles of biostratigraphy.

Among his other accomplishments, Cuvier established that elephant-like bones found in North America belonged to an extinct animal he later would name a "mastodon", and that a large skeleton dug up in present-day Argentina was of a giant, prehistoric ground sloth, which he named Megatherium. He also established two ungulate genera from the Paris Basin named Palaeotherium and Anoplotherium based on fragmentary remains alone, although more complete remains were later uncovered. He named the pterosaur Pterodactylus and described (but did not discover or name) the aquatic reptile Mosasaurus.

Cuvier is also remembered for strongly opposing theories of evolution, which at the time (before Darwin's theory) were mainly proposed by Jean-Baptiste de Lamarck and Geoffroy Saint-Hilaire. Cuvier believed there was no evidence for evolution but rather evidence for cyclical creations and destructions of life forms by global extinction events such as deluges. In 1830, Cuvier and Geoffroy engaged in a famous debate, which is said to exemplify the two major deviations in biological thinking at the time – whether animal structure was due to function or (evolutionary) morphology. Cuvier supported function and rejected Lamarck's thinking.

Cuvier also conducted racial studies which provided part of the foundation for scientific racism, and published work on the supposed differences between racial groups' physical properties and mental abilities. Cuvier subjected Sarah Baartman to examinations alongside other French naturalists during a period in which she was held captive in a state of neglect. Cuvier examined Baartman shortly before her death, and conducted a dissection following her death that disparagingly compared her physical features to those of monkeys.

His most famous work among the general public was the Preliminary Discourse of the Recherches sur les ossemens fossiles de 1812, which was published as a separate in 1821 and in book form in 1825, with the title Discours sur les révolutions de la surface du Globe. The evolution of his ideas on Comparative Anatomy, Paleontology, and pre-Darwinian Natural History can be seen by comparing these works in the form of a Variorum. Another important work was Le Règne Animal (1817; English: The Animal Kingdom). In 1819, he was created a peer for life in honour of his scientific contributions. Thereafter, he was known as Baron Cuvier. He died in Paris during an epidemic of cholera. Some of Cuvier's most influential followers were Louis Agassiz on the continent and in the United States, and Richard Owen in Britain. His name is one of the 72 names inscribed on the Eiffel Tower.

== Biography ==
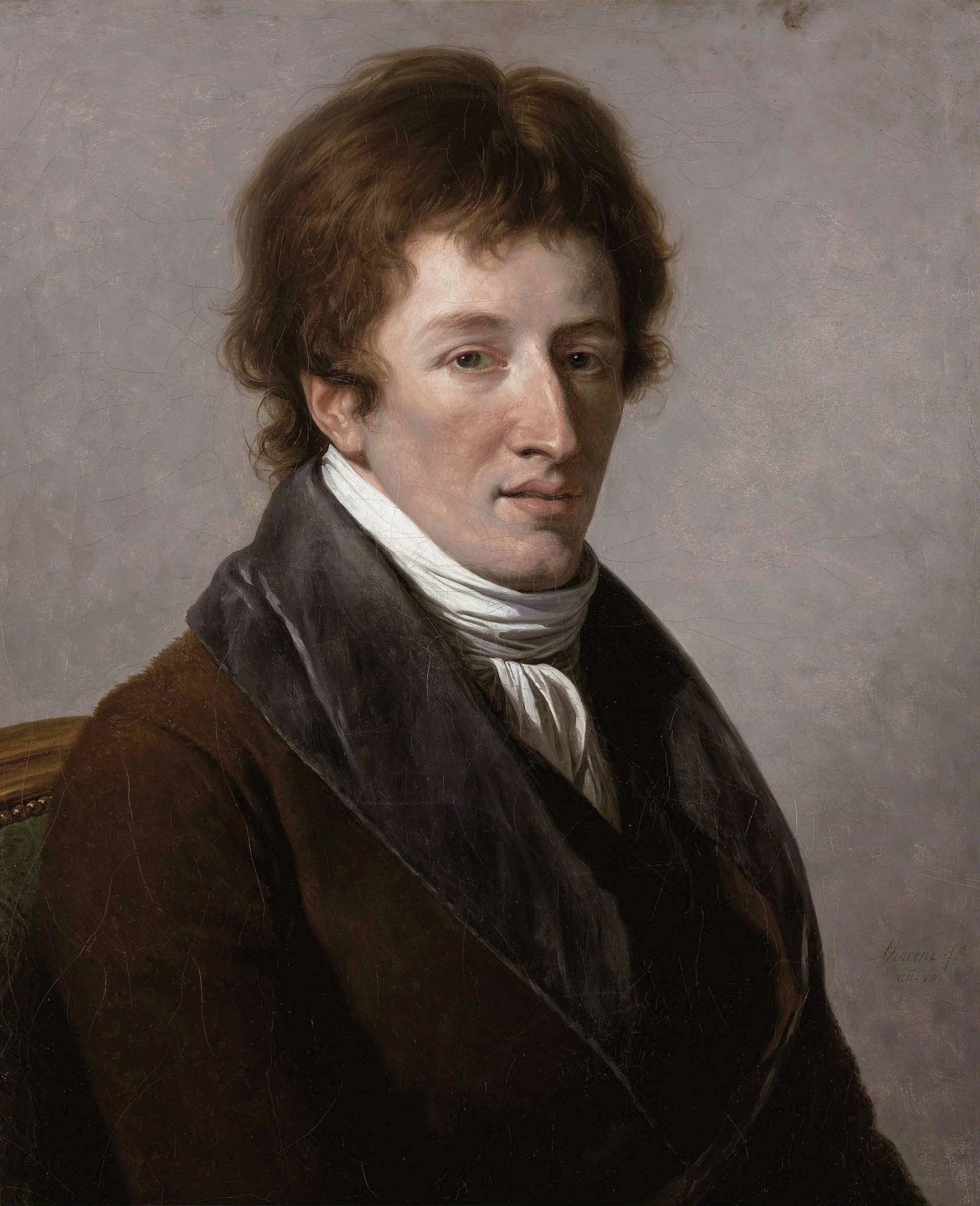
Portrait by François-André Vincent, 1795

Jean Léopold Nicolas Frédéric Cuvier was born in Montbéliard on 23 August 1769. His family had originally come from a village in the Jura that bore the name Cuvier, and had settled in Montbéliard during the Reformation. His mother was Anne Clémence Chatel; his father, Jean-Georges Cuvier, was a lieutenant in the Swiss Guards and a bourgeois of the town of Montbéliard. At the time, the town, which would be annexed to France on 10 October 1793, belonged to the Sovereign County of Montbéliard (in personal union with the Duchy of Württemberg). His mother, who was much younger than his father, tutored him diligently throughout his early years, so he easily surpassed the other children at school. During his gymnasium years, he had little trouble acquiring Latin and Greek, and was always at the head of his class in mathematics, history, and geography. According to Lee, "The history of mankind was, from the earliest period of his life, a subject of the most indefatigable application; and long lists of sovereigns, princes, and the driest chronological facts, once arranged in his memory, were never forgotten."

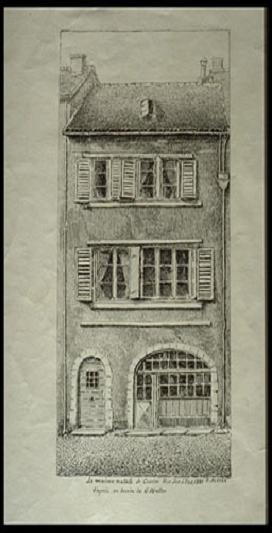
Birthplace of Georges Cuvier in Montbéliard

At the age of 10, soon after entering the gymnasium, he encountered a copy of Conrad Gessner's Historiae Animalium, the work that first sparked his interest in natural history. He then began frequent visits to the home of a relative, where he could borrow volumes of the Comte de Buffon's massive Histoire Naturelle. All of these he read and reread, retaining so much of the information, that by the age of 12, "he was as familiar with quadrupeds and birds as a first-rate naturalist." He remained at the gymnasium for four years.

Cuvier spent an additional four years at the Caroline Academy in Stuttgart, where he excelled in all of his coursework. Although he knew no German on his arrival, after only nine months of study, he managed to win the school prize for that language. Cuvier's German education exposed him to the work of the geologist Abraham Gottlob Werner (1750–1817), whose Neptunism and emphasis on the importance of rigorous, direct observation of three-dimensional, structural relationships of rock formations to geological understanding provided models for Cuvier's scientific theories and methods.

Upon graduation, he had no money on which to live as he awaited an appointment to an academic office. So in July 1788, he took a job at Fiquainville chateau in Normandy as tutor to the only son of the Comte d'Héricy, a Protestant noble. There, during the early 1790s, he began his comparisons of fossils with extant forms. Cuvier regularly attended meetings held at the nearby town of Valmont for the discussion of agricultural topics. There, he became acquainted with Henri Alexandre Tessier (1741–1837), who had assumed a false identity. Previously, he had been a physician and well-known agronomist, who had fled the Terror in Paris. After hearing Tessier speak on agricultural matters, Cuvier recognized him as the author of certain articles on agriculture in the Encyclopédie Méthodique and addressed him as M. Tessier.

Tessier replied in dismay, "I am known, then, and consequently lost."—"Lost!" replied M. Cuvier, "no; you are henceforth the object of our most anxious care." They soon became intimate and Tessier introduced Cuvier to his colleagues in Paris"I have just found a pearl in the dunghill of Normandy", he wrote his friend Antoine-Augustin Parmentier. As a result, Cuvier entered into correspondence with several leading naturalists of the day and was invited to Paris. Arriving in the spring of 1795, at the age of 26, he soon became the assistant of Jean-Claude Mertrud (1728–1802), who had been appointed to the chair of Animal Anatomy at the Jardin des Plantes. When Mertrud died in 1802, Cuvier replaced him in office and the Chair changed its name to Chair of Comparative Anatomy.

The Institut de France was founded in the same year, and he was elected a member of its Academy of Sciences. On 4 April 1796 he began to lecture at the École Centrale du Pantheon and, at the opening of the National Institute in April, he read his first paleontological paper, which subsequently was published in 1800 under the title Mémoires sur les espèces d'éléphants vivants et fossiles. In this paper, he analyzed skeletal remains of Indian and African elephants, as well as mammoth fossils, and a fossil skeleton known at that time as the "Ohio animal". In his second paper in 1796, he described and analyzed a large skeleton found in Paraguay, which he would name Megatherium. He concluded this skeleton represented yet another extinct animal and, by comparing its skull with living species of tree-dwelling sloths, that it was a kind of ground-dwelling giant sloth.

Together, these two 1796 papers were a seminal or landmark event, becoming a turning point in the history of paleontology, and in the development of comparative anatomy, as well. They also greatly enhanced Cuvier's personal reputation and they essentially ended what had been a long-running debate about the reality of extinction.

In 1799, he succeeded Daubenton as professor of natural history in the Collège de France. In 1802, he became titular professor at the Jardin des Plantes; and in the same year, he was appointed commissary of the institute to accompany the inspectors general of public instruction. In this latter capacity, he visited the south of France, but in the early part of 1803, he was chosen permanent secretary of the department of physical sciences of the Academy, and he consequently abandoned the earlier appointment and returned to Paris.

On 2 February 1804, he married Anne Marie Sophie Loquet de Trazay (1768-1849), widow of Louis Philippe Alexandre Duvaucel, Marquis de Castelnau, who had been guillotined in 1794 for being a member of the ferme générale. They had four children, three of whom died in infancy. Their youngest child, Clémentine, died aged 18 in 1827. Cuvier thus outlived all his biological children, but grew close to his stepdaughter Sophie Duvaucel, a highly-accomplished intellectual and artist in her own right, who assisted him in his researches and lectures.

In 1806, he became a foreign member of the Royal Society, and in 1812, a foreign member of the Royal Swedish Academy of Sciences. In 1812, he became a correspondent for the Royal Institute of the Netherlands, and became a member in 1827. Cuvier was elected a Foreign Honorary Member of the American Academy of Arts and Sciences in 1822.

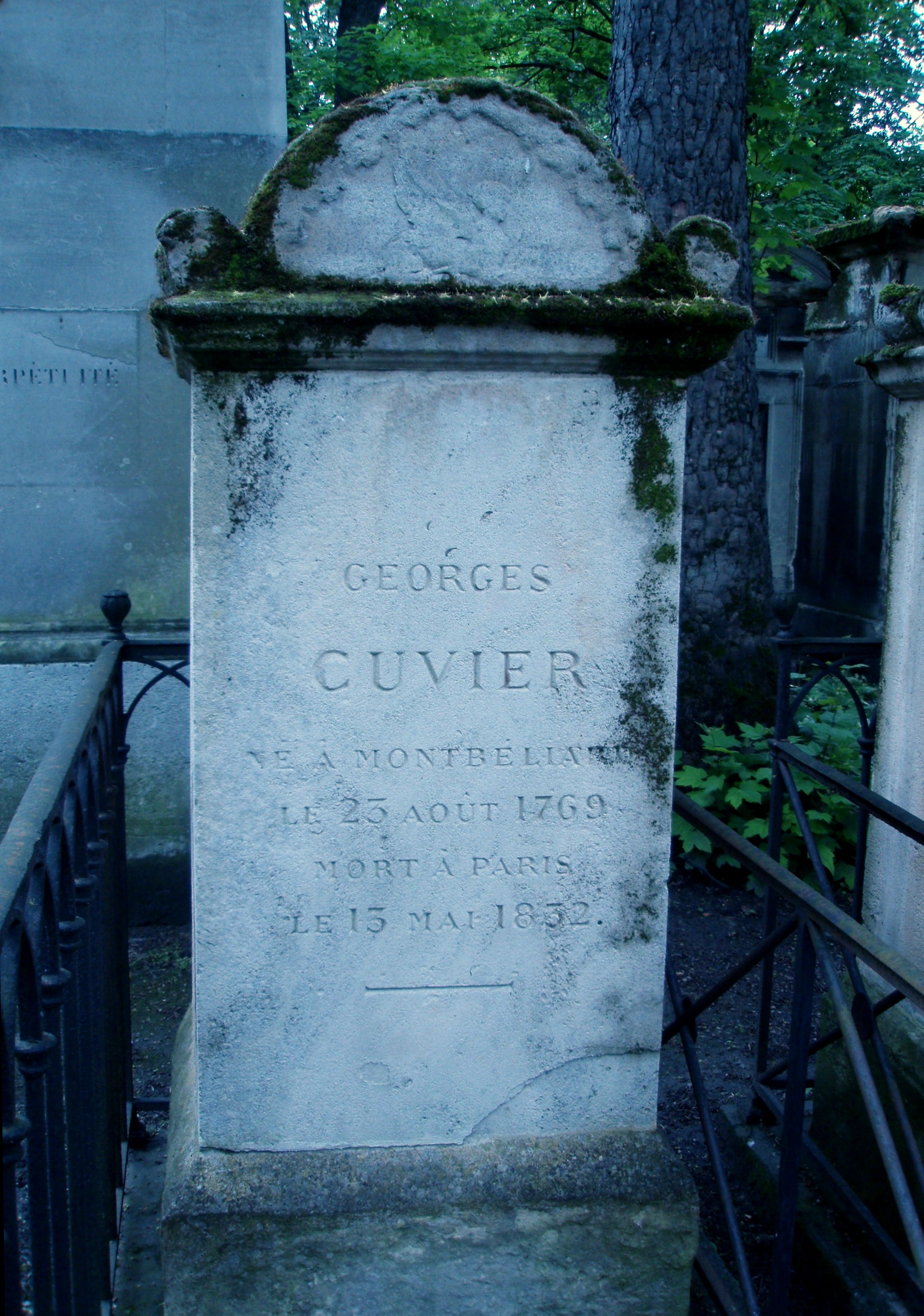
Cuvier's tomb in the Père Lachaise Cemetery, Paris

Cuvier then devoted himself more especially to three lines of inquiry: (i) the structure and classification of the Mollusca; (ii) the comparative anatomy and systematic arrangement of the fishes; (iii) fossil mammals and reptiles and, secondarily, the osteology of living forms belonging to the same groups.

In 1812, Cuvier made what the cryptozoologist Bernard Heuvelmans called his "Rash dictum": he remarked that it was unlikely that any large animal remained undiscovered. Ten years after his death, the word "dinosaur" would be coined by Richard Owen in 1842.

During his lifetime, Cuvier served as an imperial councillor under Napoleon, president of the Council of Public Instruction and chancellor of the university under the restored Bourbons, Grand Officer of the Legion of Honour, a Peer of France, Minister of the Interior, and president of the Council of State under Louis Philippe. He was eminent in all these capacities, and yet the dignity given by such high administrative positions was as nothing compared to his leadership in natural science.

Cuvier was by birth, education, and conviction a devout Lutheran, and remained Protestant throughout his life while regularly attending church services. Despite this, he regarded his personal faith as a private matter; he evidently identified himself with his confessional minority group when he supervised governmental educational programs for Protestants. He also was very active in founding the Parisian Biblical Society in 1818, where he later served as a vice president. From 1822 until his death in 1832, Cuvier was Grand Master of the Protestant Faculties of Theology of the French University.

== Scientific ideas and their impact ==
=== Opposition to evolution ===
Cuvier was critical of theories of evolution, in particular those proposed by his contemporaries Lamarck and Geoffroy Saint-Hilaire, which involved the gradual transmutation of one form into another. He repeatedly emphasized that his extensive experience with fossil material indicated one fossil form does not, as a rule, gradually change into a succeeding, distinct fossil form. A deep-rooted source of his opposition to the gradual transformation of species was his goal of creating an accurate taxonomy based on principles of comparative anatomy. Such a project would become impossible if species were mutable, with no clear boundaries between them. According to the University of California Museum of Paleontology, "Cuvier did not believe in organic evolution, for any change in an organism's anatomy would have rendered it unable to survive. He studied the mummified cats and ibises that Geoffroy had brought back from Napoleon's invasion of Egypt, and showed they were no different from their living counterparts; Cuvier used this to support his claim that life forms did not evolve over time."

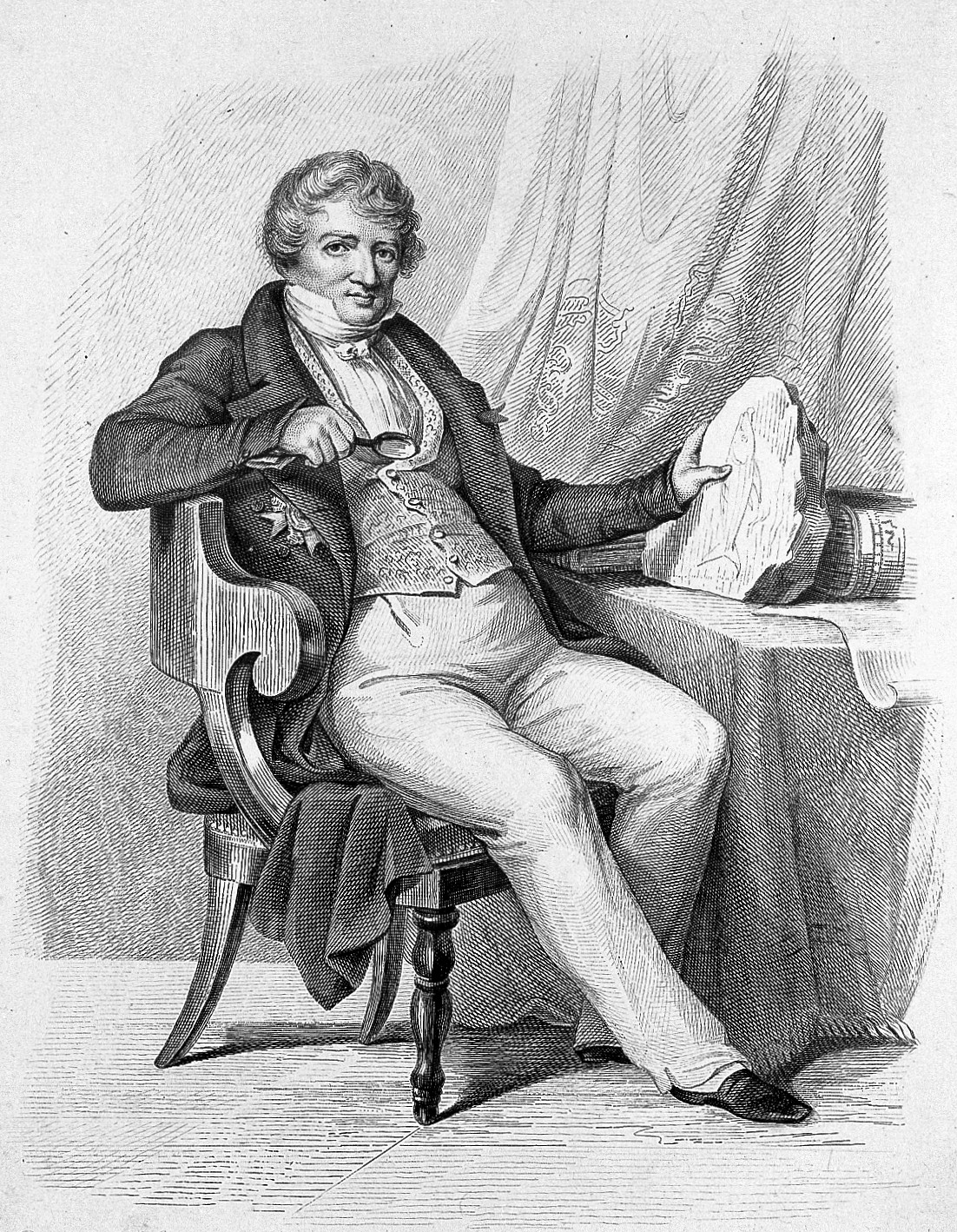
Cuvier with a fish fossil

He also observed that Napoleon's expedition to Egypt had retrieved animals mummified thousands of years previously that seemed no different from their modern counterparts. "Certainly", Cuvier wrote, "one cannot detect any greater difference between these creatures and those we see, than between the human mummies and the skeletons of present-day men."

Lamarck dismissed this conclusion, arguing that evolution happened much too slowly to be observed over just a few thousand years. Cuvier, however, in turn criticized how Lamarck and other naturalists conveniently introduced hundreds of thousands of years "with a stroke of a pen" to uphold their theory. Instead, he argued that one may judge what a long time would produce only by multiplying what a lesser time produces. Since a lesser time produced no organic changes, neither, he argued, would a much longer time. Moreover, his commitment to the principle of the correlation of parts caused him to doubt that any mechanism could ever gradually modify any part of an animal in isolation from all the other parts (in the way Lamarck proposed), without rendering the animal unable to survive.

In his Éloge de M. de Lamarck (Praise for M. de Lamarck), Cuvier wrote that Lamarck's theory of evolution rested on two arbitrary suppositions; the one, that it is the seminal vapour which organizes the embryo; the other, that efforts and desires may engender organs. A system established on such foundations may amuse the imagination of a poet; a metaphysician may derive from it an entirely new series of systems; but it cannot for a moment bear the examination of anyone who has dissected a hand, a viscus, or even a feather.

Instead, he said, the typical form makes an abrupt appearance in the fossil record, and persists unchanged to the time of its extinction. Cuvier attempted to explain this paleontological phenomenon he envisioned (which would be readdressed more than a century later by "punctuated equilibrium") and to harmonize it with the Bible. He attributed the different time periods he was aware of as intervals between major catastrophes, the last of which is found in Genesis.

Cuvier's claim that new fossil forms appear abruptly in the geological record and then continue without alteration in overlying strata was used by later critics of evolution to support creationism, to whom the abruptness seemed consistent with special divine creation (although Cuvier's finding that different types made their paleontological debuts in different geological strata clearly did not). The lack of change was consistent with the supposed sacred immutability of "species", but, again, the idea of extinction, of which Cuvier was the great proponent, obviously was not.

Many writers have unjustly accused Cuvier of obstinately maintaining that fossil human beings could never be found. In his Essay on the Theory of the Earth, he did say, "no human bones have yet been found among fossil remains", but he made it clear exactly what he meant: "When I assert that human bones have not been hitherto found among extraneous fossils, I must be understood to speak of fossils, or petrifactions, properly so called". Petrified bones, which have had time to mineralize and turn to stone, are typically far older than bones found to that date. Cuvier's point was that all human bones found that he knew of, were of relatively recent age because they had not been petrified and had been found only in superficial strata. He was not dogmatic in this claim, however; when new evidence came to light, he included in a later edition an appendix describing a skeleton that he freely admitted was an "instance of a fossil human petrifaction".

The harshness of his criticism and the strength of his reputation, however, continued to discourage naturalists from speculating about the gradual transmutation of species, until Charles Darwin published On the Origin of Species more than two decades after Cuvier's death.

=== Extinction ===
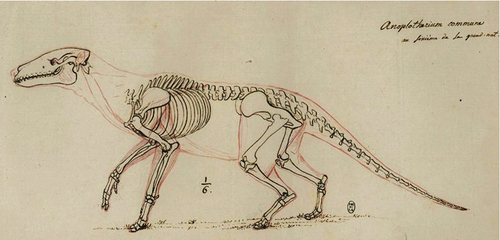
Georges Cuvier's 1812 skeletal reconstruction of Anoplotherium commune. The stratigraphy and lack of modern analogue in the extinct mammal was proof of extinction and ecological succession.

Early in his tenure at the National Museum in Paris, Cuvier published studies of fossil bones in which he argued that they belonged to large, extinct quadrupeds. His first two such publications were those identifying mammoth and mastodon fossils as belonging to extinct species rather than modern elephants and the study in which he identified the Megatherium as a giant, extinct species of sloth. His primary evidence for his identifications of mammoths and mastodons as separate, extinct species was the structure of their jaws and teeth. His primary evidence that the Megatherium fossil had belonged to a massive sloth came from his comparison of its skull with those of extant sloth species.

Cuvier wrote of his paleontological method that "the form of the tooth leads to the form of the condyle, that of the scapula to that of the nails, just as an equation of a curve implies all of its properties; and, just as in taking each property separately as the basis of a special equation we are able to return to the original equation and other associated properties, similarly, the nails, the scapula, the condyle, the femur, each separately reveal the tooth or each other; and by beginning from each of them the thoughtful professor of the laws of organic economy can reconstruct the entire animal."

However, Cuvier's actual method was heavily dependent on the comparison of fossil specimens with the anatomy of extant species in the necessary context of his vast knowledge of animal anatomy and access to unparalleled natural history collections in Paris. This reality, however, did not prevent the rise of a popular legend that Cuvier could reconstruct the entire bodily structures of extinct animals given only a few fragments of bone.

At the time Cuvier presented his 1796 paper on living and fossil elephants, it was still widely believed that no species of animal had ever become extinct. Authorities such as Buffon had claimed that fossils found in Europe of animals such as the woolly rhinoceros and the mammoth were remains of animals still living in the tropics (i.e. rhinoceros and elephants), which had shifted out of Europe and Asia as the earth became cooler.

Thereafter, Cuvier performed a pioneering research study on some elephant fossils excavated around Paris. The bones he studied, however, were remarkably different from the bones of elephants currently thriving in India and Africa. This discovery led Cuvier to denounce the idea that fossils came from those that are currently living. The idea that these bones belonged to elephants living – but hiding – somewhere on Earth seemed ridiculous to Cuvier, because it would be nearly impossible to miss them due to their enormous size. The Megatherium provided another compelling data point for this argument. Ultimately, his repeated identification of fossils as belonging to species unknown to man, combined with mineralogical evidence from his stratigraphical studies in Paris, drove Cuvier to the proposition that the abrupt changes the Earth underwent over a long period of time caused some species to go extinct.

Cuvier's theory on extinction has met opposition from other notable natural scientists like Darwin and Charles Lyell. Unlike Cuvier, they didn't believe that extinction was a sudden process; they believed that like the Earth, animals collectively undergo gradual change as a species. This differed widely from Cuvier's theory, which seemed to propose that animal extinction was catastrophic.

However, Cuvier's theory of extinction is still justified in the case of mass extinctions that occurred in the last 600 million years, when approximately half of all living species went completely extinct within a short geological span of two million years, due in part by volcanic eruptions, asteroids, and rapid fluctuations in sea level. At this time, new species rose and others fell, precipitating the arrival of human beings. Cuvier's early work demonstrated conclusively that extinction was indeed a credible natural global process. Cuvier's thinking on extinctions was influenced by his extensive readings in Greek and Latin literature; he gathered every ancient report known in his day relating to discoveries of petrified bones of remarkable size in the Mediterranean region.

Influence on Cuvier's theory of extinction was his collection of specimens from the New World, many of them obtained from Native Americans. He also maintained an archive of Native American observations, legends, and interpretations of immense fossilized skeletal remains, sent to him by informants and friends in the Americas. He was impressed that most of the Native American accounts identified the enormous bones, teeth, and tusks as animals of the deep past that had been destroyed by catastrophe.

=== Catastrophism ===
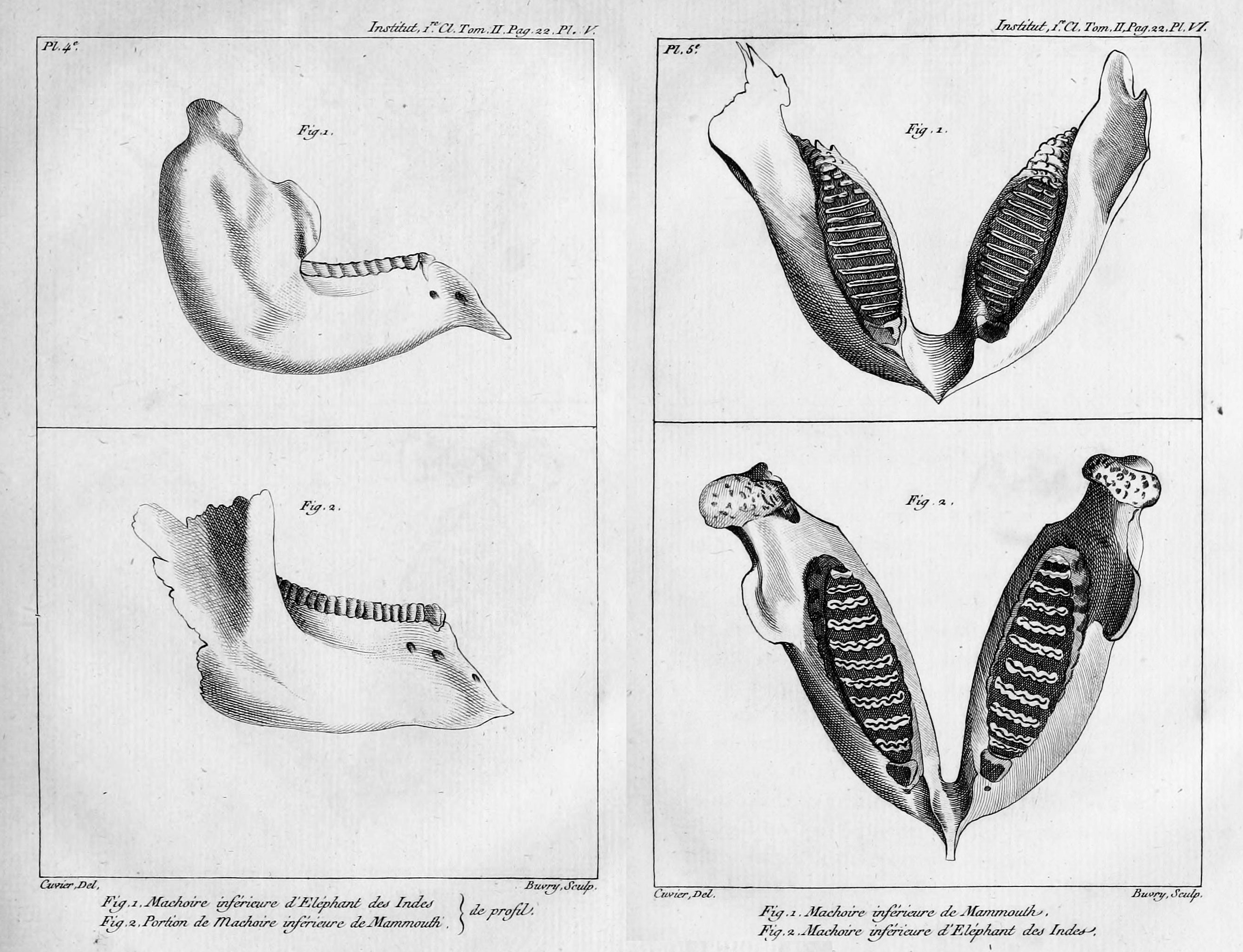
These Indian elephant and mammoth jaws were included in 1799 when Cuvier's 1796 paper on living and fossil elephants was printed.

Cuvier came to believe that most, if not all, the animal fossils he examined were remains of species that had become extinct. Near the end of his 1796 paper on living and fossil elephants, he said:

All of these facts, consistent among themselves, and not opposed by any report, seem to me to prove the existence of a world previous to ours, destroyed by some kind of catastrophe.

Contrary to many natural scientists' beliefs at the time, Cuvier believed that animal extinction was not a product of anthropogenic causes. Instead, he proposed that humans were around long enough to indirectly maintain the fossilized records of ancient Earth. He also attempted to verify the water catastrophe by analyzing records of various cultural backgrounds. Though he found many accounts of the water catastrophe unclear, he did believe that such an event occurred at the brink of human history nonetheless.

This led Cuvier to become an active proponent of the geological school of thought called catastrophism, which maintained that many of the geological features of the earth and the history of life could be explained by catastrophic events that had caused the extinction of many species of animals. Over the course of his career, Cuvier came to believe there had not been a single catastrophe, but several, resulting in a succession of different faunas. He wrote about these ideas many times, in particular, he discussed them in great detail in the preliminary discourse (an introduction) to a collection of his papers, Recherches sur les ossements fossiles de quadrupèdes (Researches on quadruped fossil bones), on quadruped fossils published in 1812.

Cuvier's own explanation for such a catastrophic event is derived from two different sources, including those from Jean-André Deluc and Déodat de Dolomieu. The former proposed that the continents existing ten millennia ago collapsed, allowing the ocean floors to rise higher than the continental plates and become the continents that now exist today. The latter proposed that a massive tsunami hit the globe, leading to mass extinction. Whatever the case was, he believed that the deluge happened quite recently in human history. In fact, he believed that Earth's existence was limited and not as extended as many natural scientists, like Lamarck, believed it to be.

Much of the evidence he used to support his catastrophist theories has been taken from his fossil records. He strongly suggested that the fossils he found were evidence of the world's first reptiles, followed chronologically by mammals and humans. Cuvier didn't wish to delve much into the causation of all the extinction and introduction of new animal species but rather focused on the sequential aspects of animal history on Earth. In a way, his chronological dating of Earth's history somewhat reflected Lamarck's transformationist theories.

Cuvier also worked alongside Alexandre Brongniart in analyzing the Parisian rock cycle. Using stratigraphical methods, they were both able to extrapolate key information regarding Earth history from studying these rocks. These rocks contained remnants of molluscs, bones of mammals, and shells. From these findings, Cuvier and Brongniart concluded that many environmental changes occurred in quick catastrophes, though Earth itself was often placid for extended periods of time in between sudden disturbances.

The 'Preliminary Discourse' became very well known and, unauthorized translations were made into English, German, and Italian (and in the case of those in English, not entirely accurately). In 1826, Cuvier published a revised version under the name, Discours sur les révolutions de la surface du globe (Discourse on the upheavals of the surface of the globe).

After Cuvier's death, the catastrophic school of geological thought lost ground to uniformitarianism, as championed by Charles Lyell and others, which claimed that the geological features of the earth were best explained by currently observable forces, such as erosion and volcanism, acting gradually over an extended period of time. The increasing interest in the topic of mass extinction starting in the late twentieth century, however, has led to a resurgence of interest among historians of science and other scholars in this aspect of Cuvier's work.

=== Stratigraphy ===
Cuvier collaborated for several years with Alexandre Brongniart, an instructor at the Paris mining school, to produce a monograph on the geology of the region around Paris. They published a preliminary version in 1808 and the final version was published in 1811.

In this monograph, they identified characteristic fossils of different rock layers that they used to analyze the geological column, the ordered layers of sedimentary rock, of the Paris basin. They concluded that the layers had been laid down over an extended period during which there clearly had been faunal succession and that the area had been submerged under sea water at times and at other times under fresh water. Along with William Smith's work during the same period on a geological map of England, which also used characteristic fossils and the principle of faunal succession to correlate layers of sedimentary rock, the monograph helped establish the scientific discipline of stratigraphy. It was a major development in the history of paleontology and the history of geology.

=== Age of reptiles ===
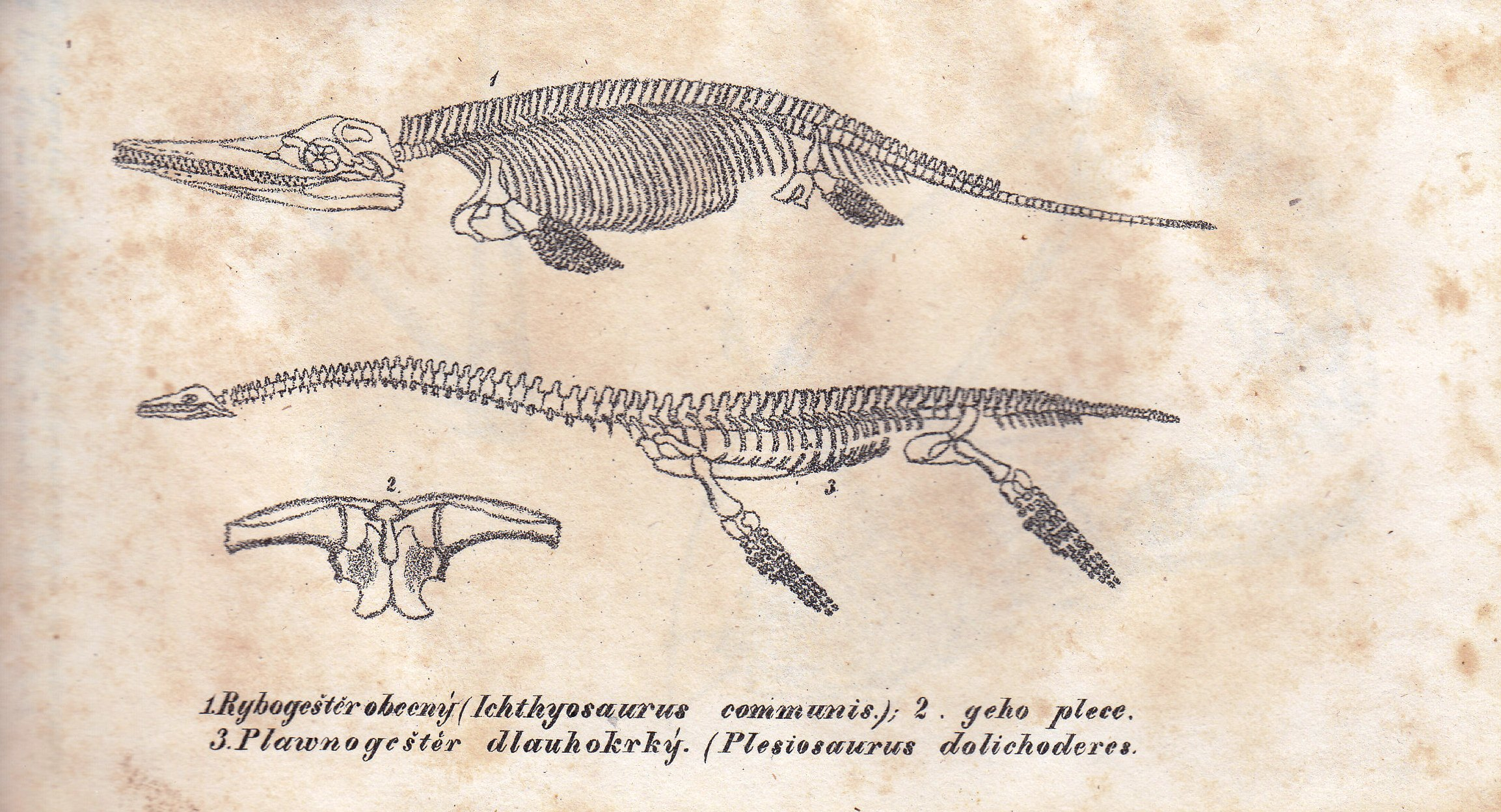
Ichthyosaurus and Plesiosaurus from the 1834 Czech edition of Cuvier's Discours sur les revolutions de la surface du globe

In 1800 and working only from a drawing, Cuvier was the first to correctly identify in print, a fossil found in Bavaria as a small flying reptile, which he named the Ptero-Dactyle in 1809, (later Latinized as Pterodactylus antiquus)—the first known member of the diverse order of pterosaurs. In 1808 Cuvier identified a fossil found in Maastricht as a giant marine lizard, the first known mosasaur.

Cuvier speculated correctly that there had been a time when reptiles rather than mammals had been the dominant fauna. This speculation was confirmed over the two decades following his death by a series of spectacular finds, mostly by English geologists and fossil collectors such as Mary Anning, William Conybeare, William Buckland, and Gideon Mantell, who found and described the first ichthyosaurs, plesiosaurs, and dinosaurs.

=== Principle of the correlation of parts ===
In a 1798 paper on the fossil remains of an animal found in some plaster quarries near Paris, Cuvier states what is known as the principle of the correlation of parts. He writes:

If an animal's teeth are such as they must be, in order for it to nourish itself with flesh, we can be sure without further examination that the whole system of its digestive organs is appropriate for that kind of food, and that its whole skeleton and locomotive organs, and even its sense organs, are arranged in such a way as to make it skillful at pursuing and catching its prey. For these relations are the necessary conditions of existence of the animal; if things were not so, it would not be able to subsist.

This idea is referred to as Cuvier's principle of correlation of parts, which states that all organs in an animal's body are deeply interdependent. Species' existence relies on the way in which these organs interact. For example, a species whose digestive tract is best suited to digesting flesh but whose body is best suited to foraging for plants cannot survive. Thus in all species, the functional significance of each body part must be correlated to the others, or else the species cannot sustain itself.

==== Applications ====
Cuvier believed that the power of his principle came in part from its ability to aid in the reconstruction of fossils. In most cases, fossils of quadrupeds were not found as complete, assembled skeletons, but rather as scattered pieces that needed to be put together by anatomists. To make matters worse, deposits often contained the fossilized remains of several species of animals mixed together. Anatomists reassembling these skeletons ran the risk of combining remains of different species, producing imaginary composite species. However, by examining the functional purpose of each bone and applying the principle of correlation of parts, Cuvier believed that this problem could be avoided.

This principle's ability to aid in the reconstruction of fossils was also helpful to Cuvier's work in providing evidence in favour of extinction. The strongest evidence Cuvier could provide in favour of extinction would be to prove that the fossilized remains of an animal belonged to a species that no longer existed. By applying Cuvier's principle of correlation of parts, it would be easier to verify that a fossilized skeleton had been authentically reconstructed, thus validating any observations drawn from comparing it to skeletons of existing species.

In addition to helping anatomists reconstruct fossilized remains, Cuvier believed that his principle also held enormous predictive power. For example, when he discovered a fossil that resembled a marsupial in the gypsum quarries of Montmartre, he correctly predicted that the fossil would contain bones commonly found in marsupials in its pelvis as well.

==== Impact ====
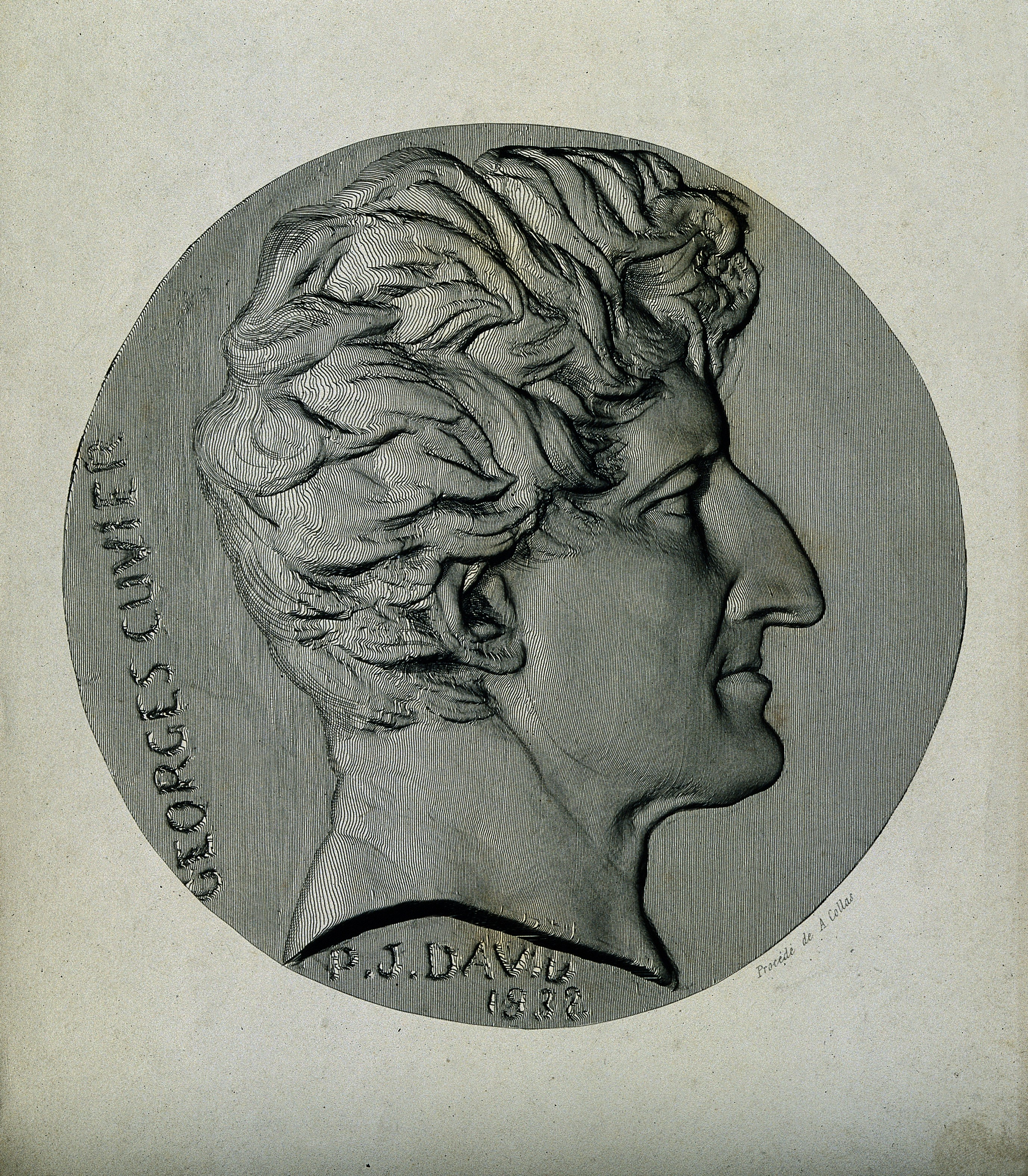
Line engraving of Cuvier, 1832

Cuvier hoped that his principles of anatomy would provide the law-based framework that would elevate natural history to the truly scientific level occupied by physics and chemistry thanks to the laws established by Isaac Newton (1643 – 1727) and Antoine Lavoisier (1743 – 1794), respectively. He expressed confidence in the introduction to Le Règne Animal that someday anatomy would be expressed as laws as simple, mathematical, and predictive as Newton's laws of physics, and he viewed his principle as an important step in that direction. To him, the predictive capabilities of his principles demonstrated in his prediction of the existence of marsupial pelvic bones in the gypsum quarries of Montmartre demonstrated that these goals were not only in reach, but imminent.

The principle of correlation of parts was also Cuvier's way of understanding function in a non-evolutionary context, without invoking a divine creator. In the same 1798 paper on the fossil remains of an animal found in plaster quarries near Paris, Cuvier emphasizes the predictive power of his principle, writing,

Today comparative anatomy has reached such a point of perfection that, after inspecting a single bone, one can often determine the class, and sometimes even the genus of the animal to which it belonged, above all if that bone belonged to the head or the limbs ... This is because the number, direction, and shape of the bones that compose each part of an animal's body are always in a necessary relation to all the other parts, in such a way that—up to a point—one can infer the whole from any one of them and vice versa.

Though Cuvier believed that his principle's major contribution was that it was a rational, mathematical way to reconstruct fossils and make predictions, in reality, it was difficult for Cuvier to use his principle. The functional significance of many body parts was still unknown at the time, and so relating those body parts to other body parts using Cuvier's principle was impossible. Though Cuvier was able to make accurate predictions about fossil finds, in practice, the accuracy of his predictions came not from application of his principle, but rather from his vast knowledge of comparative anatomy. However, despite Cuvier's exaggerations of the power of his principle, the basic concept is central to comparative anatomy and paleontology.

== Scientific work ==
=== Comparative anatomy and classification ===
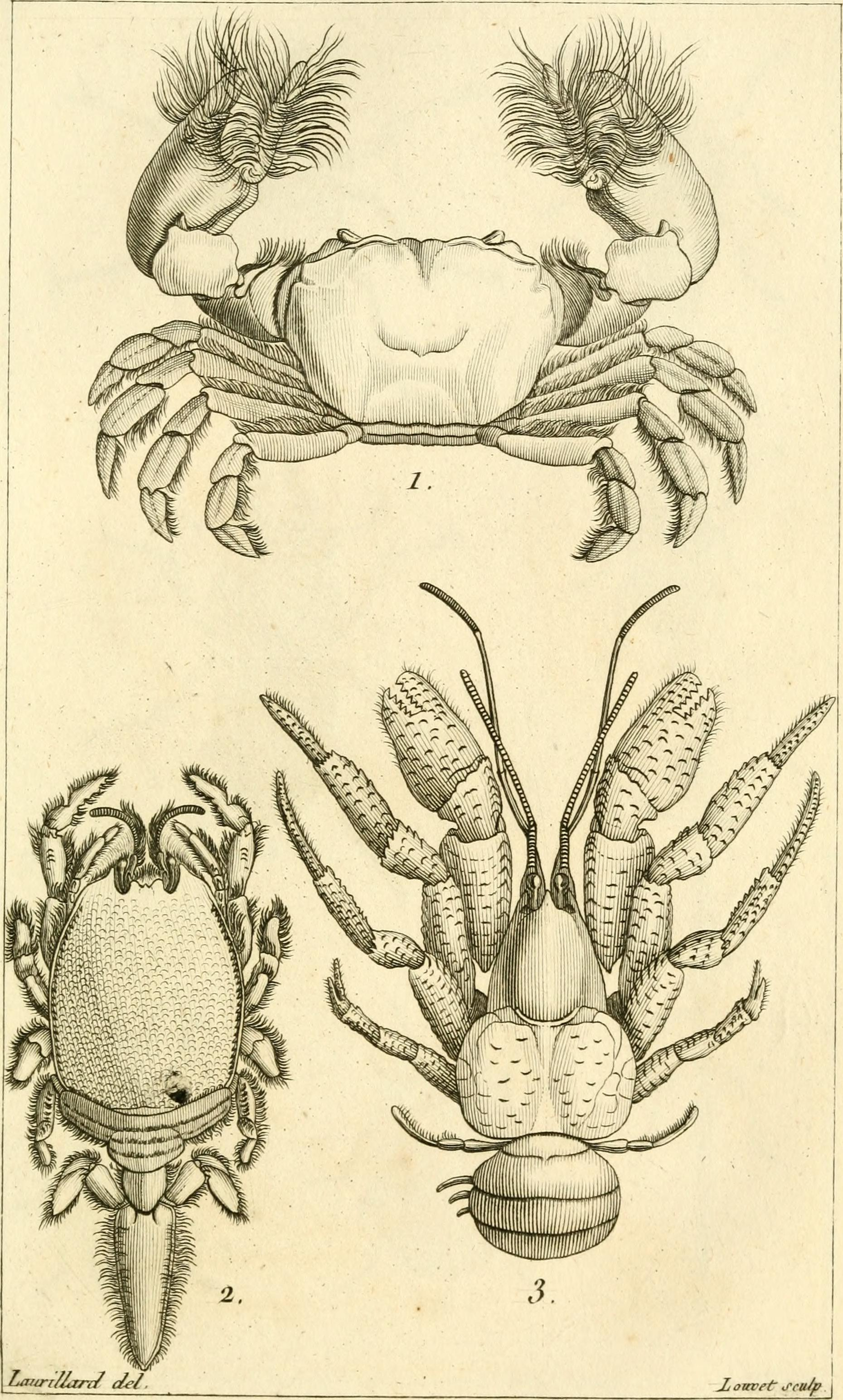
Plate from Le Règne Animal, 1817 edition

At the Paris Museum, Cuvier furthered his studies on the anatomical classification of animals. He believed that classification should be based on how organs collectively function, a concept he called functional integration. Cuvier reinforced the idea of subordinating less vital body parts to more critical organ systems as part of anatomical classification. He included these ideas in his 1817 book, The Animal Kingdom.

In his anatomical studies, Cuvier believed function played a bigger role than form in the field of taxonomy. His scientific beliefs rested in the idea of the principles of the correlation of parts and of the conditions of existence. The former principle accounts for the connection between organ function and its practical use for an organism to survive. The latter principle emphasizes the animal's physiological function in relation to its surrounding environment. These findings were published in his scientific readings, including Leçons d'anatomie comparée (Lessons on Comparative Anatomy) between 1800 and 1805, (Note: Cuvier was assisted by A. M. C. Duméril for the first two volumes and Georges Louis Duvernoy for the three later ones.) and The Animal Kingdom in 1817.

Ultimately, Cuvier developed four embranchements, or branches, through which he classified animals based on his taxonomical and anatomical studies. He later performed groundbreaking work in classifying animals in vertebrate and invertebrate groups by subdividing each category. For instance, he proposed that the invertebrates could be segmented into three individual categories, including Mollusca, Radiata, and Articulata. He also articulated that species cannot move across these categories, a theory called transmutation. He reasoned that organisms cannot acquire or change their physical traits over time and still retain optimal survival. As a result, he often conflicted with Geoffroy Saint-Hilaire and Jean-Baptiste Lamarck's theories of transmutation.

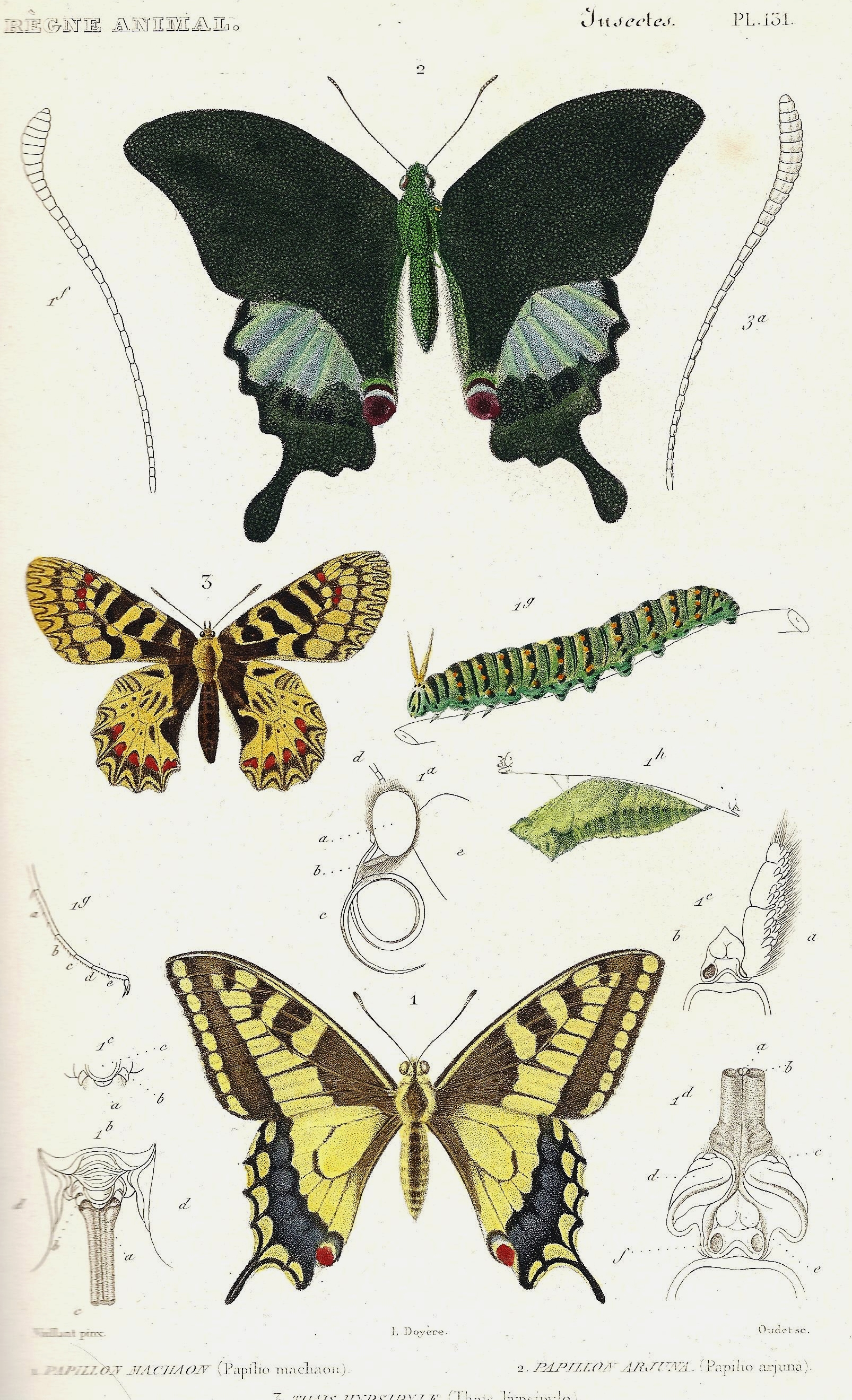
Plate from Le Règne Animal, 1828 edition

In 1798, Cuvier published his first independent work, the Tableau élémentaire de l'histoire naturelle des animaux, which was an abridgement of his course of lectures at the École du Pantheon and may be regarded as the foundation and first statement of his natural classification of the animal kingdom.

=== Mollusks ===
Cuvier categorized snails, cockles, and cuttlefish into one category he called molluscs (Mollusca), an embranchment. Though he noted how all three of these animals were outwardly different in terms of shell shape and diet, he saw a noticeable pattern pertaining to their overall physical appearance.

Cuvier began his intensive studies of molluscs during his time in Normandy – the first time he had ever seen the sea – and his papers on the so-called Mollusca began appearing as early as 1792. However, most of his memoirs on this branch were published in the Annales du museum between 1802 and 1815; they were subsequently collected as Mémoires pour servir à l'histoire et à l'anatomie des mollusques, published in one volume at Paris in 1817.

=== Fish ===
Cuvier's researches on fish, begun in 1801, finally culminated in the publication of the Histoire naturelle des poissons, which contained descriptions of 5,000 species of fishes, and was a joint production with Achille Valenciennes. Cuvier's work on this project extended over the years 1828–1831.

=== Palaeontology and osteology ===
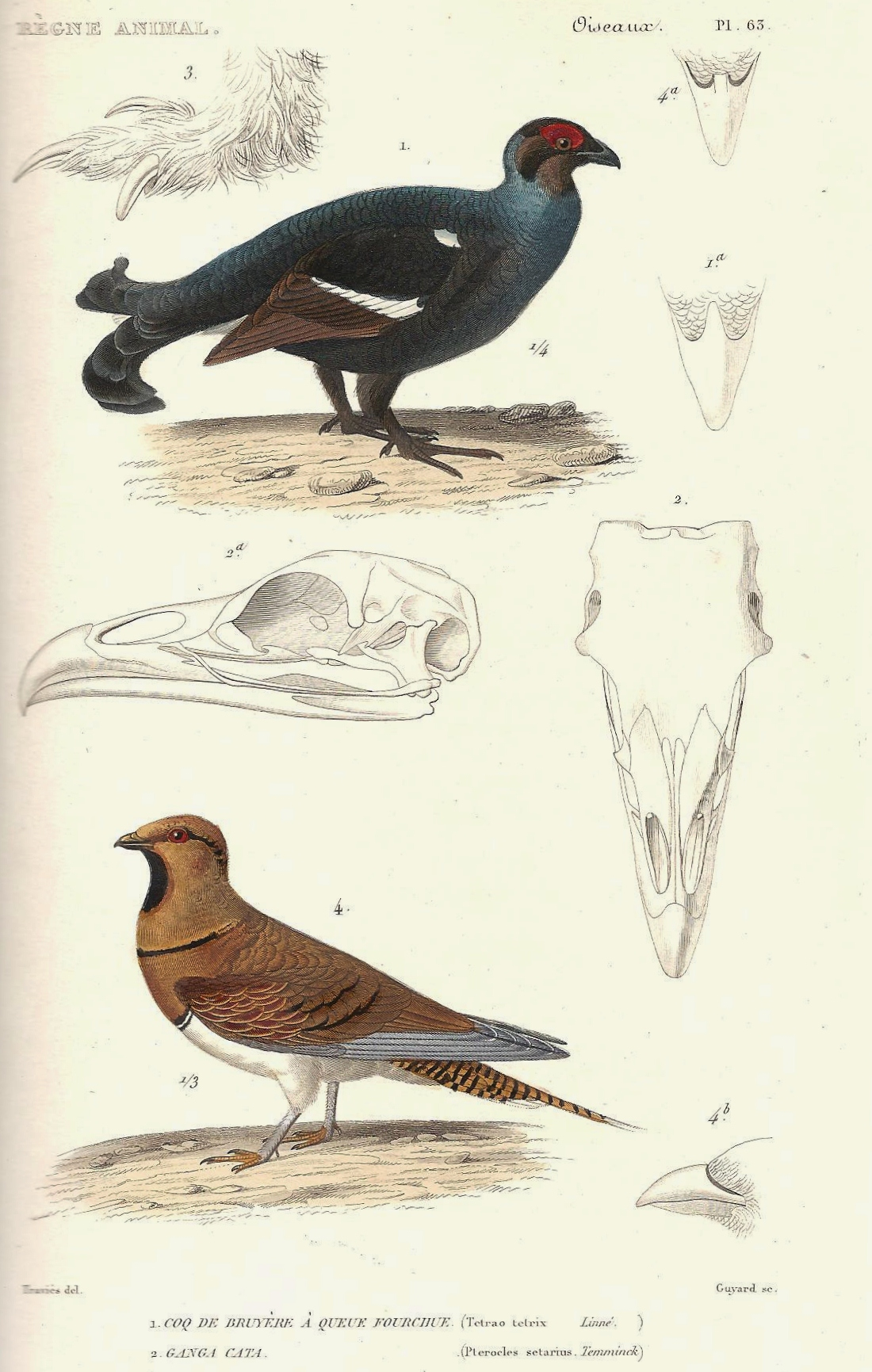
Plate from Le Règne Animal, 1828 edition

In palaeontology, Cuvier published a long list of memoirs, partly relating to the bones of extinct animals, and partly detailing the results of observations on the skeletons of living animals, specially examined with a view toward throwing light upon the structure and affinities of the fossil forms.

Among living forms he published papers relating to the osteology of the Rhinoceros indicus, the tapir, Hyrax capensis, the hippopotamus, the sloths, the manatee, etc.

He produced an even larger body of work on fossils, dealing with the extinct mammals of the Eocene beds of Montmartre and other localities near Paris, such as the Buttes Chaumont, the fossil species of hippopotamus, Palaeotherium, Anoplotherium, a marsupial (which he called Didelphys gypsorum), the Megalonyx, the Megatherium, the cave-hyena, the pterodactyl, the extinct species of rhinoceros, the cave bear, the mastodon, the extinct species of elephant, fossil species of manatee and seals, fossil forms of crocodilians, chelonians, fish, birds, etc. If his identification of fossil animals was dependent upon comparison with the osteology of extant animals whose anatomy was poorly known, Cuvier would often publish a thorough documentation of the relevant extant species' anatomy before publishing his analyses of the fossil specimens. The department of palaeontology dealing with the Mammalia may be said to have been essentially created and established by Cuvier.

The results of Cuvier's principal palaeontological and geological investigations ultimately were given to the world in the form of two separate works: Recherches sur les ossemens fossiles de quadrupèdes (Paris, 1812; later editions in 1821 and 1825); and Discours sur les revolutions de la surface du globe (Paris, 1825). In this latter work he expounded a scientific theory of Catastrophism.

=== The Animal Kingdom (Le Règne Animal) ===
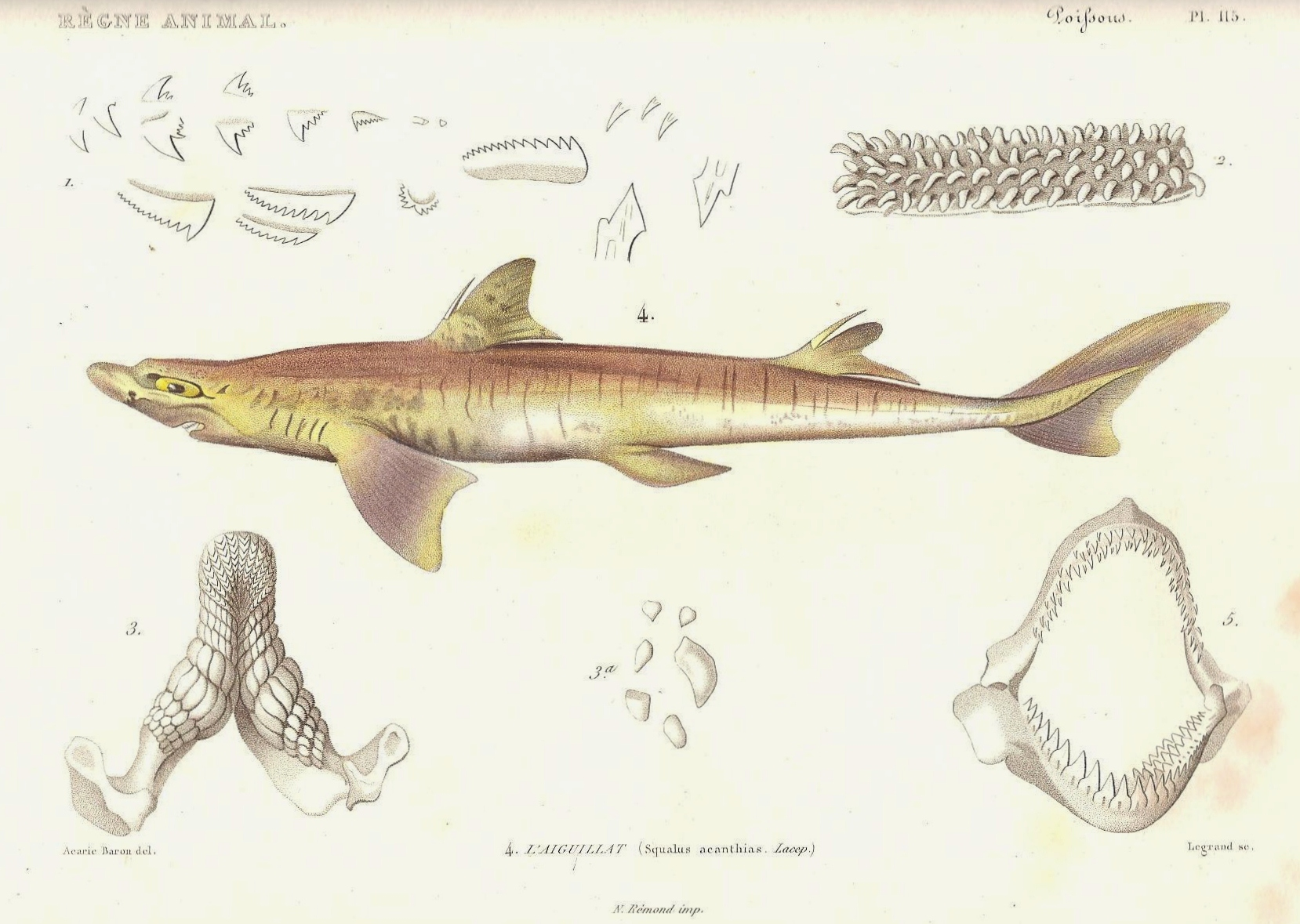
Plate from Le Règne Animal, 1828 edition

Cuvier's most admired work was his Le Règne Animal. It appeared in four octavo volumes in 1817; a second edition in five volumes was brought out in 1829–1830. In this classic work, Cuvier presented the results of his life's research into the structure of living and fossil animals. With the exception of the section on insects, in which he was assisted by his friend Latreille, the whole of the work was his own. It was translated into English many times, often with substantial notes and supplementary material updating the book in accordance with the expansion of knowledge.

=== Racial studies ===
Cuvier was a Protestant and a believer in monogenism, who held that all men descended from the biblical Adam, although his position usually was confused as polygenist. Some writers who have studied his racial work have dubbed his position as "quasi-polygenist", and most of his racial studies have influenced scientific racism. Cuvier believed there were three distinct races: the Caucasian (white), Mongolian (yellow), and the Ethiopian (black). Cuvier claimed that Adam and Eve were Caucasian, the original race of mankind. The other two races originated from survivors escaping in different directions after a major catastrophe hit the earth 5,000 years ago, with those survivors then living in complete isolation from each other.

Cuvier categorized these divisions he identified into races according to his perception of the beauty or ugliness of their skulls and the quality of their civilizations. Cuvier's racial studies held the supposed features of polygenism, namely fixity of species; limits on environmental influence; unchanging underlying type; anatomical and cranial measurement differences in races; and physical and mental differences between distinct races.

==== Sarah Baartman ====
Alongside other French naturalists, Cuvier subjected Sarah Baartman, a South African Khokhoi woman exhibited in European freak shows as the "Hottentot Venus", to examinations. At the time that Cuvier interacted with Baartman, Baartman's "existence was really quite miserable and extraordinarily poor. Sara was literally [sic] treated like an animal." In 1815, while Baartman was very ill, Cuvier commissioned a nude painting of her. She died shortly afterward, aged 26.

Following Baartman's death, Cuvier sought out and received permission to dissect her body, focusing on her genitalia, buttocks and skull shape. In his examination, Cuvier concluded that many of Baartman's features more closely resembled the anatomy of a monkey than a human. Her remains were displayed in the Musée de l'Homme in Paris until 1970, then were put into storage. Her remains were returned to South Africa in 2002.

== Taxa described by him ==
- See Category:Taxa named by Georges Cuvier

== Official and public work ==
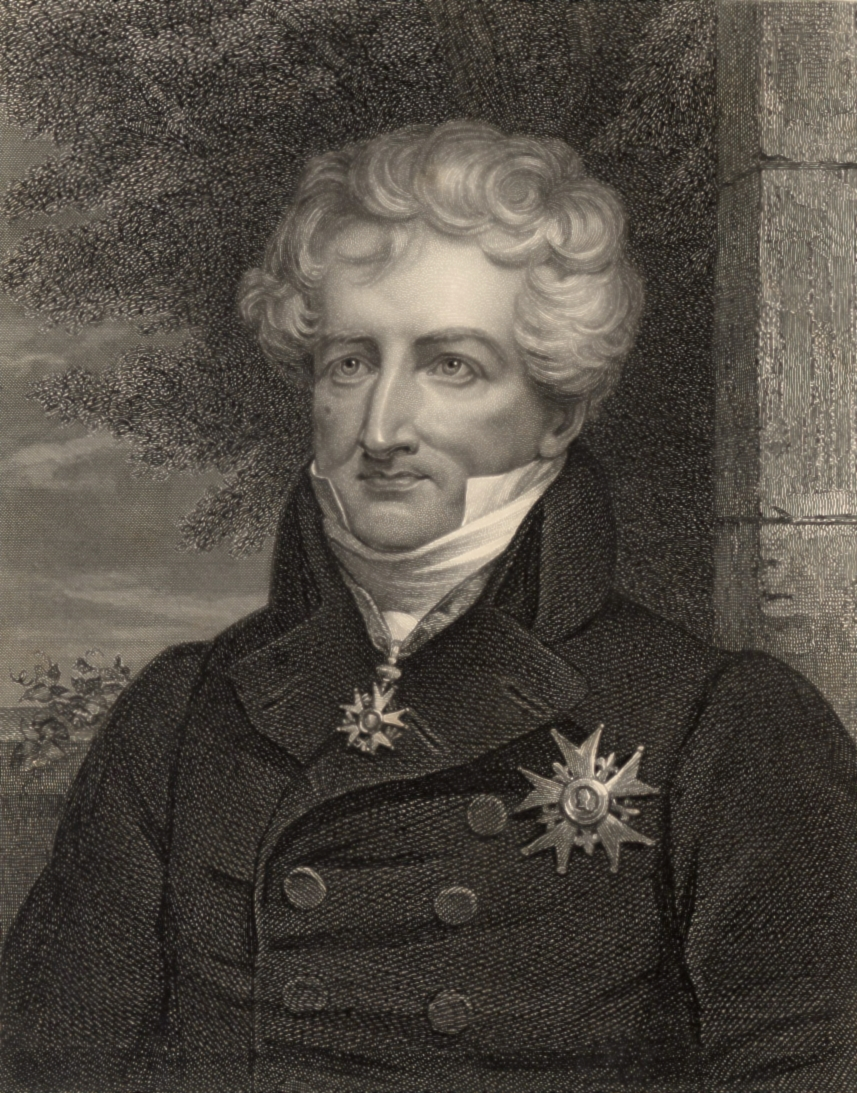
Engraving by James Thomson

Apart from his own original investigations in zoology and paleontology Cuvier carried out a vast amount of work as perpetual secretary of the National Institute, and as an official connected with public education generally; and much of this work appeared ultimately in a published form. Thus, in 1808 he was placed by Napoleon upon the council of the Imperial University, and in this capacity he presided (in the years 1809, 1811, and 1813) over commissions charged to examine the state of the higher educational establishments in the districts beyond the Alps and the Rhine that had been annexed to France, and to report upon the means by which these could be affiliated with the central university. He published three separate reports on this subject.

In his capacity, again, of perpetual secretary of the Institute, he not only prepared a number of éloges historiques on deceased members of the Academy of Sciences, but was also the author of a number of reports on the history of the physical and natural sciences, the most important of these being the Rapport historique sur le progrès des sciences physiques depuis 1789, published in 1810.

Prior to the fall of Napoleon (1814) he had been admitted to the council of state, and his position remained unaffected by the restoration of the Bourbons. He was elected chancellor of the university, in which capacity he acted as interim president of the council of public instruction, while he also, as a Lutheran, superintended the faculty of Protestant theology. In 1819 he was appointed president of the committee of the interior, an office he retained until his death.

In 1826 he was made grand officer of the Legion of Honour; he subsequently was appointed president of the council of state. He served as a member of the Académie des Inscriptions et Belles-Lettres from 1830 to his death. A member of the Doctrinaires, he was nominated to the ministry of the interior in the beginning of 1832.

== Commemorations ==
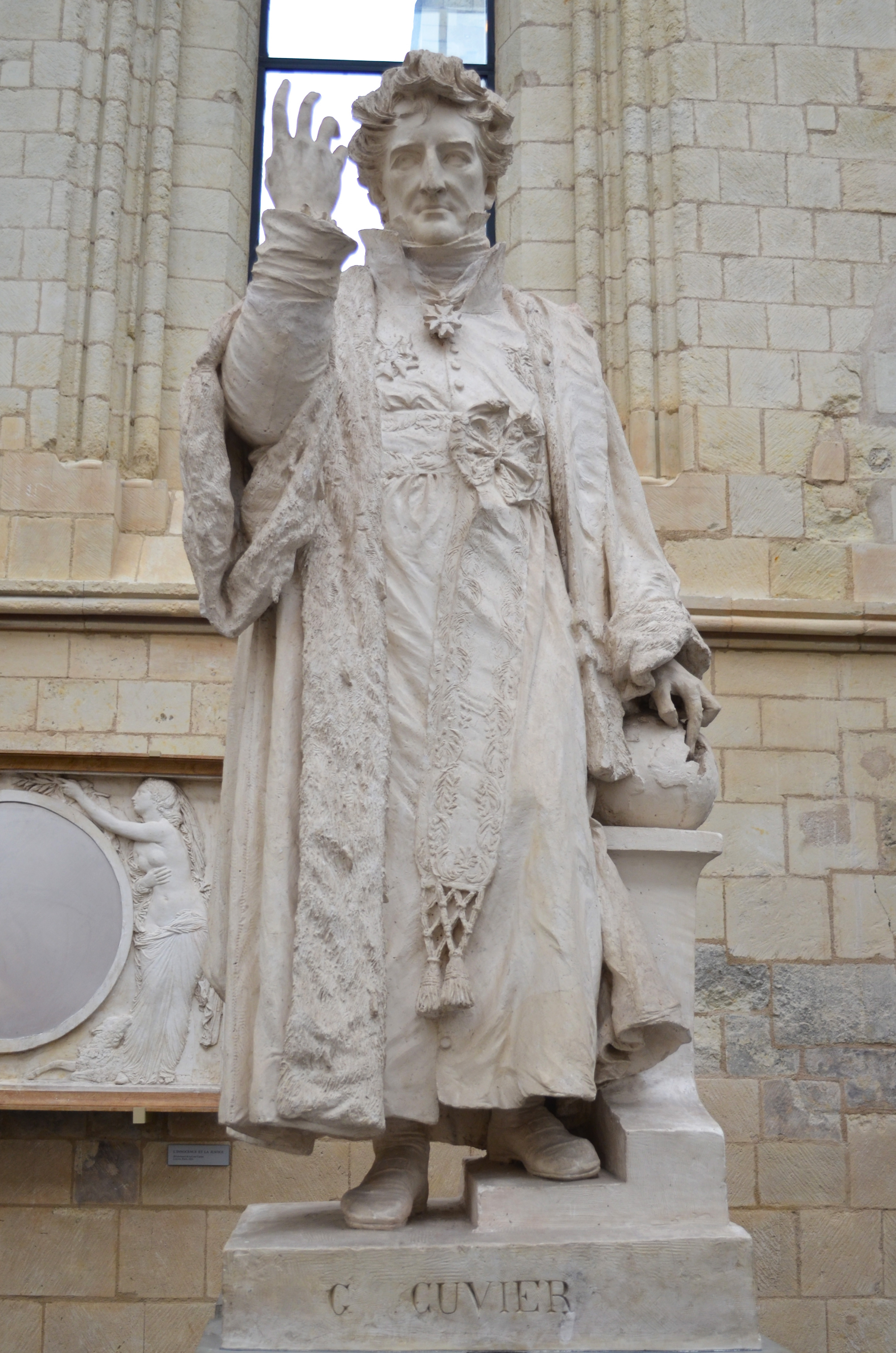
Statue of Cuvier by David d'Angers, 1838

Cuvier is commemorated in the naming of several animals; they include Cuvier's beaked whale (which he first thought to be extinct), Cuvier's gazelle, Cuvier's toucan, Cuvier's bichir, Cuvier's dwarf caiman, and Galeocerdo cuvier (tiger shark). Cuvier is commemorated in the scientific name of the following reptiles: Anolis cuvieri (a lizard from Puerto Rico), Bachia cuvieri (a synonym of Bachia alleni), and Oplurus cuvieri.

The fish Hepsetus cuvieri, sometimes known as the African pike or Kafue pike characin, which is a predatory freshwater fish found in southern Africa was named after him.

There also are some extinct animals named after Cuvier, such as the South American giant sloth Catonyx cuvieri.

Cuvier Island in New Zealand was named after Cuvier by D'Urville. The Cuvier crater on the Moon is named after him.

The professor of English Wayne Glausser argues at length that the Aubrey-Maturin series of 21 novels (1970–2004) by Patrick O'Brian make the character Stephen Maturin "an advocate of the neo-classical paradigm articulated .. by Georges Cuvier."

Cuvier is referenced in Edgar Allan Poe's short story The Murders in the Rue Morgue as having written a description of the orangutan. Arthur Conan Doyle also refers to Cuvier in The Five Orange Pips, in which Sherlock Holmes compares Cuvier's methods to his own.

There is a statue of Cuvier standing in front of the Hôtel de Ville in Montbéliard.

== Works ==
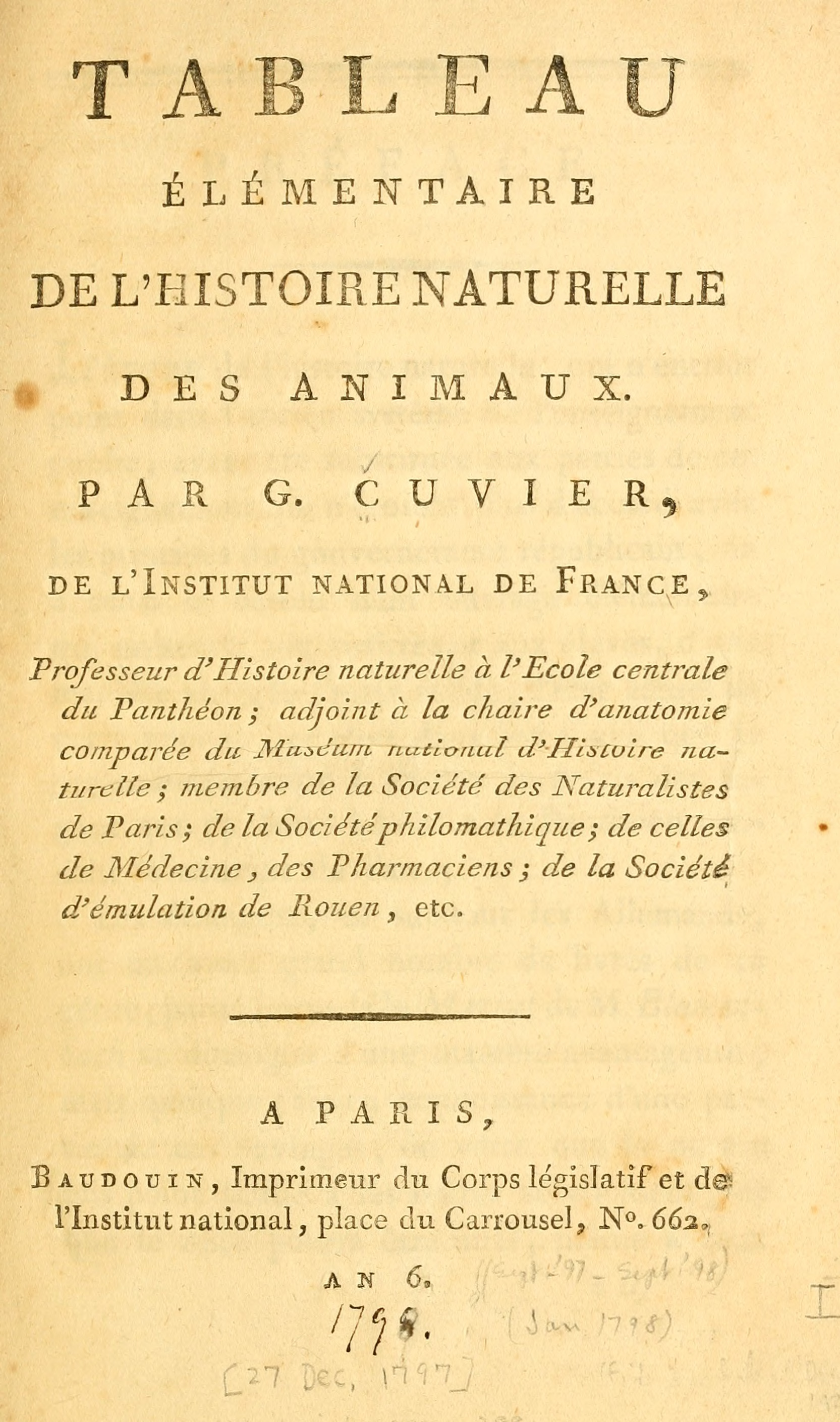
Tableau élémentaire de l'histoire naturelle des animaux, 1797

- Tableau élémentaire de l'histoire naturelle des animaux (1797–1798)
- Leçons d'anatomie comparée (5 volumes, 1800–1805)
- Essais sur la géographie minéralogique des environs de Paris, avec une carte géognostique et des coupes de terrain, with Alexandre Brongniart (1811)
- Le Règne animal distribué d'après son organisation, pour servir de base à l'histoire naturelle des animaux et d'introduction à l'anatomie comparée (4 volumes, 1817)
- Recherches sur les ossemens fossiles de quadrupèdes, où l'on rétablit les caractères de plusieurs espèces d'animaux que les révolutions du globe paroissent avoir détruites (4 volumes, 1812) (text in French) 2 3 4
- Mémoires pour servir à l'histoire et à l'anatomie des mollusques (1817)
- Éloges historiques des membres de l'Académie royale des sciences, lus dans les séances de l'Institut royal de France par M. Cuvier (3 volumes, 1819–1827) Vol. 1, Vol. 2, and Vol. 3
- Théorie de la terre (1821)

--- Essay on the theory of the earth, 1813; 1815, trans. Robert Kerr.

- Recherches sur les ossemens fossiles, 1821–1823 (5 vols).
- Discours sur les révolutions de la surface du globe et sur les changements qu'elles ont produits dans le règne animal (1822). New edition: Christian Bourgeois, Paris, 1985. (text in French)
- Histoire des progrès des sciences naturelles depuis 1789 jusqu'à ce jour (5 volumes, 1826–1836)
- Histoire naturelle des poissons (11 volumes, 1828–1848), continued by Achille Valenciennes
- Histoire des sciences naturelles depuis leur origine jusqu'à nos jours, chez tous les peuples connus, professée au Collège de France (5 volumes, 1841–1845), edited, annotated, and published by Magdeleine de Saint-Agit
- Cuvier's History of the Natural Sciences: twenty-four lessons from Antiquity to the Renaissance [edited and annotated by Theodore W. Pietsch, translated by Abby S. Simpson, foreword by Philippe Taquet], Paris: Publications scientifiques du Muséum national d'Histoire naturelle, 2012, 734 p. (coll. Archives; 16) ISBN 978-2-85653-684-1
- Variorum of the works of Georges Cuvier: Preliminary Discourse of the Recherches sur les ossemens fossiles 1812, containing the Memory on the ibis of the ancient Egyptians, and the Discours sur les révolutions de la surface du Globe 1825, containing the Determination of the birds called ibis by the ancient Egyptians

Cuvier also collaborated on the Dictionnaire des sciences naturelles (61 volumes, 1816–1845) and on the Biographie universelle (45 volumes, 1843–18??)

== Taxa named in his honour ==
- Anampses cuvier, commonly known as the Pearl wrasse, a fish found in the Pacific Ocean.
- Paromola cuvieri, a crab from the northern hemisphere.
- Cuvieronius, a genus of extinct gomphothere.
- Tiger shark (Galeocerdo cuvier)

== See also ==
- Saartjie Baartman, the "Hottentot Venus" whose body Cuvier examined
- Frédéric Cuvier, also a naturalist, was Georges Cuvier's younger brother.
- History of paleontology for more on the impact of Cuvier's scientific ideas
- List of works by James Pradier
