= Javan treeshrew =

Conservation status
- Data Deficient (IUCN 3.1)

Scientific classification
- Kingdom: Animalia
- Phylum: Chordata
- Class: Mammalia
- Order: Scandentia
- Family: Tupaiidae
- Genus: Tupaia
- Species: T. hypochrysa

Binomial name
- Tupaia hypochrysa Thomas, 1895
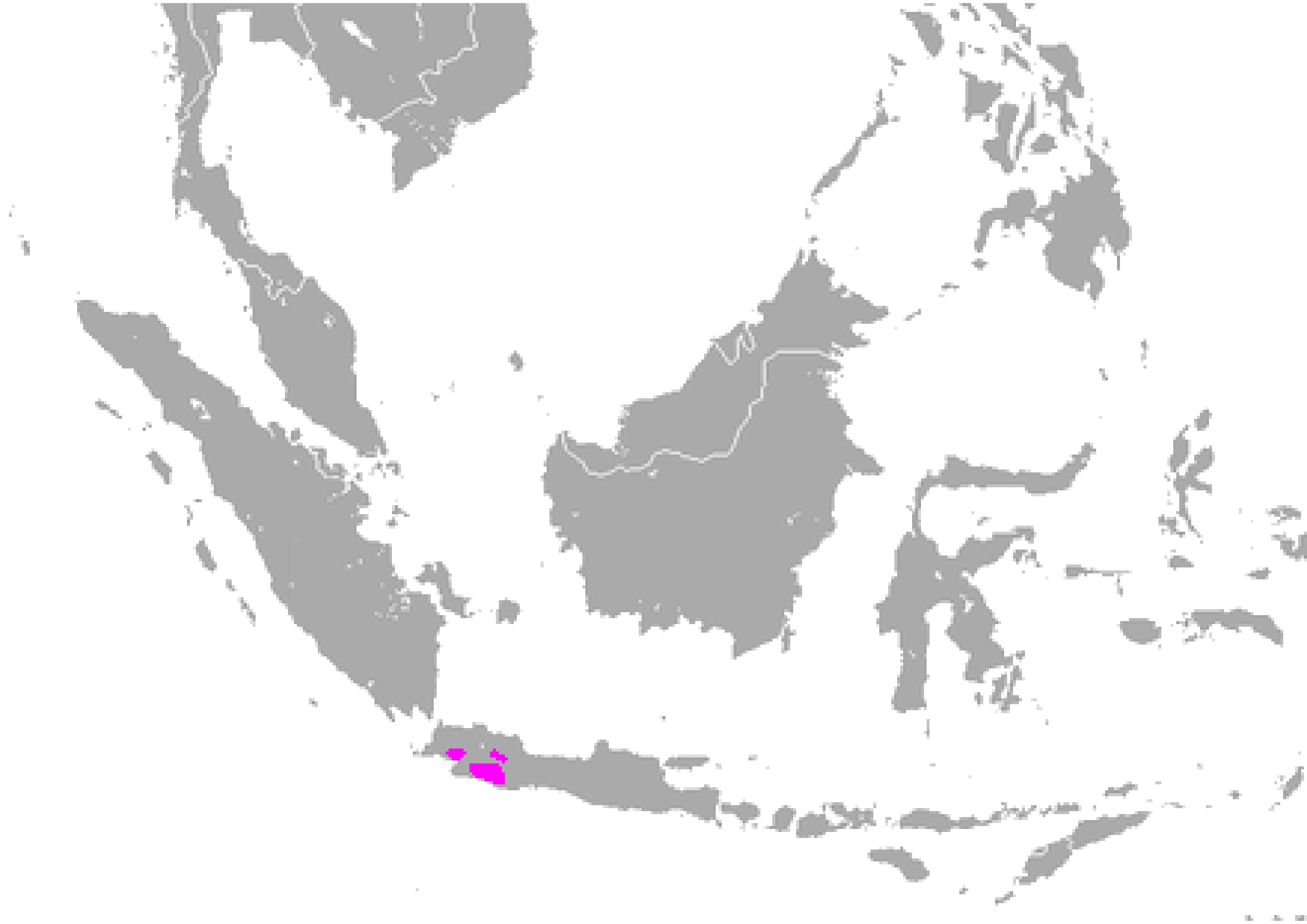

Species of mammal

The Javan treeshrew (Tupaia hypochrysa) or large Javan treeshrew is a treeshrew species within the Tupaiidae family. It was originally described as a subspecies of Tupaia ferruginea and later listed as a junior synonym of Tupaia glis, but was raised up to species status in 2013. It is found on the island of Java in Indonesia.
