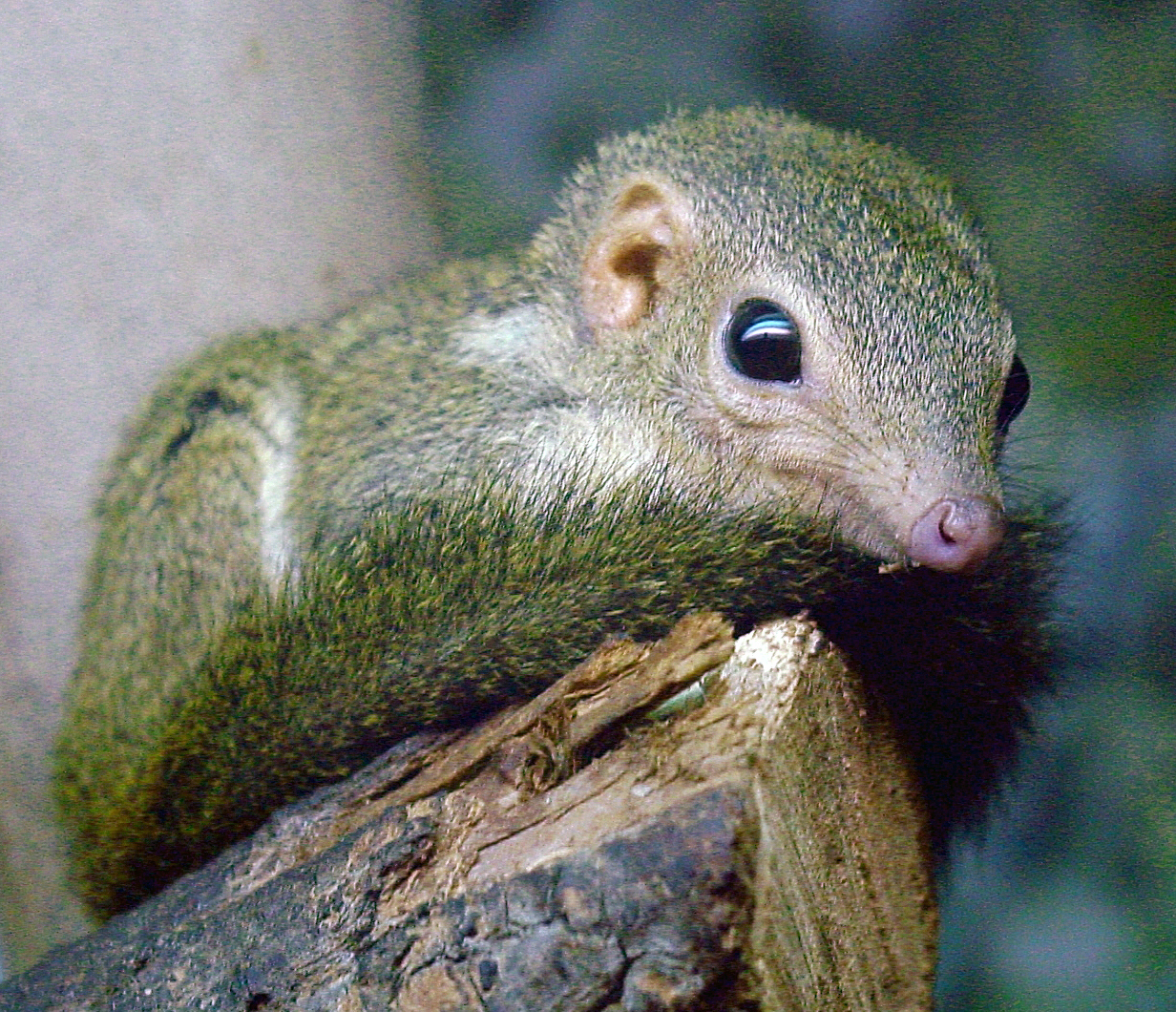
- Pygmy treeshrew

Scientific classification
- Kingdom: Animalia
- Phylum: Chordata
- Class: Mammalia
- Order: Scandentia
- Family: Tupaiidae
- Genus: Tupaia; Raffles, 1821

Type species
- Tupaia ferruginea Raffles, 1821

Species
- See text.

Synonyms
- Chladobates Schinz, 1824; Cladobates F. Cuvier, 1825; Gladobates Schinz, 1824; Glipora Jentink, 1888; Glirisorex Scudder, 1882; Glisorex Desmarest, 1822; Glisosorex Giebel, 1855; Hylogale Temminck, 1827; Hylogalea Schlegel and Mueller, 1843; Lyonogale Conisbee, 1953; Palaeotupaia Chopra and Vasishat, 1979; Sorex-glis É. Geoffroy and F. Cuvier, 1822; Tana Lyon, 1913; Tapaia Gray, 1860; Tupaja Haeckel, 1866; Tupaya É. Geoffroy and F. Cuvier, 1822

= Tupaia (mammal) =

Genus of mammals

Tupaia is a treeshrew genus in the family Tupaiidae that was first described by Thomas Stamford Raffles in 1821.

== Taxonomy ==
Raffles provided the name of this genus, which derives from the Malay word tupai meaning a squirrel or a small animal resembling one.

== Characteristics ==
Raffles described the genus as having an elongated snout, eight to 10 incisors, well-developed limbs, five-toed naked feet, and the sole furnished with projecting pads and sharp claws, with a habit and tail of a squirrel.

Marcus Ward Lyon published a revision of the genus in 1913, and also noted the squirrel-like appearance of Tupaia species, which only lack the long black whiskers and have smaller ears. They do not have any markings on the face, the naked area of the nose is finely reticulated, an oblique stripe on the shoulder is more or less distinct, and the tail is haired but not tufted. The braincase is about as wide as the maxillary tooth row is long. The temporal fossa is smaller than the orbit. The dental formula is 2.1.3.33.1.3.3. The first pair of upper incisors is longer than the second, while the second pair of lower incisors is slightly larger than the first and third pairs. The lower canines are better developed than the upper ones and stand high above the adjacent premolars. The size of head, body, and tail varies between species.

One outstanding characteristic of Tupaia species is their color vision. They have rod and cone visual receptors similar to humans and other primates.

== Classification and taxonomic history ==
When Diard and Duvaucel described the first specimen of the common treeshrew Tupaia glis in 1820, they considered it a species of Sorex. T. everetti was moved back into the genus from Urogale, disbanding the latter, based on a 2011 molecular phylogeny.

The following species are in the genus Tupaia:

- Northern treeshrew T. belangeri — (Wagner, 1841)
- Golden-bellied treeshrew T. chrysogaster — G. S. Miller, 1903
- Bangka Island treeshrew T. dicolor — Lyon, 1906
- Striped treeshrew T. dorsalis — Schlegel, 1857
- Mindanao treeshrew T. everetti — Thomas, 1892
- Sumatran treeshrew T. ferruginea — Raffles 1821
- Common treeshrew T. glis — Diard & Duvaucel, 1820
- Slender treeshrew T. gracilis — Thomas, 1893
- Javan treeshrew T. hypochrysa — Thomas, 1895
- Horsfield's treeshrew T. javanica — Horsfield, 1821
- Long-footed treeshrew T. longipes — Thomas, 1893
- Pygmy treeshrew T. minor — Günther, 1876
- Mountain treeshrew T. montana — Thomas, 1892
- Nicobar treeshrew T. nicobarica — (Zelebor, 1868)
- Palawan treeshrew T. palawanensis — Thomas, 1894
- Painted treeshrew T. picta — Thomas, 1892
- Kalimantan treeshrew T. salatana — Lyon, 1895
- Ruddy treeshrew T. splendidula — J.E. Gray, 1865
- Large treeshrew T. tana — Raffles, 1821
- †Tupaia miocenica — Mein & Ginsburg, 1997

In the past, various authors proposed to place treeshrews in the ordinal rank Insectivora, or considered them close relatives of primates. Since 1972, the treeshrew families Tupaiidae and Ptilocercidae are grouped in the order Scandentia.

== Distribution and habitat ==
Tupaia species range from northeastern India, Myanmar, Nicobar Islands eastward to some of the Philippine Islands, and from central China south to Java, Borneo and Sumatra, including islands on the southwest coast. They do not occur on Celebes, nor on islands to the east of Java, with the possible exception of Bali.

They inhabit the dense undergrowth of tropical forests. With the exception of T. minor, they are primarily terrestrial and forage on the forest floor, usually below 1.5 m (4 ft 11 in). Since they are rarely seen crossing wide roads, populations likely are negatively affected by fragmentation of forests caused by logging operations.

== Ecology and behaviour ==
Early naturalists described wild-caught captive Tupaia specimens as restless, nervous, and rapidly reacting to sounds and movements. Their auditory sensitivity is highly developed as the broad frequency range of their hearing reaches far into the ultrasonic.

The shape of the cheek-teeth of Tupaia species indicate they are foremost insectivores. Captive specimens were reported to hunt ants, flies, crickets, grasshoppers, cockroaches, and small beetles. They hold their food between their forelegs while sitting on their haunches. After feeding, they smooth their heads and faces with both forepaws, and lick their lips and palms. They are also fond of water, both to drink and to bathe. They fortify their diet with soft fruits that are mostly dispersed by birds. They swallow the pulp, but reject fibrous components, which they cannot digest due to their long and small intestines and rudimentary ceca.

The well-developed olfactory perception of treeshrews enables them to easily detect food among the leaf litter on the forest floor. Their sensitivity for odours coupled with scent-marking of their territories is important in their interaction with conspecifics.

Observations of Tupaia species in their natural habitats suggest they usually form monogamous pairs. Social behaviour differs between species and the available food resources in their territories. Where food is adequate and sufficient, they tolerate conspecifics without engaging in territorial disputes. Common treeshrews observed in the Bukit Timah Nature Reserve defended diminishing food resources by chasing away residents of adjacent areas.

Birds of prey, snakes, and small carnivores are known to hunt treeshrews. Humans have no interest in killing them for food because of their unpleasant taste, and they are rarely seen as pests.

=== Reproduction and development ===
Treeshrews share more similarity with rodents and squirrels than with primates in regards to their reproduction and development. In contrast to primates, which produce one baby with longer gestation periods, treeshrews generally have litters of two or three young and are only in utero about 45 days. Female treeshrews give birth in nests made of many dry leaves, and are known to leave the young unattended while returning occasionally to give them milk. Parental care of Tupaia is relatively limited.

The young remain in the nest for 33 days on average, developing gradually before they exit the nest. Ten identified embryonic developmental stages are seen in Tupaia species. Baby treeshrews are sexually immature until about 90 days after birth.

== Medical research ==
Their close relationship to primates makes treeshrews important model organisms in human medical research. A study investigating the effects of the Borna disease virus on treeshrews has given new insight into neurological disease.

Since Tupaia species share so many similarities with primates, yet are more abundant and have more plentiful progeny than them, interest is increasing in using them as an alternative model for use in human medical research. Successful psychosocial studies were carried out, and dramatic behavioral, neuroendocrinal, and physiological changes occurred in subordinate males of Tupaia, similar to depressed human patients. Their susceptibility to viruses has also piqued interest in using them to study immune responses to infections such as hepatitis B. Tupaia species have been used to overcome the limitations of using rodent models in the study of human biology and disease mechanisms, as well as the development of new drugs and diagnostic tools. Recent studies have used treeshrews to study infectious, metabolic, neurological, and psychiatric diseases, as well as cancers.

In 2013, the Virology Journal published an article that documents the use of the northern treeshrew (T. belangeri) as medical models for the H1N1 influenza virus. This was advantageous because other possible candidates such as guinea pigs, rats, mice, and other rodents leave gaps in the information, especially regarding clinical symptoms and transmission. Tupaia, though, displays moderate systemic and respiratory symptoms, as well as pathological changes in the respiratory tract, supporting its use as a beneficial model in H1N1 research.
