= Myopia in animals =

Shortsightedness

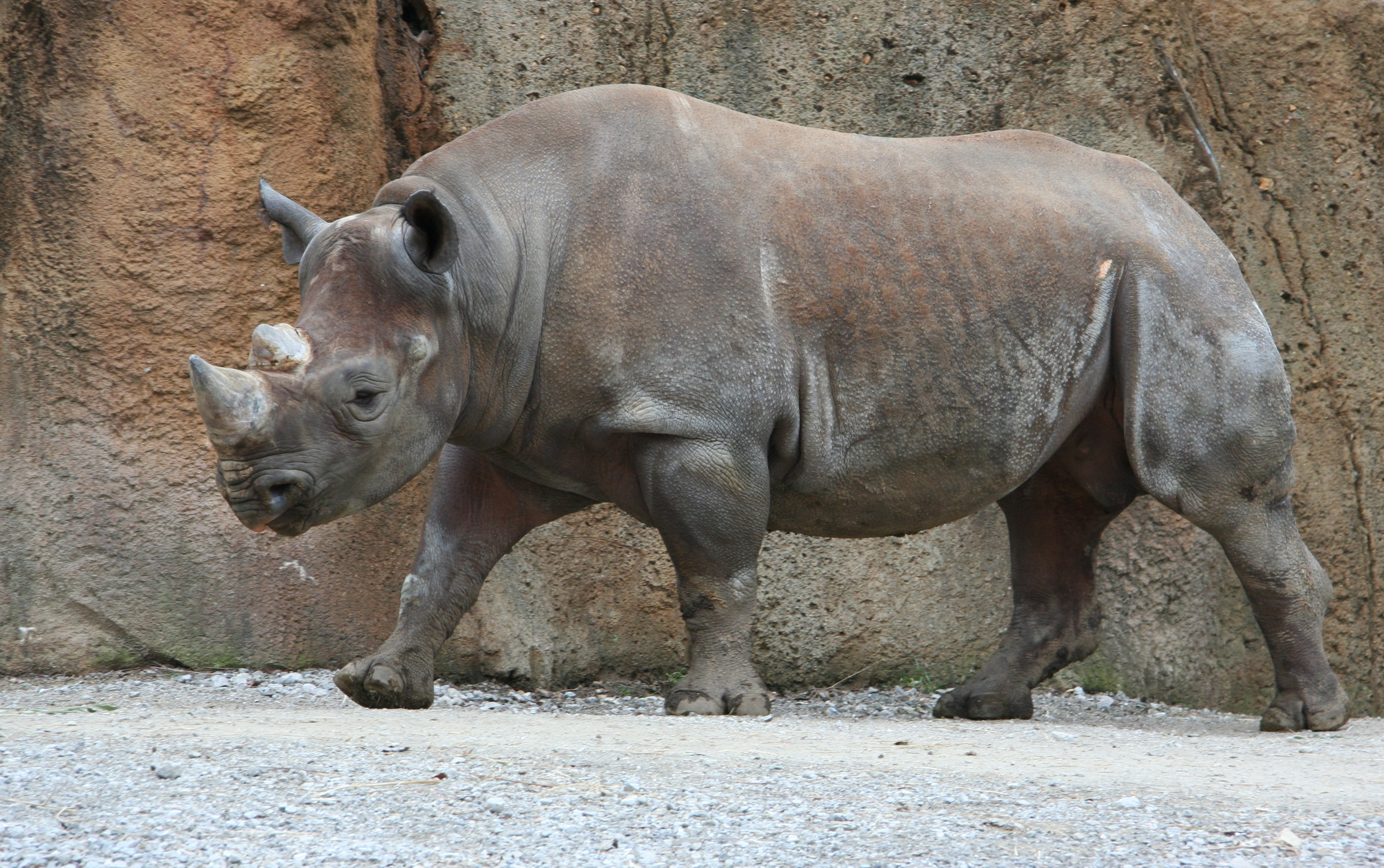
A rhinoceros, known for its poor eyesight

Some animals suffer from shortsightedness and have poor eyesight. In domestic animals, myopia, with or without astigmatism, occurs frequently.

== In rhinoceroses ==
Whereas the rhinoceros may suffer from less-than-adequate eyesight, it generally survives by concentrating with its superior hearing and sense of smell.

== Research ==
Myopia, with or without astigmatism, is the most common eye condition in horses. Several types of occlusion myopia have been recorded in tree shrews, macaques, cats and rats, deciphered from several animal-inducing myopia models. Preliminary laboratory investigations using retinoscopy of 240 dogs found myopic problems with varying degrees of refraction errors depending on the breed. In cases involving German Shepherds, Rottweilers and Miniature horses, the refraction errors were indicative of myopia. Nuclear sclerosis of the crystalline lens was noticed in older dogs.

Experiments into newborn macaque monkeys have revealed that surgically fusing the eyelid for one year results in eye deterioration as the eye has not had a chance to grow and develop. Keeping monkeys in the dark for a similar period, however, does not lead to myopia. In 1996, Maurice and Mushin conducted tests on rabbits by raising their body temperatures and intraocular pressures (IOP) and noted that while younger rabbits were prone to developing myopia, older rabbits were not.
