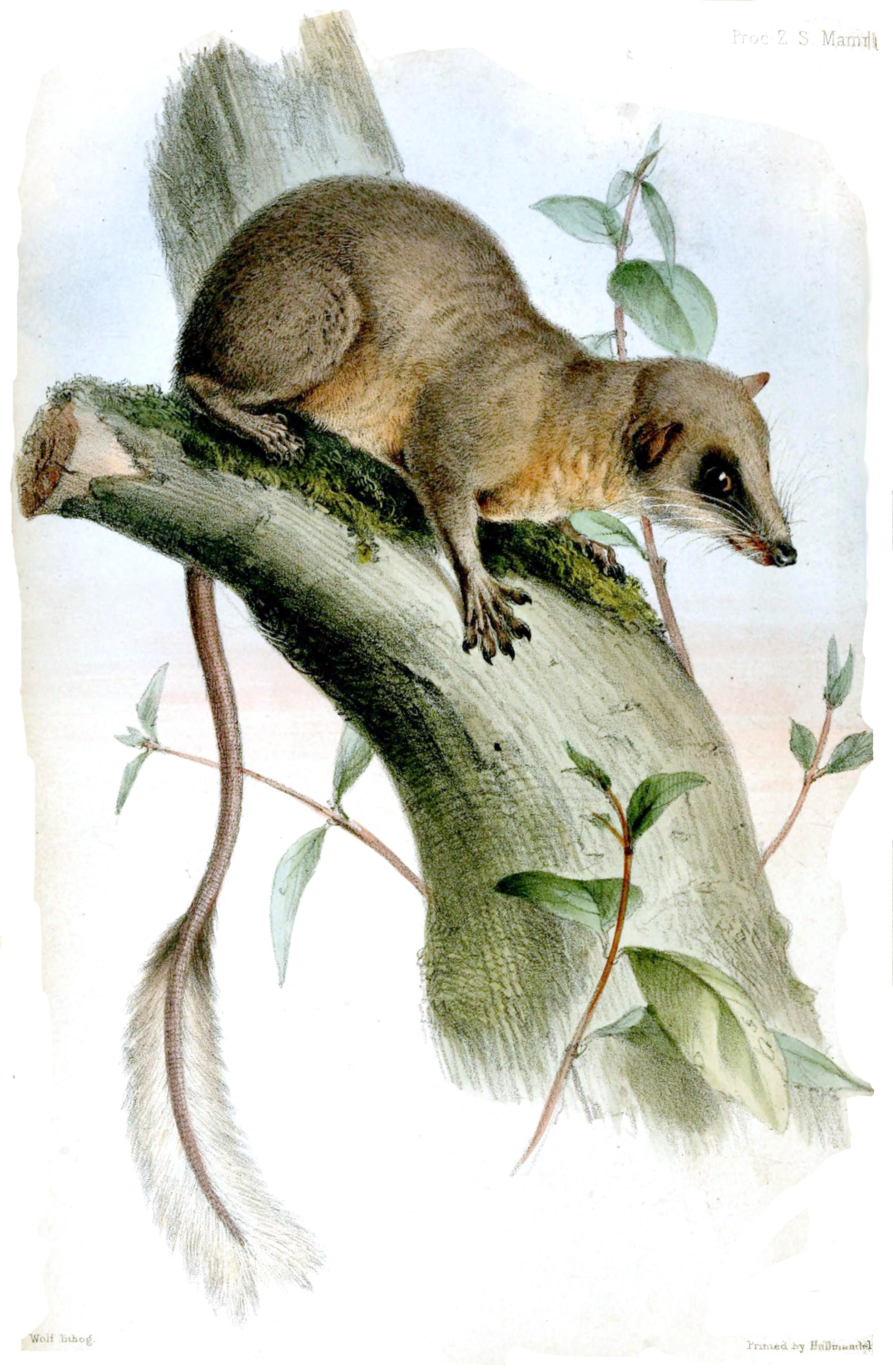
- Illustration in 1848 species description

Conservation status
- Least Concern (IUCN 3.1)
- CITES Appendix II

Scientific classification
- Kingdom: Animalia
- Phylum: Chordata
- Class: Mammalia
- Order: Scandentia
- Family: Ptilocercidae
- Genus: Ptilocercus
- Species: P. lowii

Binomial name
- Ptilocercus lowii J. E. Gray, 1848
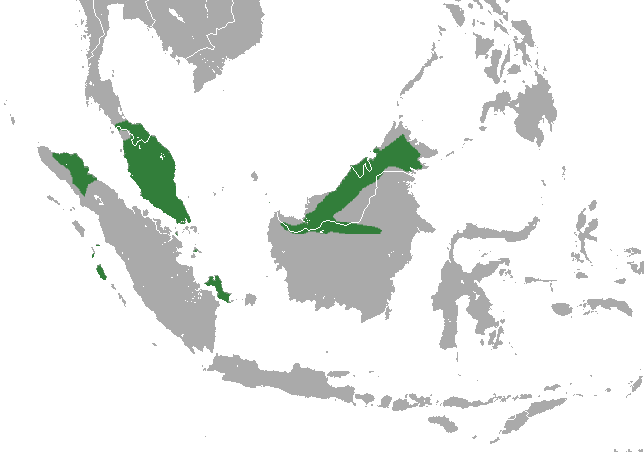
- Pen-tailed treeshrew range

= Pen-tailed treeshrew =

Species of mammal

The pen-tailed treeshrew (Ptilocercus lowii) is a treeshrew of the family Ptilocercidae native to southern Thailand, the Malay Peninsula, Borneo, and some Indonesian islands.

It is the only living species in the genus Ptilocercus. All other treeshrew species are grouped in the family Tupaiidae.

== Distribution and habitat ==
The pen-tailed treeshrew occurs from southern Thailand and the Malay Peninsula to northern Sumatra, Siberut, Bangka Island and northwestern Borneo. It inhabits foremost primary forest up to an elevation of 1,200 m (3,900 ft), where undergrowth is dense.

== Behaviour and ecology ==
Pen-tailed treeshrews studied in Malaysia spent several hours per night consuming naturally fermented nectar of the bertam palm. This nectar contains one of the highest alcohol concentrations of all natural foods. The pen-tailed treeshrews did not show any signs of intoxication, although they frequently consumed large amounts of this nectar, equivalent of 10–12 glasses of wine adjusted to body weight with an alcohol content up to 3.8%. Measurements of a biomarker of alcohol dehydrogenase suggest that they may be metabolizing it by a pathway that is not used as heavily by humans. Their ability to ingest high amounts of alcohol is hypothesized to have been an evolutionary adaptation. How pen-tailed treeshrews benefit from this alcohol ingestion or what consequences of consistent high blood alcohol content might factor into their physiology is unclear.

== Taxonomy and evolutionary history ==
The Ptilocercidae are a family within the order Scandentia. Numerous morphological and genetic differences support the classification of the Ptilocercidae as a separate family from the rest of the treeshrews which diverged around 60 million years ago. Treeshrews are considered very close relatives of primates, with the colugos being closer to primates.
