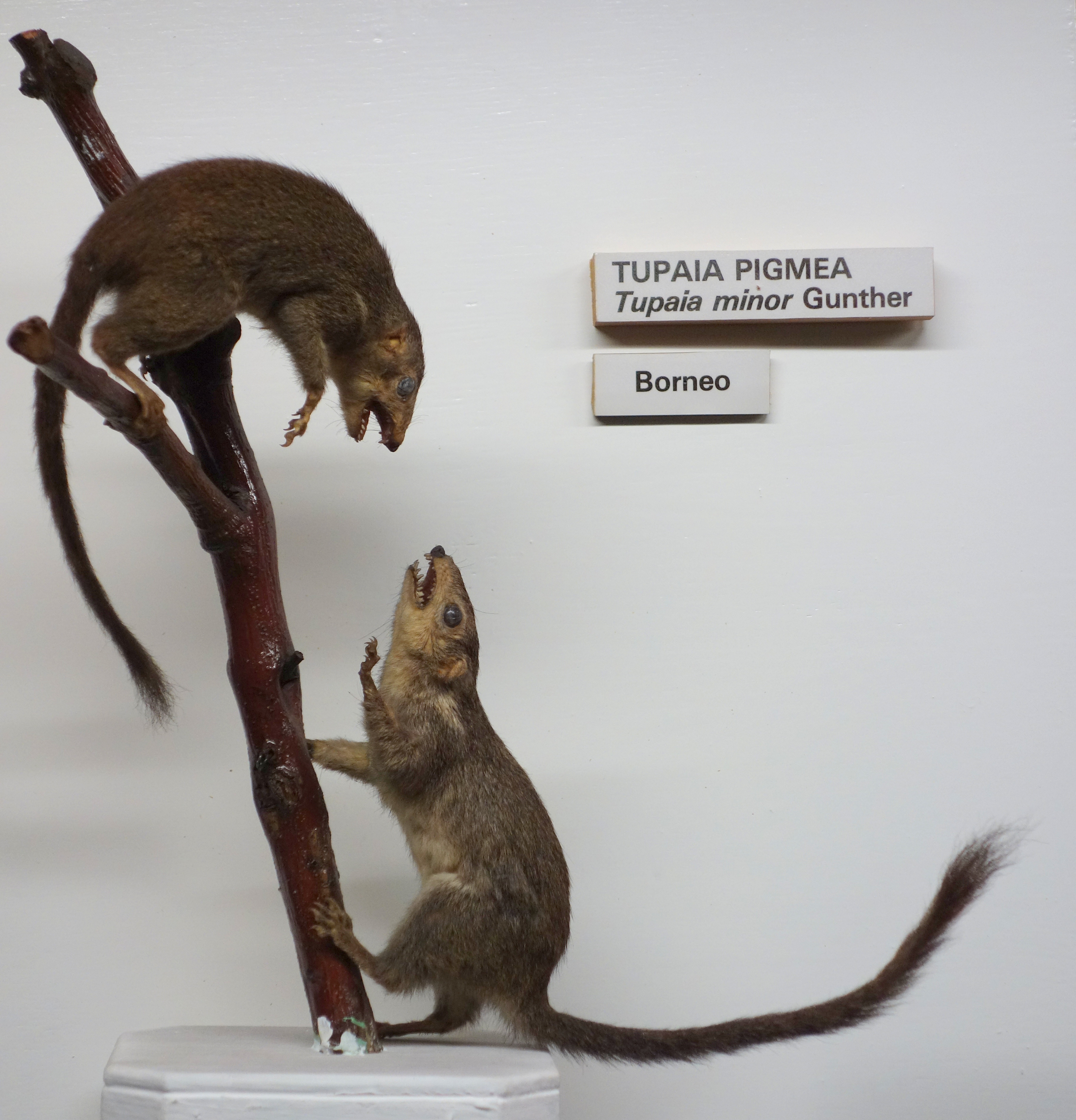

Conservation status
- Least Concern (IUCN 3.1)
- CITES Appendix II

Scientific classification
- Kingdom: Animalia
- Phylum: Chordata
- Class: Mammalia
- Order: Scandentia
- Family: Tupaiidae
- Genus: Tupaia
- Species: T. minor

Binomial name
- Tupaia minor Günther, 1876
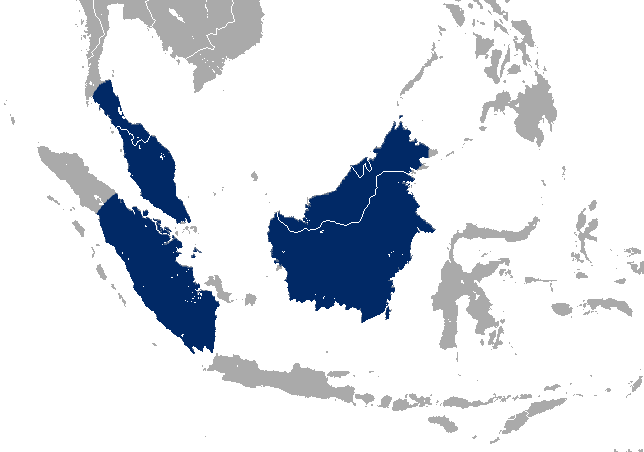
- Pygmy treeshrew range

= Pygmy treeshrew =

Species of mammal

The pygmy treeshrew (Tupaia minor) is a treeshrew species within the family Tupaiidae. It is native to Thailand, Malaysia and Indonesia. The generic name is derived from the Malay word tupai meaning squirrel or small animals that resemble squirrels.

== Distribution ==
Tupaia minor is distributed in peninsular Thailand, peninsular Malaysia, Sumatra, the Lingga Archipelago (Indonesia), Borneo, offshore islands of Laut (Indonesia), and Banggi and Balambangan (Malaysia). From the Catalogue of Mammal Skins in Sarawak Museum, Kuching, Sarawak, more than 30 individuals of T. minor have been collected from 1891 to 1991. The specimens were mostly caught in Mt Penrisen, Mt Dulit, Mt Poi, Gunung Gading, Bau, Ulu Baram, Saribas, Kuching, and Forest Research.

The species has no fossil record.

== Characteristics ==
The pygmy treeshrew's upper body hair is banded light and dark, giving a speckled olive-brown appearance. The upper parts are buffy and often have a reddish tinge towards the rear. The tail is long and thin, and its upper side is darker than the body. The limbs are equal in length and have long claws. The maximum total length is about 450 mm, half of which is the tail.

== Behavior, diet and reproduction ==
Tupaia minor is diurnal (active in the daytime). It is often seen 3 to 8 m above the ground, sometimes up to 20 m, travelling along lianas or branches of small trees. They spend most of their time on the ground and in low bushes, nesting in tree roots and fallen timber. T. minor moves in a semiplantigrade posture which allows it to keep its centre of gravity close to the tree. The claws on its hands and feet are quite sharp and moderately curved, which is useful for climbing.

Tupaia minor is omnivorous; its diet includes insects and fruit. Scandentia has little economic significance because they do little damage to crops or plantations. However, T. minor may be a seed disperser for several Ficus species.

Litters of one to three young are born after a gestation period of 45 to 55 days. Their maximum lifespan is around 9 to 10 years.
