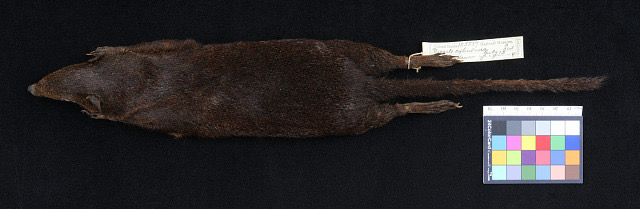
- A specimen of Tupaia everetti

Conservation status
- Least Concern (IUCN 3.1)
- CITES Appendix II (CITES)

Scientific classification
- Kingdom: Animalia
- Phylum: Chordata
- Class: Mammalia
- Order: Scandentia
- Family: Tupaiidae
- Genus: Tupaia
- Species: T. everetti

Binomial name
- Tupaia everetti Thomas, 1892
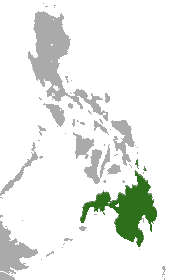
- Mindanao treeshrew range

= Mindanao treeshrew =

Species of mammal

The Mindanao treeshrew (Tupaia everetti), also called the Philippine tree shrew, is a species of treeshrew endemic to the Mindanao region in the Philippines. It was formerly considered the only member of the genus Urogale, but that genus was merged into Tupaia when the species was found to nest within the latter genus in a molecular phylogeny. The scientific name commemorates British colonial administrator and zoological collector Alfred Hart Everett.

== Range and habitat ==
It is found, as its name suggests, in Mindanao, in the Philippines. It lives in rain forest and montane forest.

== Description ==
It is the heaviest treeshrew, weighing about 355 g, and is terrestrial. The body is 17–20 cm, and the tail is 11–17 cm. It has a particularly elongated snout and a rounded, even-haired tail. The fur is brownish, but with orange or yellow underparts.

It is diurnal in its habits, and it climbs well and runs fast on the ground.

== Diet ==
Its diet is varied. It includes insects, lizards, young birds, bird's eggs, and fruit.

== Reproduction ==
In the wild, it is thought to nest on the ground or on cliffs. Their breeding habits have been observed in captivity, where females have produced one or two young after a gestation period of 54–56 days.
