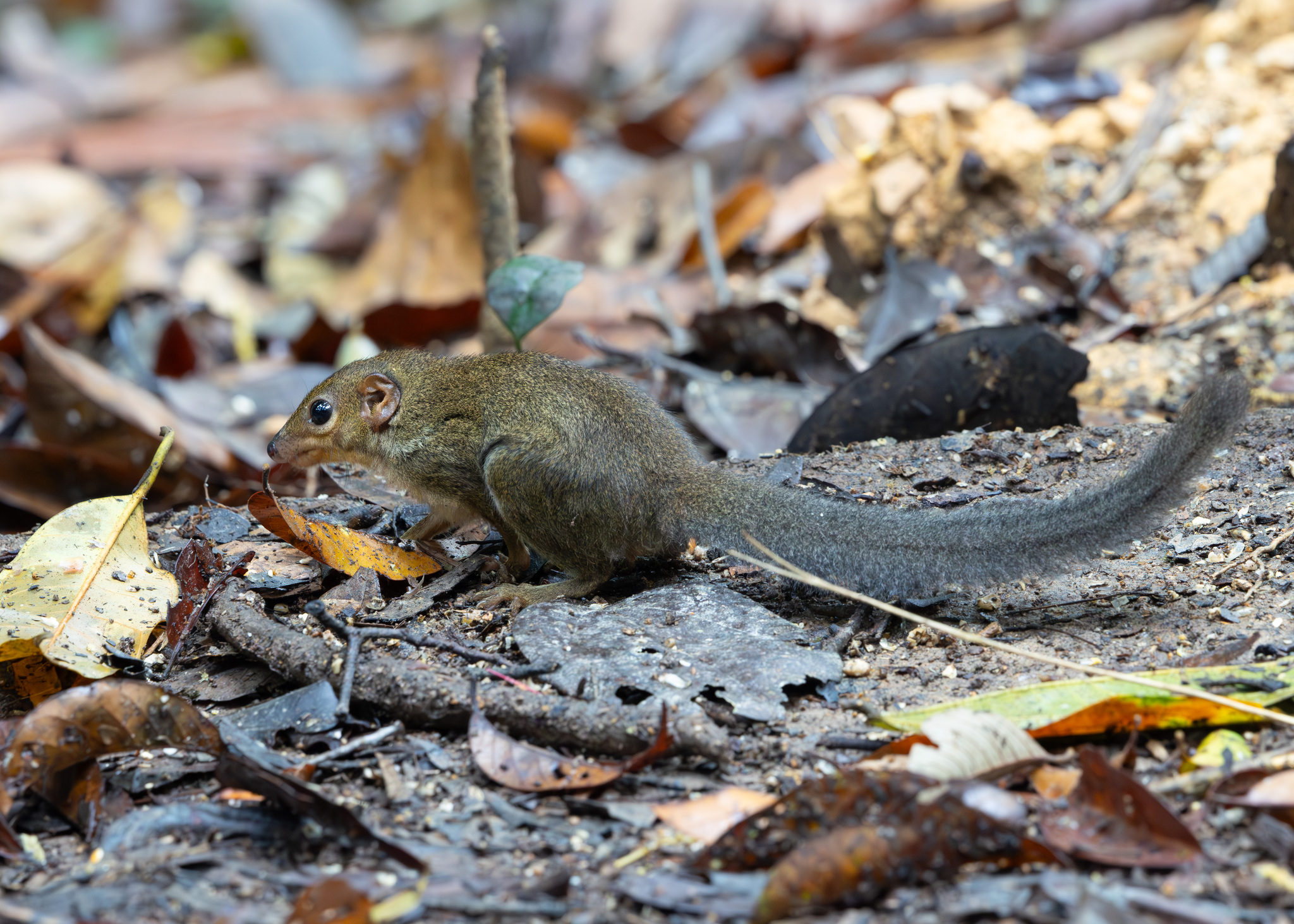

Conservation status
- Least Concern (IUCN 3.1)
- CITES Appendix II

Scientific classification
- Kingdom: Animalia
- Phylum: Chordata
- Class: Mammalia
- Order: Scandentia
- Family: Tupaiidae
- Genus: Tupaia
- Species: T. gracilis

Binomial name
- Tupaia gracilis Thomas, 1893
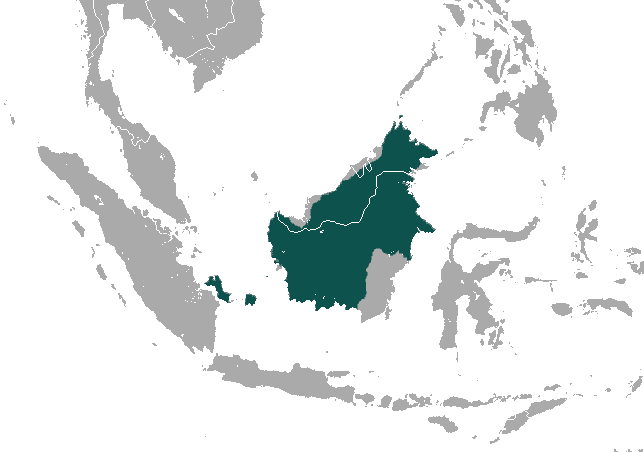
- Slender treeshrew range

= Slender treeshrew =

Species of mammal

The slender treeshrew (Tupaia gracilis) is a treeshrew species within the Tupaiidae. It is native to Borneo and inhabits foremost lowland old forest.

== Diet ==
The diet of the slender treeshrew consists mainly of fruits and insects. The species of fruit that the slender treeshrew was observed eating include: Alangium ebeneceum, Ficus benjamina, Ficus subulata, Dimocarpus longan, and one species of unidentified fig (Ficus). Caterpillars were observed to be the primary prey in the slender treeshrew's insect diet, with ants, and orthopterans being the next most common prey. A single arachnid was found in the droppings of a slender treeshrew, which suggests that it will prey on spiders, though not as much as other prey.

== Etymology ==
"Tupaia" is a latinized form of the Malay word, "Tupai," which means squirrel. "Gracilis" means "slender or thin," in Latin.
