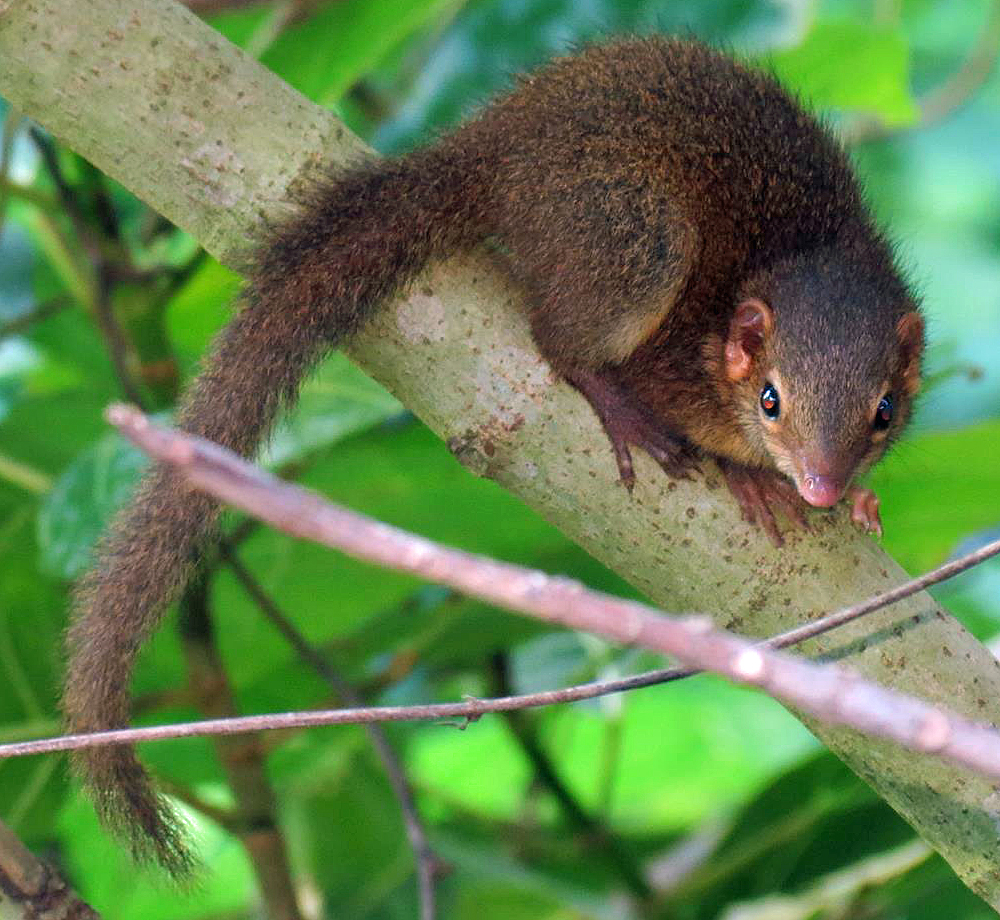

Conservation status
- Least Concern (IUCN 3.1)
- CITES Appendix II (CITES)

Scientific classification
- Kingdom: Animalia
- Phylum: Chordata
- Class: Mammalia
- Order: Scandentia
- Family: Tupaiidae
- Genus: Tupaia
- Species: T. javanica

Binomial name
- Tupaia javanica Horsfield, 1822
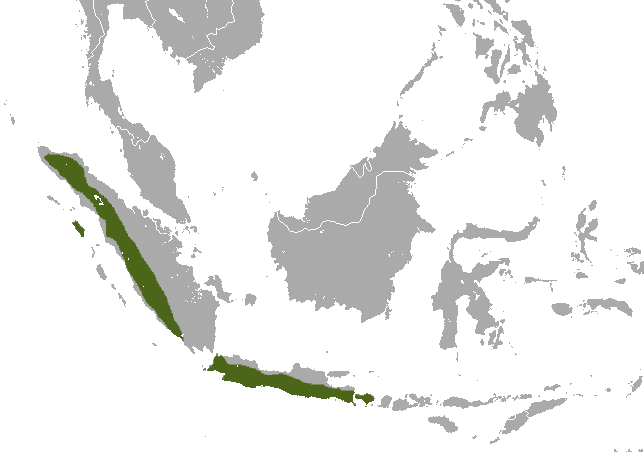
- Horsfield's treeshrew range

= Horsfield's treeshrew =

Species of mammal

Horsfield's treeshrew (Tupaia javanica), also called Javan treeshrew, is a treeshrew species within the Tupaiidae. It is endemic to the Indonesian islands of Sumatra, Bali, Java and Nias where it inhabits foremost primary forest.

It was first described by Thomas Horsfield in 1822. Several subspecies have been proposed based on variation in colouration; however, colour is an unreliable distinguishing character.

== Characteristics ==
There are many variations of papillae on the surface of the Horsfield's treeshrew's tongue, which depend on the food it eats as well as the pattern and function of its tongue. The Horsfield's treeshrew has a unique skull shape that better suits its environment and differs from other treeshrew species.

== Behavior and ecology ==
The Horsfield's treeshrew eats fruits and insects while mostly consuming arthropods. It spreads plants seeds and controls insects, and therefore plays a significant role in the ecosystem; it has a special ability to adapt to agroforestry systems.
