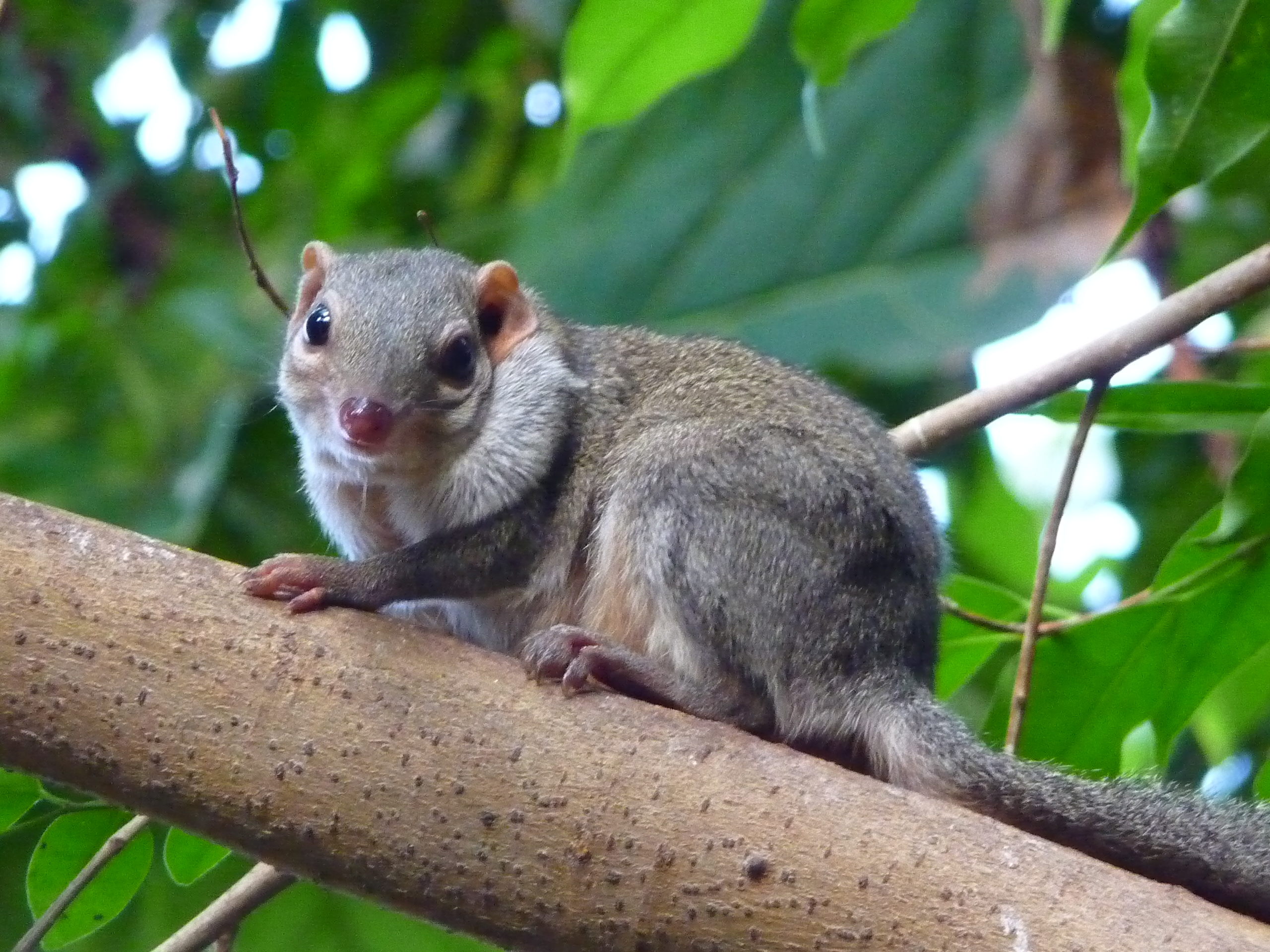
- Tupaia sp.
- CITES Appendix II

Scientific classification
- Kingdom: Animalia
- Phylum: Chordata
- Class: Mammalia
- Infraclass: Placentalia
- Grandorder: Euarchonta
- Order: Scandentia; Wagner, 1855

Families
- Tupaiidae; Ptilocercidae
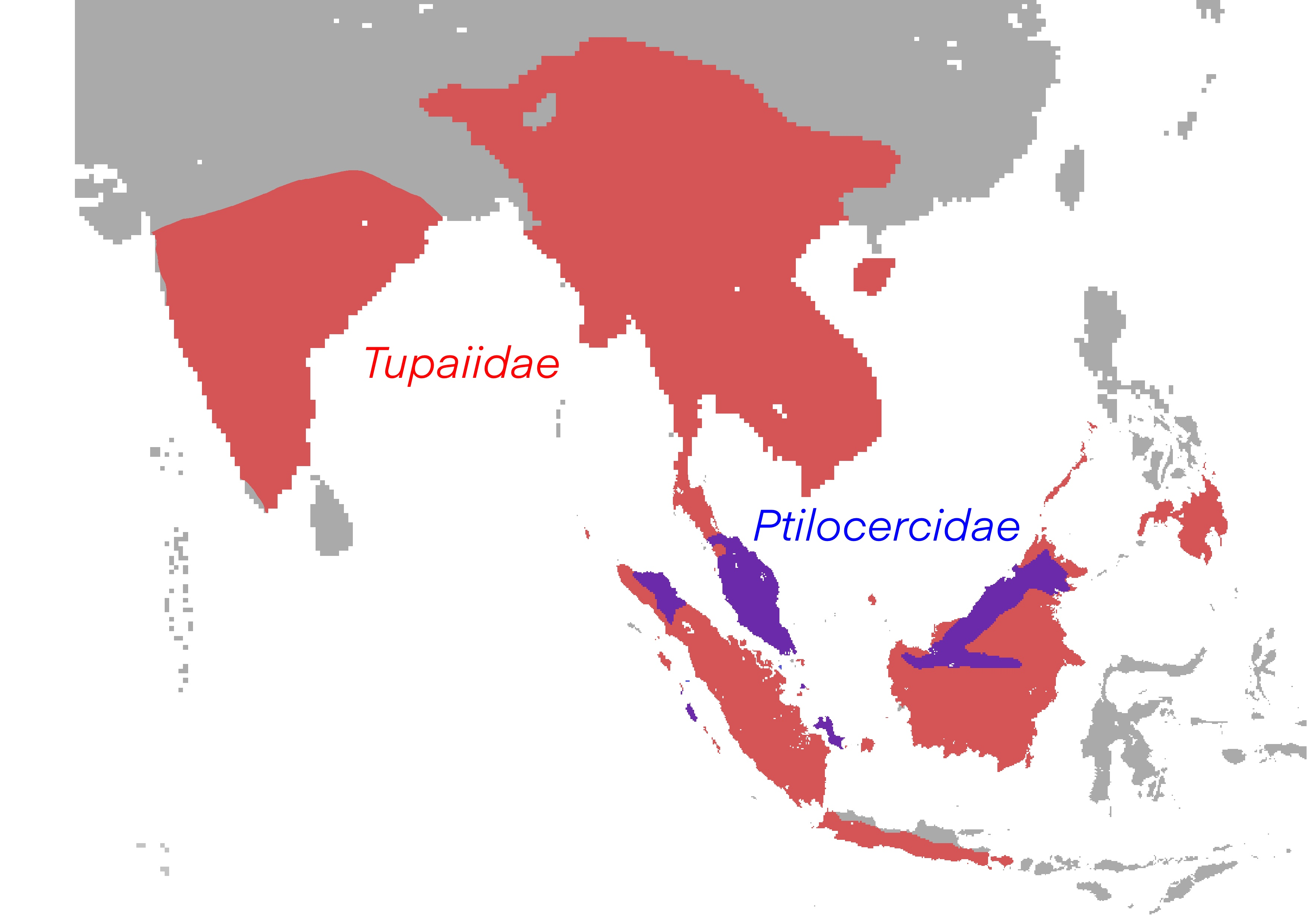
- Red: Tupaiidae, blue: Ptilocercidae, purple: both Tupaiidae and Ptilocercidae
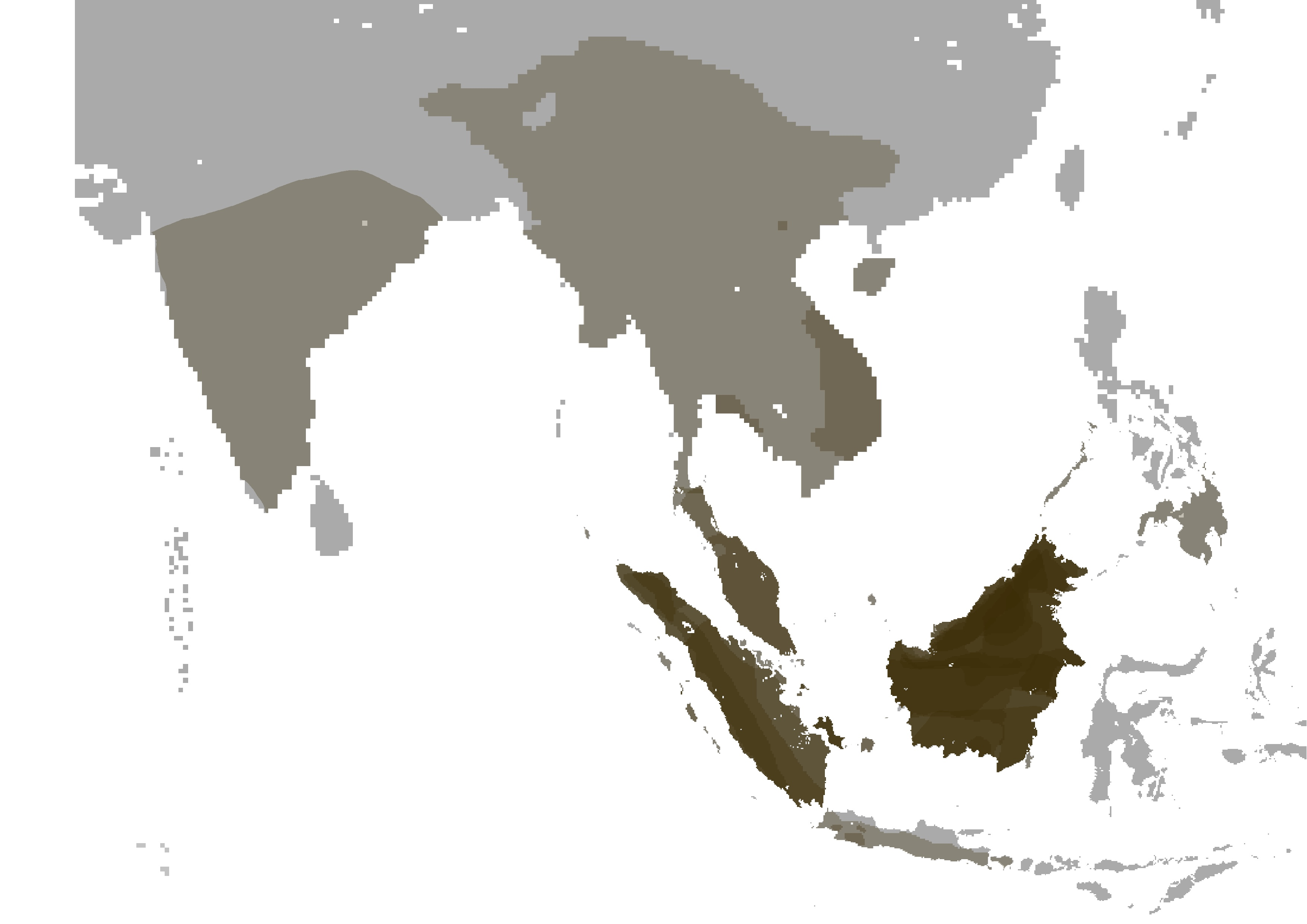
- The distribution and density of treeshrew species.

= Treeshrew =

Treeshrews Temporal range: Middle Eocene – Recent

Order of mammals

The treeshrews (also called tree shrews or banxrings) are small mammals native to the tropical forests of South and Southeast Asia. They make up the entire order Scandentia (/skænˈdɛn(t)ʃə/; from Latin scandere 'to climb'), which split into two families: the Tupaiidae (19 species, "ordinary" treeshrews), and the Ptilocercidae (one species, the pen-tailed treeshrew).

Though called 'treeshrews', and despite having previously been classified in Insectivora, they are not true shrews, and not all species live in trees. They are omnivores; among other things, treeshrews eat fruit. As fellow members of Euarchonta, treeshrews are closely related to primates, and have been used as an alternative to primates in experimental studies of myopia, psychosocial stress, and hepatitis.

== Description ==
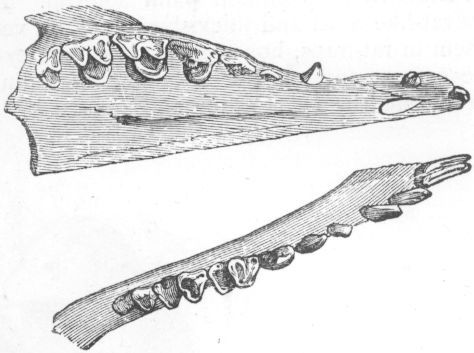
Dentition of Tupaia

Treeshrews are slender animals with long tails and soft, greyish to reddish-brown fur. The terrestrial species tend to be larger than the arboreal forms, and to have larger claws, which they use for digging up insect prey. They have poorly developed canine teeth and unspecialised molars, with an overall dental formula of 2.1.3.33.1.3.3 They have a higher brain to body mass ratio than any other mammal, including humans, but high ratios are not uncommon for animals weighing less than 1 kg (2 lb).

Treeshrews have good vision, which is binocular in the case of the more arboreal species.

== Reproduction ==
Female treeshrews have a gestation period of 45–50 days and give birth to up to three young in nests lined with dry leaves inside tree hollows. The young are born blind and hairless, but are able to leave the nest after about a month. During this period, the mother provides relatively little maternal care, visiting her young only for a few minutes every other day to suckle them.

Treeshrews reach sexual maturity after around four months, and breed for much of the year, with no clear breeding season in most species.

== Behavior ==
Treeshrews live in small family groups, which defend their territory from intruders. Most are diurnal, although the pen-tailed treeshrew is nocturnal.

They mark their territories using various scent glands or urine, depending on the particular species.

== Diet ==
Treeshrews are omnivorous, feeding on insects, small vertebrates, fruit, and seeds. Among other things, treeshrews eat Rafflesia fruit.

The pen-tailed treeshrew in Malaysia is able to consume large amounts of naturally fermented nectar from flower buds of the bertam palm Eugeissona tristis (with up to 3.8% alcohol content) the entire year without it having any effects on behaviour.

Treeshrews have also been observed intentionally eating foods high in capsaicin, a behavior unique among mammals other than humans. A single TRPV1 mutation reduces their pain response to capsaicinoids, which scientists believe is an evolutionary adaptation to be able to consume spicy foods in their natural habitats.

Bornean montane pitcher plant species like Nepenthes lowii supplement their carnivorous diet with tree shrew droppings, which provide essential nitrogen in a mutualistic relationship. The plants facilitate this behavior by producing excess edible exudates on a leaf surface most easily reachable with the treeshrew's hindquarters above the opening of the pitcher. This adaptation is seen in the mature plant's aerial pitchers, not in the terrestrial ones produced by both juvenile and adult plants.

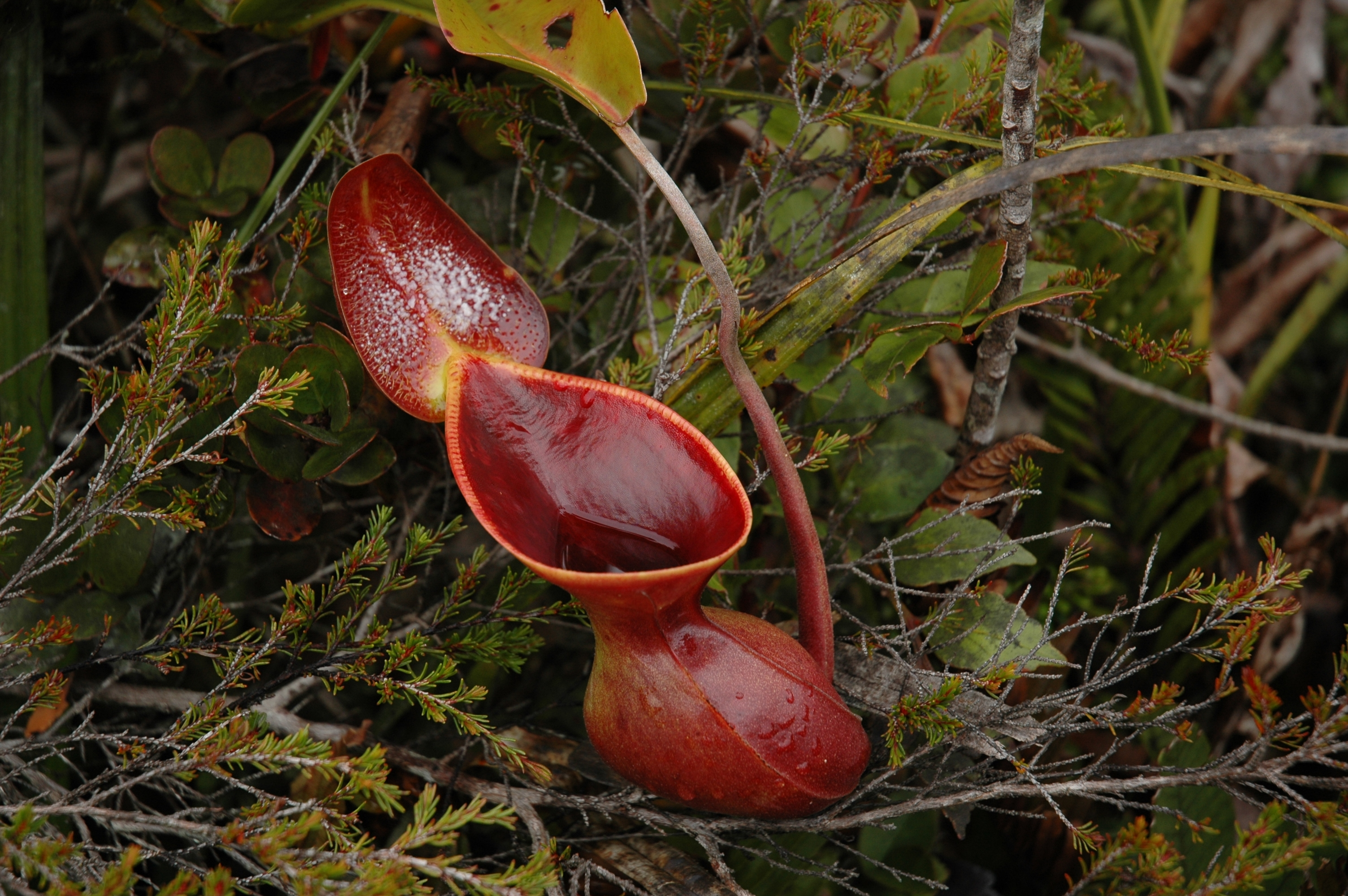
An upper pitcher of Nepenthes lowii

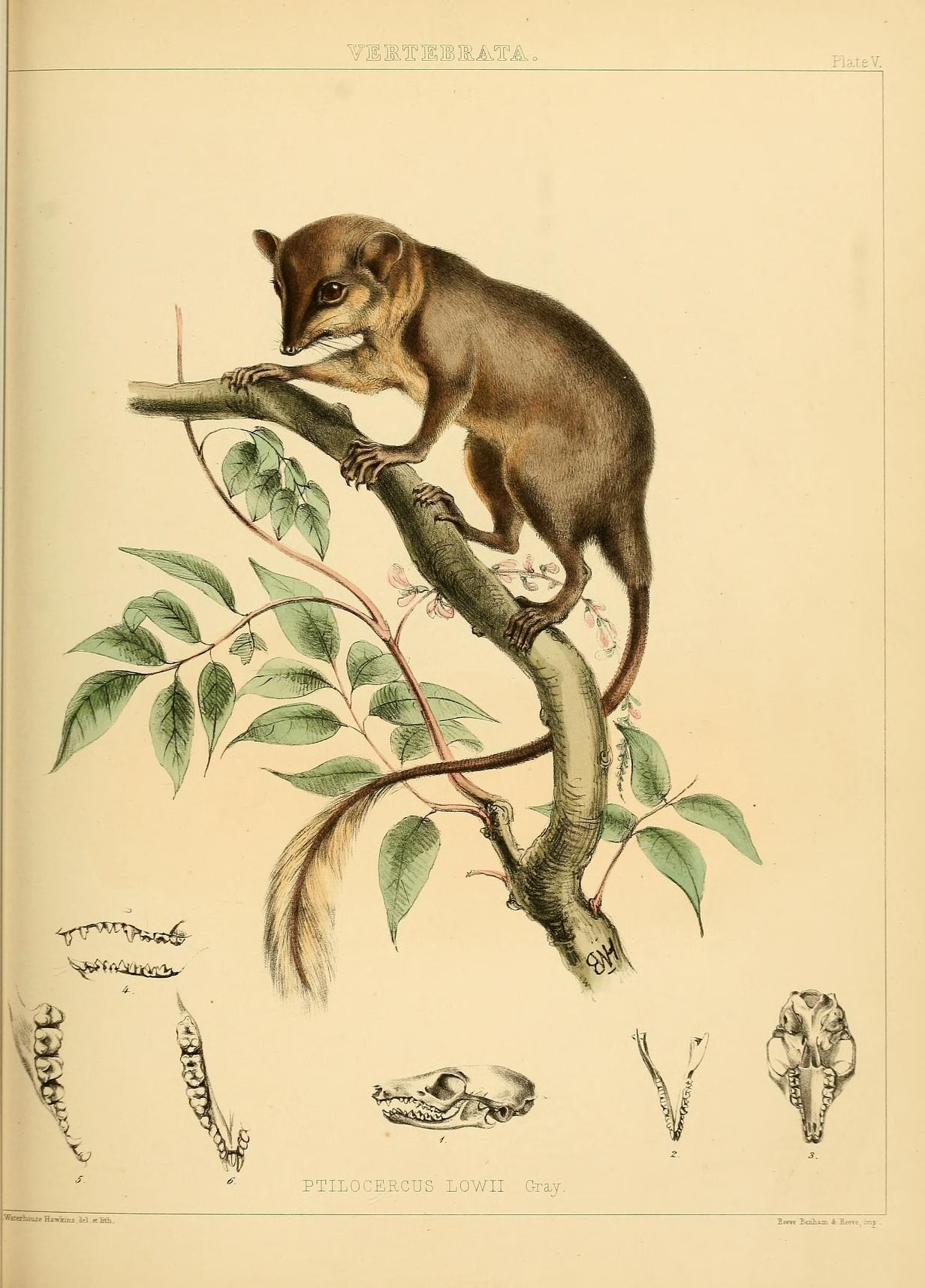
Pen-tailed treeshrew (1850 depiction of Ptilocercus lowii)

== Taxonomy ==
Treeshrews were moved from the order Insectivora into the order Primates because of certain internal similarities to primates (for example, similarities in the brain anatomy, highlighted by Sir Wilfrid Le Gros Clark), and classified as a "primitive prosimian", however they were soon split from the primates and moved into their own order. Taxonomists continue to refine the treeshrews' relations to primates and to other closely related clades.

Molecular phylogenetic studies have suggested that the treeshrews, with the primates and the flying lemurs (colugos), belong to the grandorder Euarchonta. According to this classification, the Euarchonta are sister to the Glires (lagomorphs and rodents), and the two groups are combined into the superorder Euarchontoglires. However, the alternative placement of treeshrews as sister to both Glires and Primatomorpha cannot be ruled out. Some studies place Scandentia as sister of the Glires, which would invalidate Euarchonta: it is this organization that is shown in the tree diagram below.

- Euarchontoglires
  - - Scandentia (treeshrews)
    - Glires
      - Lagomorpha (rabbits, hares, pikas)
      - Rodentia (rodents)
  - Primatomorpha
    - Dermoptera (colugos)
    - - †Plesiadapiformes
      - Primates

Several other arrangements of these orders have been proposed in the past, and the above tree is only one of several proposals. The exact phylogenetic position is not yet considered resolved: it may be a sister of Glires, Primatomorpha, or Dermoptera, or separate from and sister to all other Euarchontoglires. Shared short interspersed nuclear elements (SINEs) offer evidence for Scandentia belonging to the Euarchonta group:

- Euarchontoglires
  - Glires
    - Lagomorpha (rabbits, hares, pikas)
    - Rodentia (rodents)
  - Euarchonta
    - Scandentia (treeshrews)
    - Primatomorpha
      - - Dermoptera (colugos)
      - - Primates (†Plesiadapiformes, Strepsirrhini, Haplorrhini)

=== Order Scandentia ===
The 23 species are placed in four genera, which are divided into two families. The majority are in the "ordinary" treeshrew family, Tupaiidae, but one species, the pen-tailed treeshrew, is different enough to warrant placement in its own family, Ptilocercidae; the two families are thought to have separated 60 million years ago. The former Tupaiidae genus Urogale was disbanded in 2011 when the Mindanao treeshrew was moved to Tupaia based on a molecular phylogeny.

Family Tupaiidae

- Genus Anathana
  - Madras treeshrew, A. ellioti
- Genus Dendrogale
  - Bornean smooth-tailed treeshrew, D. melanura
  - Northern smooth-tailed treeshrew, D. murina
- Genus Tupaia
  - Northern treeshrew, T. belangeri
  - Golden-bellied treeshrew, T. chrysogaster
  - Bangka Island treeshrew, T. discolor
  - Striped treeshrew, T. dorsalis
  - Mindanao treeshrew, T. everetti
  - Sumatran treeshrew, T. ferruginea
  - Common treeshrew, T. glis
  - Slender treeshrew, T. gracilis
  - Javan treeshrew, T. hypochrysa
  - Horsfield's treeshrew, T. javanica
  - Long-footed treeshrew, T. longipes
  - Pygmy treeshrew, T. minor
  - Mountain treeshrew, T. montana
  - Nicobar treeshrew, T. nicobarica
  - Palawan treeshrew, T. palawanensis
  - Painted treeshrew, T. picta
  - Kalimantan treeshrew, T. salatana
  - Ruddy treeshrew, T. splendidula
  - Large treeshrew, T. tana

Family Ptilocercidae

- Genus Ptilocercus
  - Pen-tailed treeshrew, P. lowii
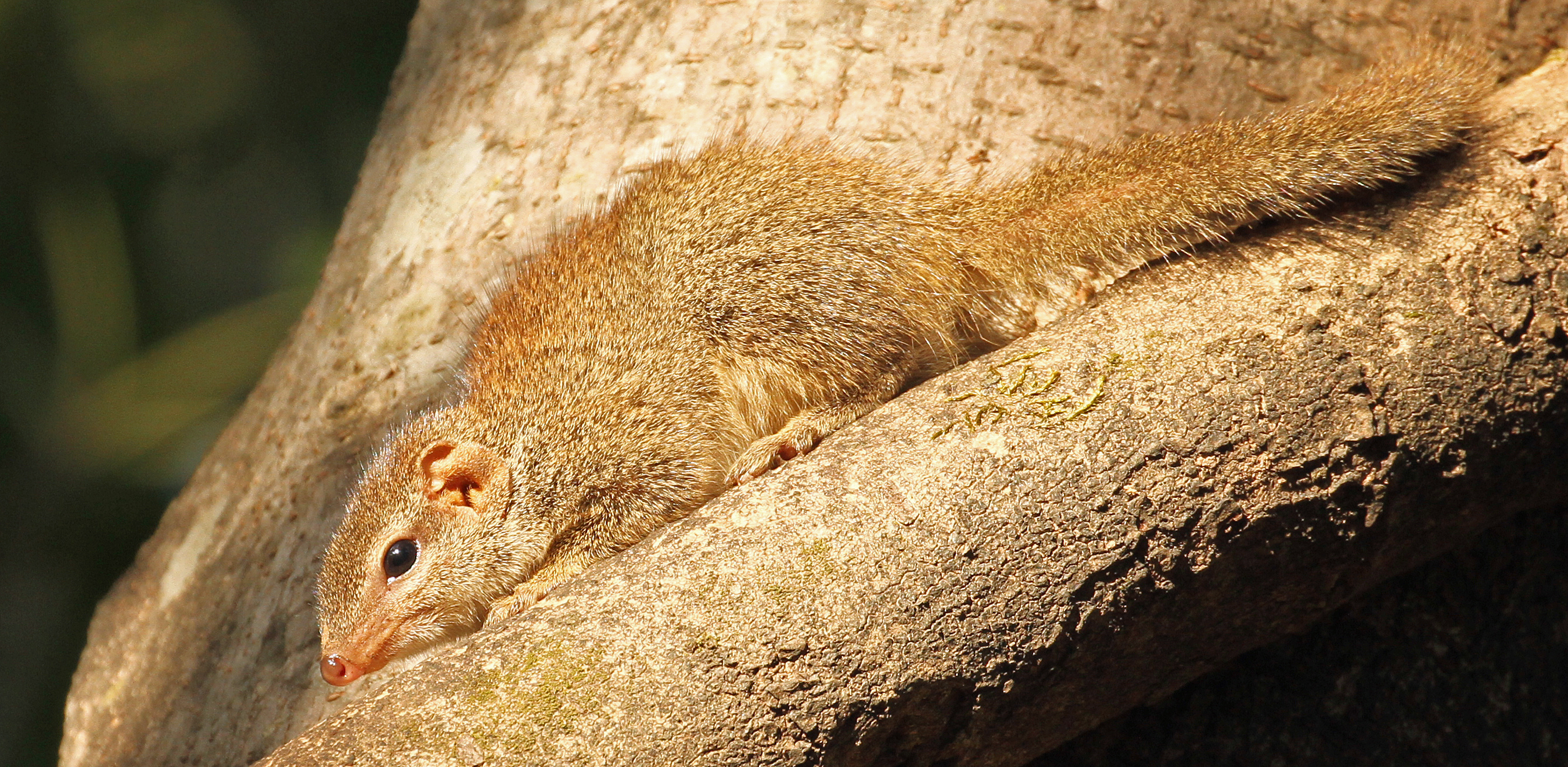
Madras treeshrew (Anathana ellioti)

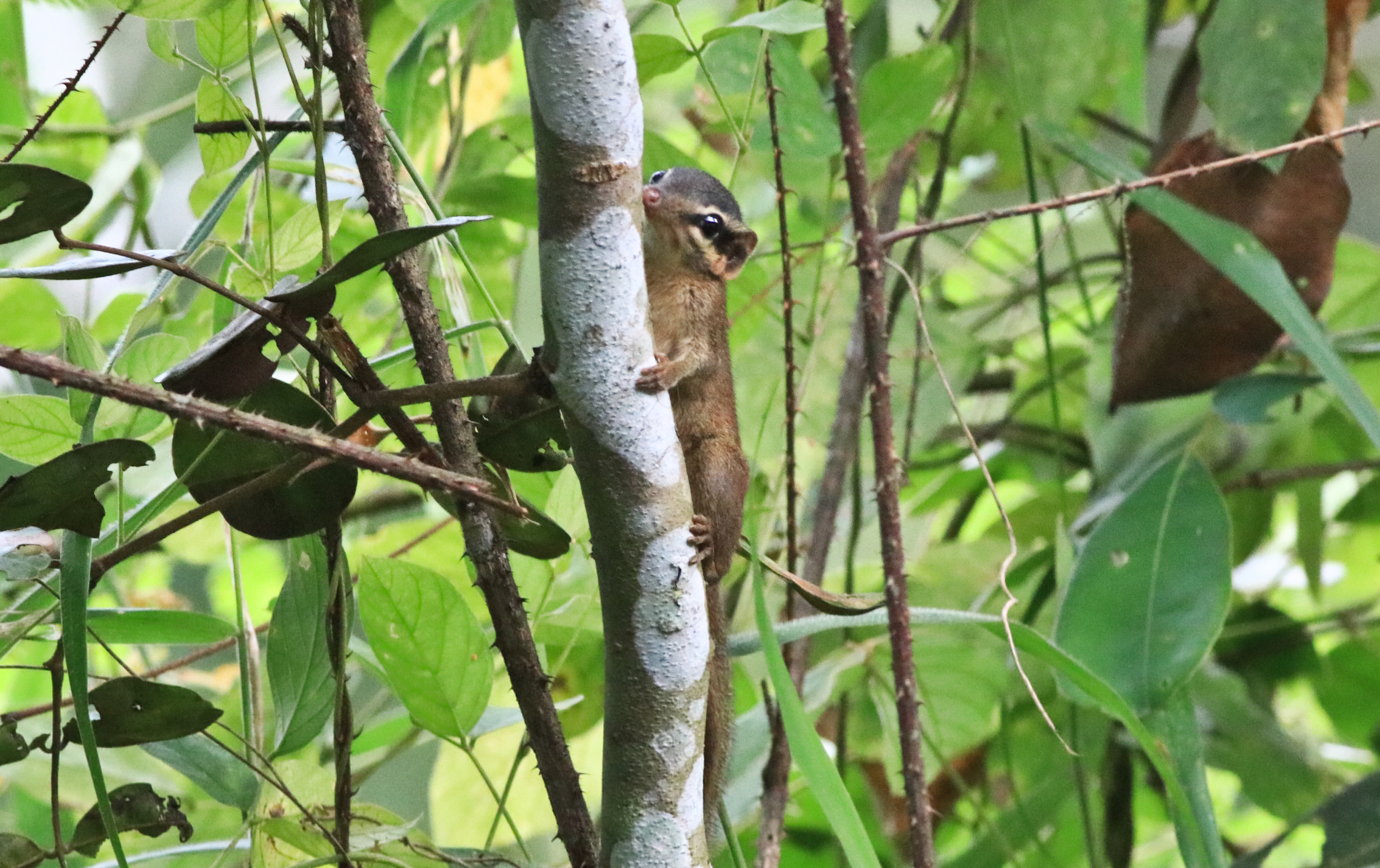
Northern smooth-tailed treeshrew (Dendrogale murina)

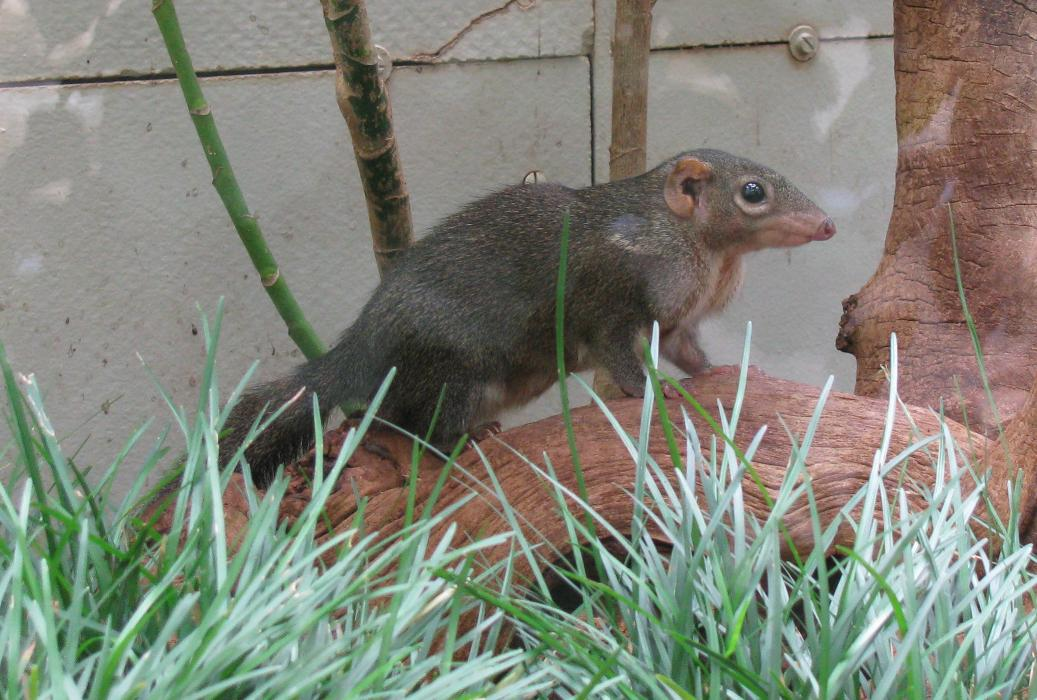
Northern treeshrew (Tupaia belangeri)

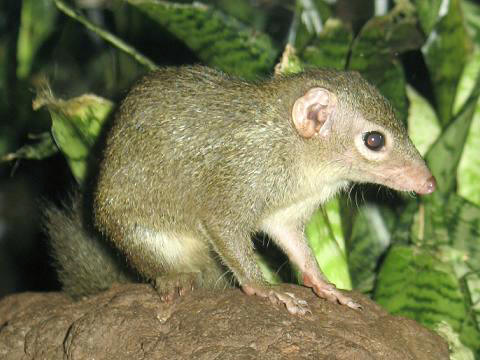
Common treeshrew (T. glis)

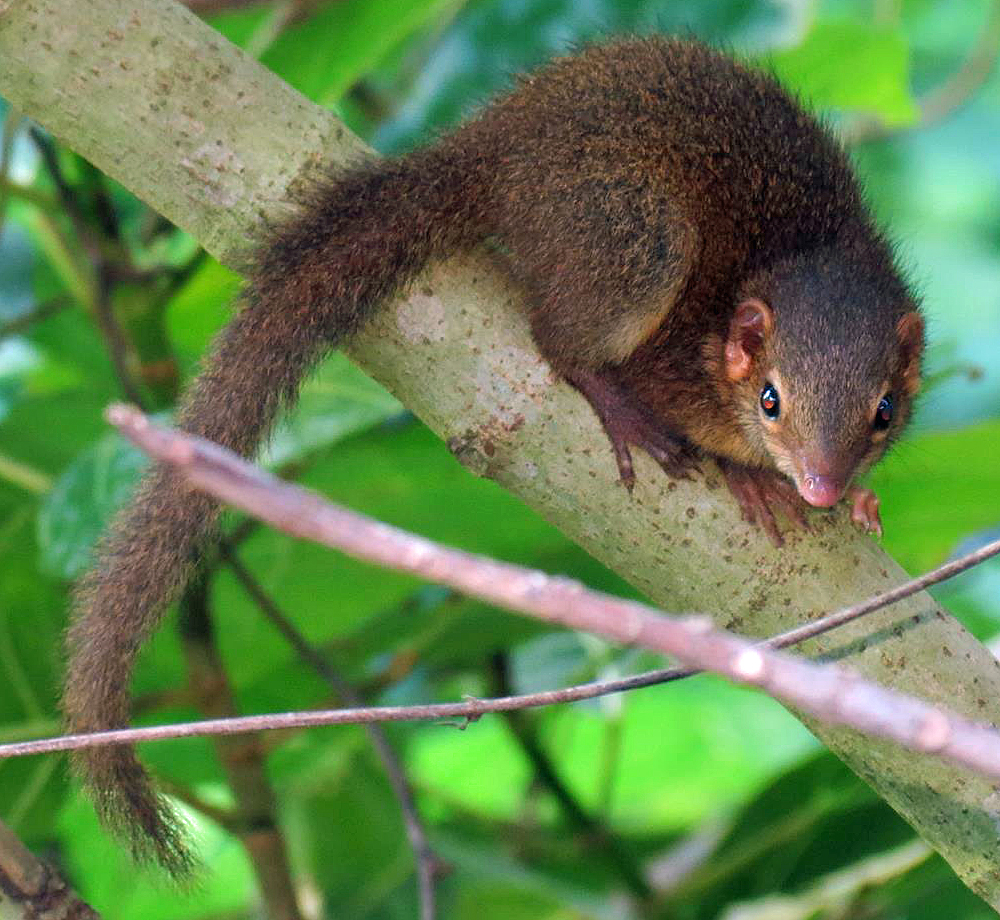
Horsfield's treeshrew (T. javanica)

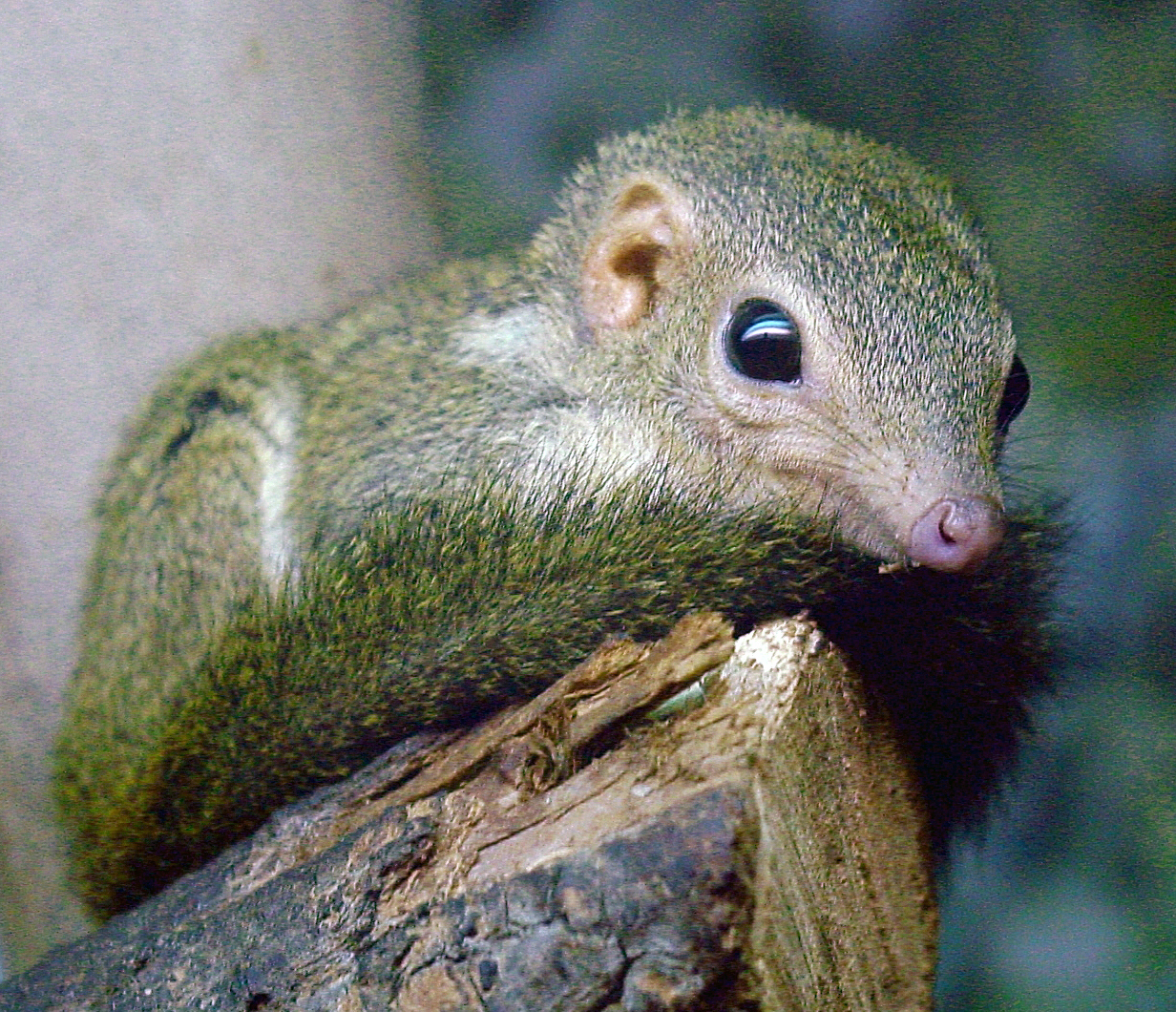
Pygmy treeshrew (T. minor)

== Fossil record ==
The fossil record of treeshrews is poor. The oldest putative treeshrew, Eodendrogale parva, is from the Middle Eocene of Henan, China, but the identity of this animal is uncertain. Other fossils have come from the Miocene of Thailand, Pakistan, India, and Yunnan, China, as well as the Pliocene of India. Most belong to the family Tupaiidae; one fossil species described from the Oligocene of Yunnan is thought to be closer to the pen-tailed treeshrew.

Named fossil species include Prodendrogale yunnanica, Prodendrogale engesseri, and Tupaia storchi from Yunnan, Tupaia miocenica from Thailand, Palaeotupaia sivalicus from India and Ptilocercus kylin from Yunnan.

== See also ==
- Purgatorius
- Shrew-faced squirrel
