= Ptilocercus kylin =

Ptilocercus kylin Temporal range: Early Oligocene

Scientific classification
- Kingdom: Animalia
- Phylum: Chordata
- Class: Mammalia
- Infraclass: Placentalia
- Order: Scandentia
- Family: Ptilocercidae
- Genus: Ptilocercus
- Species: †P. kylin

Binomial name
- †Ptilocercus kylin Li & Ni, 2016

Extinct species of treeshrew

Ptilocercus kylin is an extinct species of Ptilocercus that lived during the Rupelian stage of the Oligocene epoch.

== Distribution ==
Ptilocercus kylin is known from the Lijiawa Mammalian Fossil locality of China.
