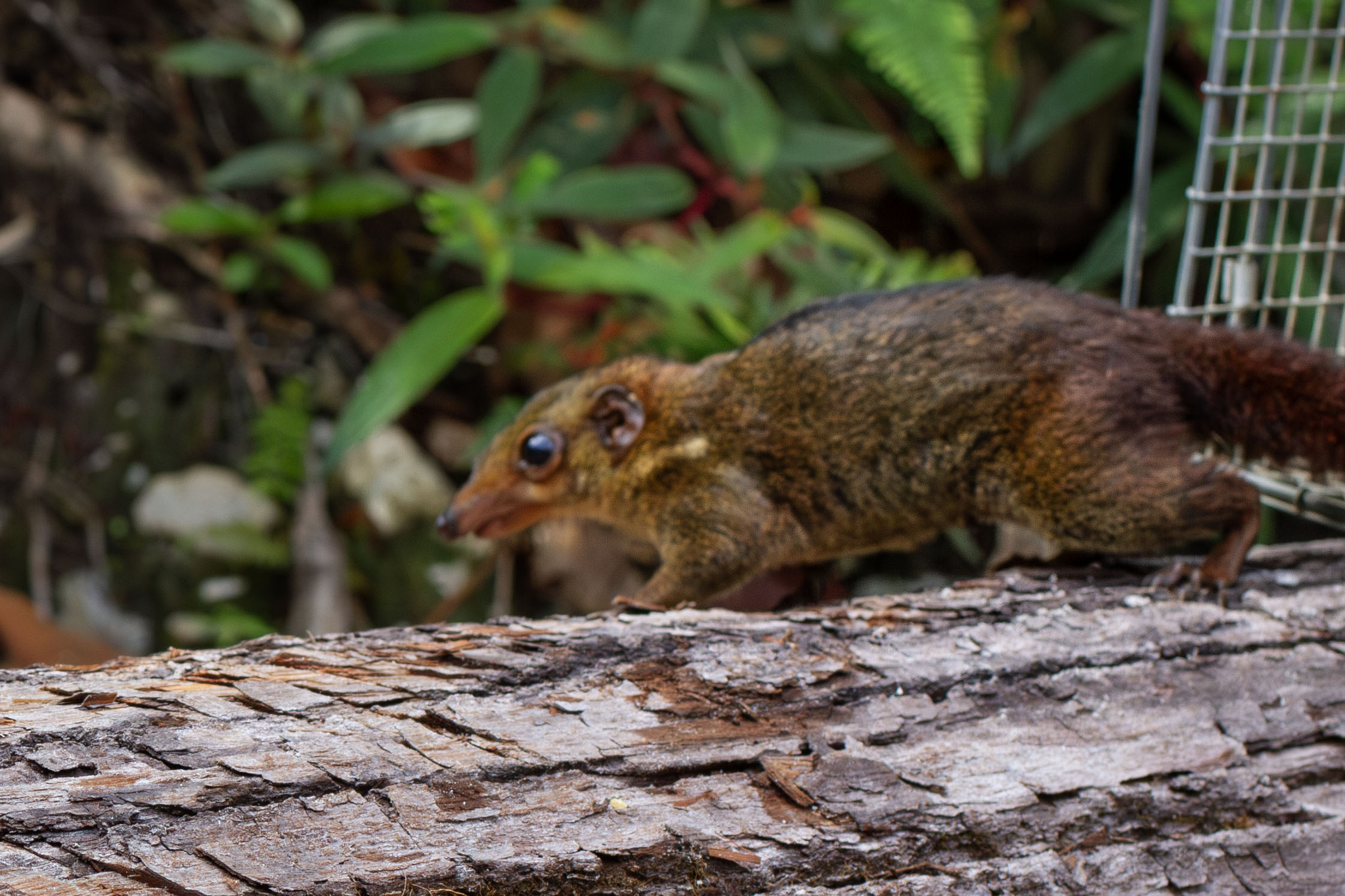

Conservation status
- Least Concern (IUCN 3.1)
- CITES Appendix II

Scientific classification
- Kingdom: Animalia
- Phylum: Chordata
- Class: Mammalia
- Order: Scandentia
- Family: Tupaiidae
- Genus: Tupaia
- Species: T. picta

Binomial name
- Tupaia picta Thomas, 1892
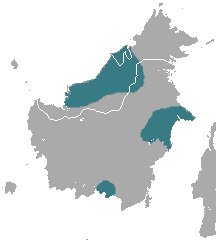
- Painted treeshrew range

= Painted treeshrew =

Species of mammal

The painted treeshrew (Tupaia picta) is a treeshrew species of the family Tupaiidae.

The first specimen was described by Oldfield Thomas and was part of a zoological collection from northern Borneo obtained by the British Museum of Natural History.

== Characteristics ==
The painted treeshrew has a body length of a little bit over 18 cm (7 in) and a slightly shorter tail length, making it one of the smaller treeshrews in its genus. Most of its body is a rather dull color compared to other related species, consisting of mostly grayish olive, with a few yellow spots. However, its chin and chest are brighter colored, consisting of mostly orange and yellow. It also has a black stripe on its back.

== Distribution and habitat ==
The painted treeshrew is endemic to Borneo and inhabits the forests of Brunei, Kalimantan, and Sarawak. It usually lives at lower elevations, below 300 metres (980 ft), but some specimens have been found at elevations hundreds of meters higher. Although the painted treeshrew is not a threatened species, it still suffers from loss of habitat.

== Behaviour and ecology ==
The painted treeshrew's diet consists mainly of fruits and insects.
