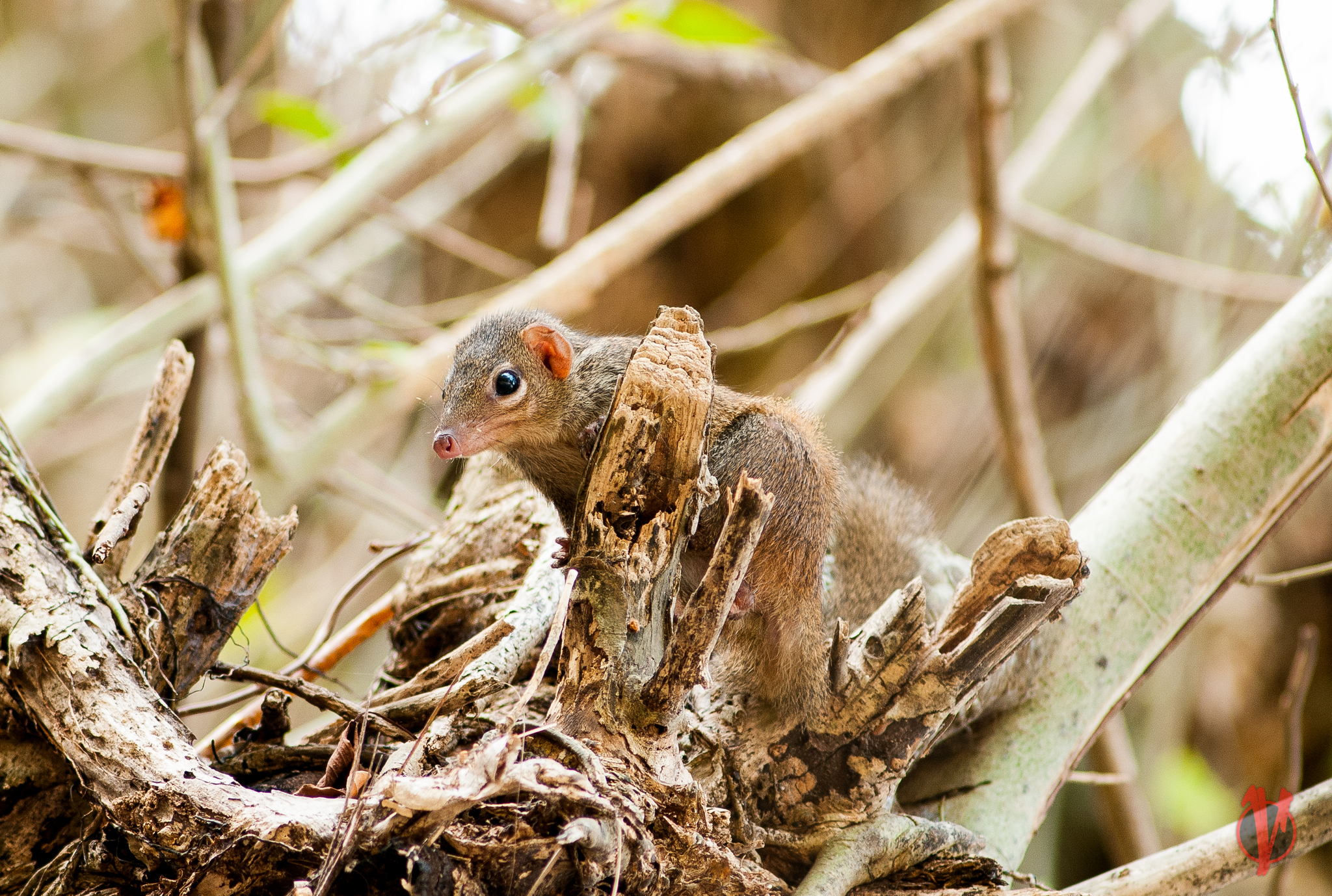

Conservation status
- Least Concern (IUCN 3.1)
- CITES Appendix II

Scientific classification
- Kingdom: Animalia
- Phylum: Chordata
- Class: Mammalia
- Order: Scandentia
- Family: Tupaiidae
- Genus: Tupaia
- Species: T. belangeri

Binomial name
- Tupaia belangeri (Wagner, 1841)

Subspecies
- Tupaia belangeri belangeri (Wagner, 1841); Tupaia belangeri chinensis Anderson, 1879
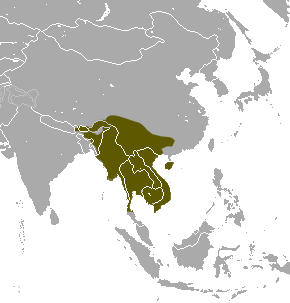
- Northern treeshrew range

= Northern treeshrew =

Species of mammal

The northern treeshrew (Tupaia belangeri) is a treeshrew species native to Southeast Asia.

In 1841, the German zoologist Johann Andreas Wagner first used the specific name Cladobates belangeri for treeshrews that had been collected in Pegu during a French expedition to Southeast Asia. These specimens were described by Isidore Geoffroy Saint-Hilaire in 1834 in whose opinion they did not differ sufficiently from Tupaia tana to assign a specific rank.

== Characteristics ==
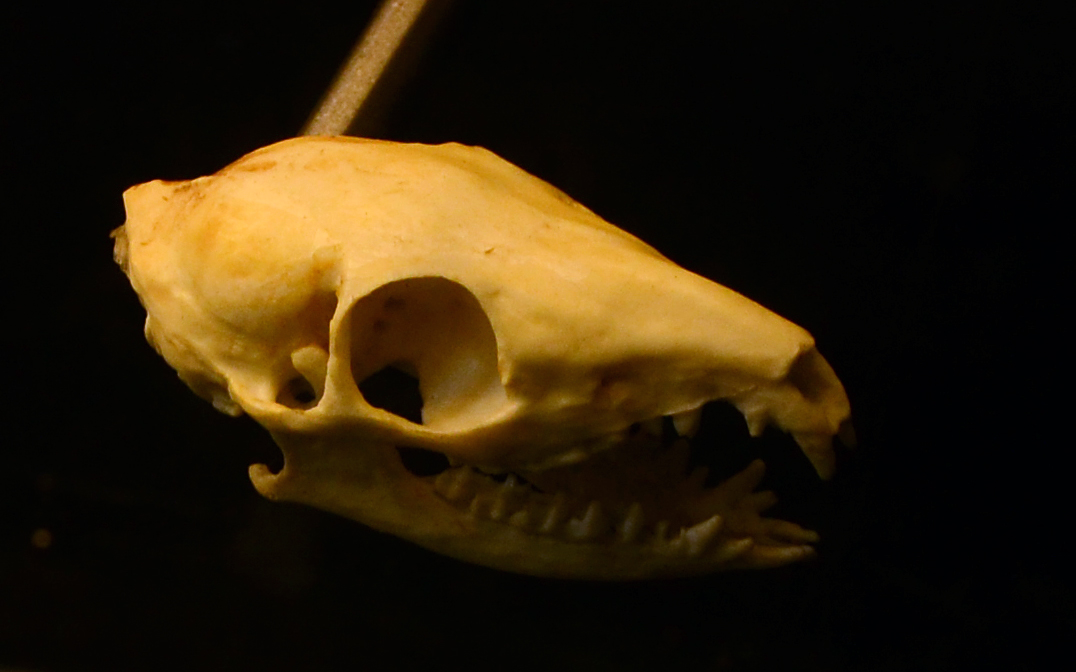
Skull of a northern treeshrew

Results of a telemetry study involving northern treeshrews showed that their body temperature varies from 35 °C (95 °F) during the night to 40 °C (104 °F) during the day. This difference is larger than in other endotherms, and indicates that the circadian rhythms of body temperature and locomotor activity are synchronized.

Adults weigh 0.2 kg (0.44 lb). The maximum longevity of the northern treeshrew is 11 years.

Besides humans, the northern treeshrew is the only mammal known to willingly consume spicy food. This is due to a genetic mutation rendering it much less sensitive to the effects of capsaicin.

== Phylogeny ==
Complete mitochondrial genome data support the hypothesis of a closer phylogenetic relationship of Tupaia to rabbits than to primates. This is however disputed by the more recent full genome sequencing data that places the species closer to primates (divergence ~90.9 million years ago) than to lagomorphs and rodents (~96.4 Million years ago).

== In medical research ==
The northern treeshrew has attained growing interest for use as a medical model. In 2002, an article was published describing that its primary hepatocytes could be used as a model for studying the hepatitis C virus, which is a major cause of chronic hepatitis worldwide. It was also used in studies on the development of photo reception, investigation of retinal cones, and refractive state and ocular component dimensions of the eye. Many studies have been conducted regarding eye structure, development, and vision using the northern treeshrew model because of the similarity to human eye structure and sight that is uncharacteristic of conventional small lab animals, such as rodents.
