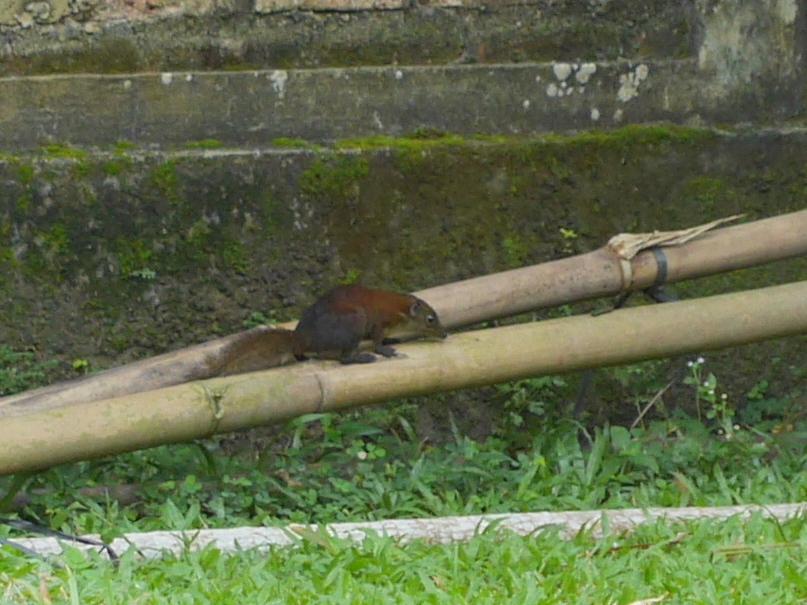
- Sumatran treeshrew (Tupaia ferruginea)

Conservation status
- Data Deficient (IUCN 3.1)

Scientific classification
- Kingdom: Animalia
- Phylum: Chordata
- Class: Mammalia
- Order: Scandentia
- Family: Tupaiidae
- Genus: Tupaia
- Species: T. ferruginea

Binomial name
- Tupaia ferruginea Raffles, 1821
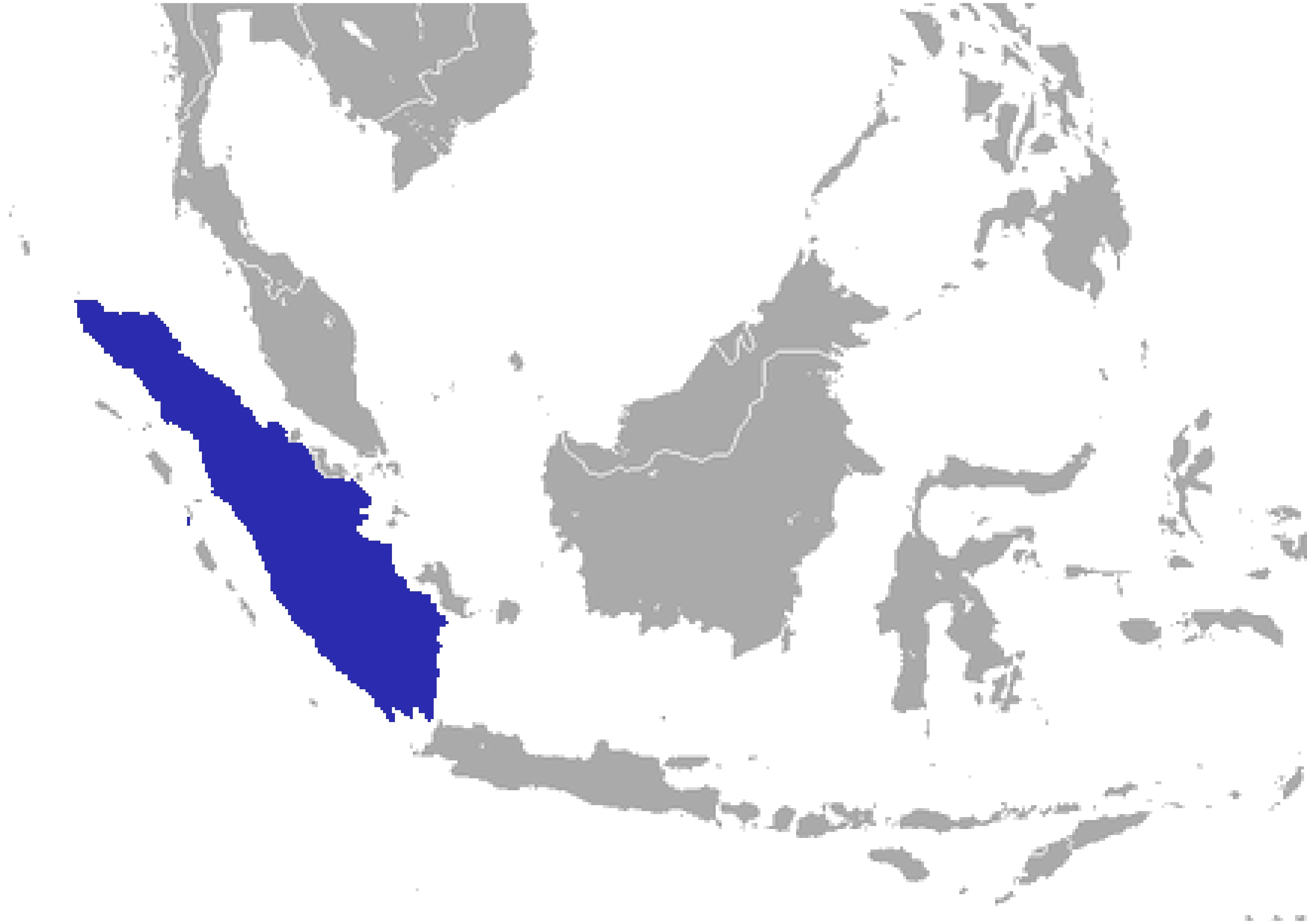

Synonyms
- tephrura Miller, 1903

= Sumatran treeshrew =

Species of mammal

The Sumatran treeshrew (Tupaia ferruginea) is a treeshrew species within the Tupaiidae family. It was previously listed as a subspecies of Tupaia glis for one hundred years, but was raised up to species status in 2013. It is found on the islands of Sumatra and Tanahbala in Indonesia. It is the type species for the Tupaia genus.
