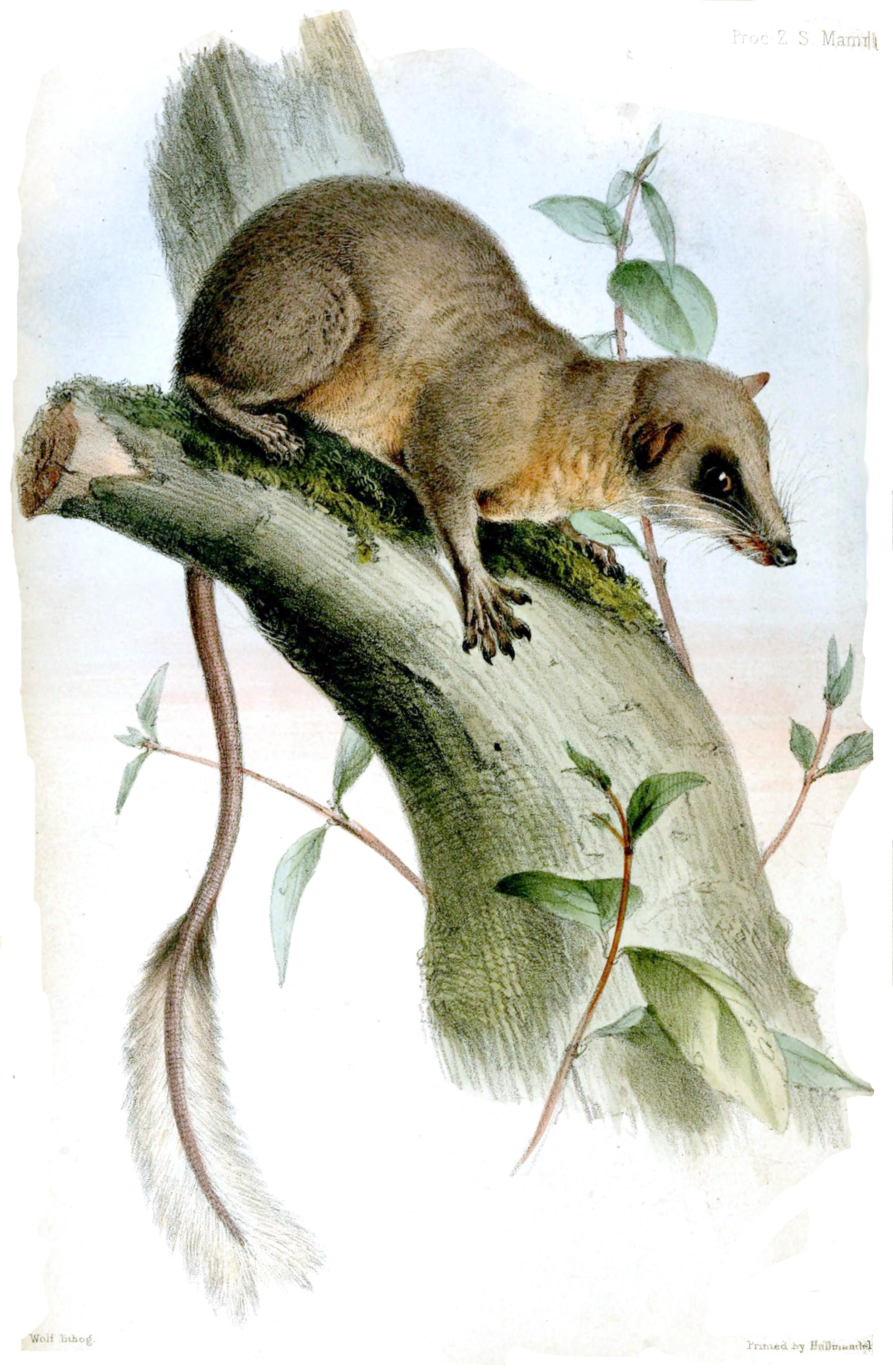
- Pen-tailed treeshrew (Ptilocercus lowii)

Scientific classification
- Kingdom: Animalia
- Phylum: Chordata
- Class: Mammalia
- Order: Scandentia
- Family: Ptilocercidae; Lyon, 1913
- Genus: Ptilocercus; J. E. Gray, 1848

Type species
- Ptilocercus lowii J. E. Gray, 1848

Species
- Ptilocercus lowii; †Ptilocercus kylin

= Ptilocercus =

Ptilocercus Temporal range: 34–0 Ma Early Oligocene - Present

Genus of mammals

Ptilocercus is a genus of treeshrew and the sole member of the family Ptilocercidae.

== Taxonomy ==
Today the genus (and family) is represented by a single species, the pen-tailed treeshrew (Ptilocercus lowii). However, this genus is very ancient and considered the most primitive of all the treeshrews. In 2016 a new species was described from China dated to the Early Oligocene about 34 million years ago. This species, Ptilocercus kylin, is so strikingly similar to the living species that it can be considered a sister taxa. This suggests that the Ptilocercidae have evolved little change over millions of years.
