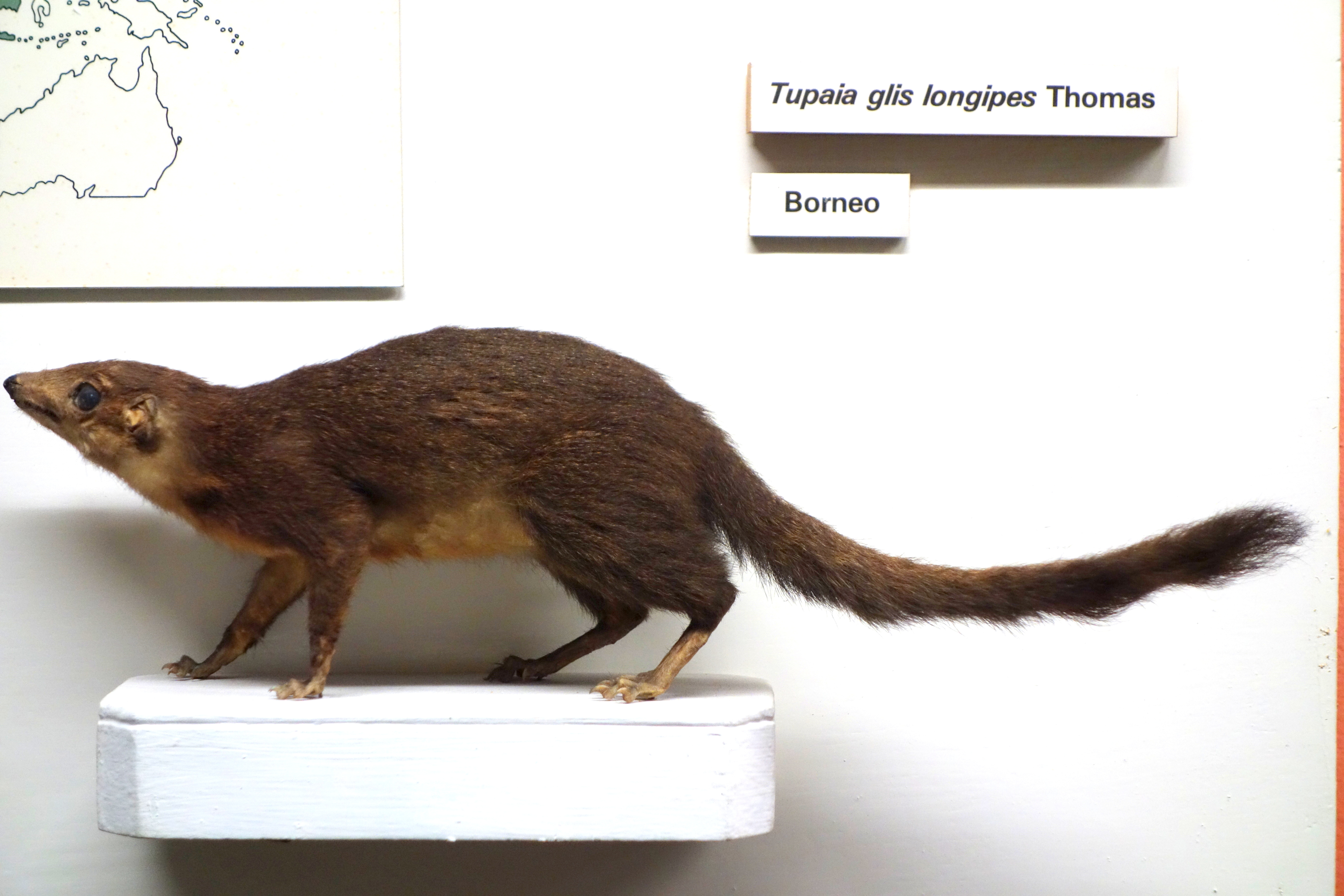

Conservation status
- Least Concern (IUCN 3.1)
- CITES Appendix II (CITES)

Scientific classification
- Kingdom: Animalia
- Phylum: Chordata
- Class: Mammalia
- Order: Scandentia
- Family: Tupaiidae
- Genus: Tupaia
- Species: T. longipes

Binomial name
- Tupaia longipes Thomas, 1893
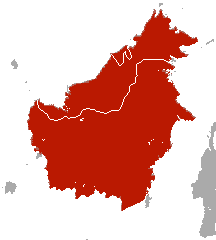
- Long-footed treeshrew range

= Long-footed treeshrew =

Species of mammal

The long-footed treeshrew (Tupaia longipes) is a treeshrew species within the Tupaiidae. It is endemic to Borneo and threatened due to deforestation and degradation of habitat.
