= List of mammals of the Balearic Islands =

All three land mammal species once endemic to the Balearic Islands, Spain (the Majorcan giant dormouse, the Balearic shrew and the goat-like ruminant Myotragus balearicus) are currently extinct, while those presently found on the archipelago have been introduced voluntarily or accidentally by humans in colonization waves beginning in the Neolithic.

The following tags are used to highlight each species' conservation status as assessed by the International Union for Conservation of Nature.

EX	Extinct	No reasonable doubt that the last individual has died.
EW	Extinct in the wild	Known only to survive in captivity or as a naturalised population well outside its previous range.
CR	Critically endangered	The species is in imminent risk of extinction in the wild.
EN	Endangered	The species is facing an extremely high risk of extinction in the wild.
VU	Vulnerable	The species is facing a high risk of extinction in the wild.
NT	Near threatened	The species does not meet any of the criteria that would categorise it as risking extinction but it is likely to in the future.
LC	Least concern	There are no current identifiable risks to the species.
DD	Data deficient	There is inadequate information to make an assessment of the risks to this species.

== Order: Rodentia (rodents) ==
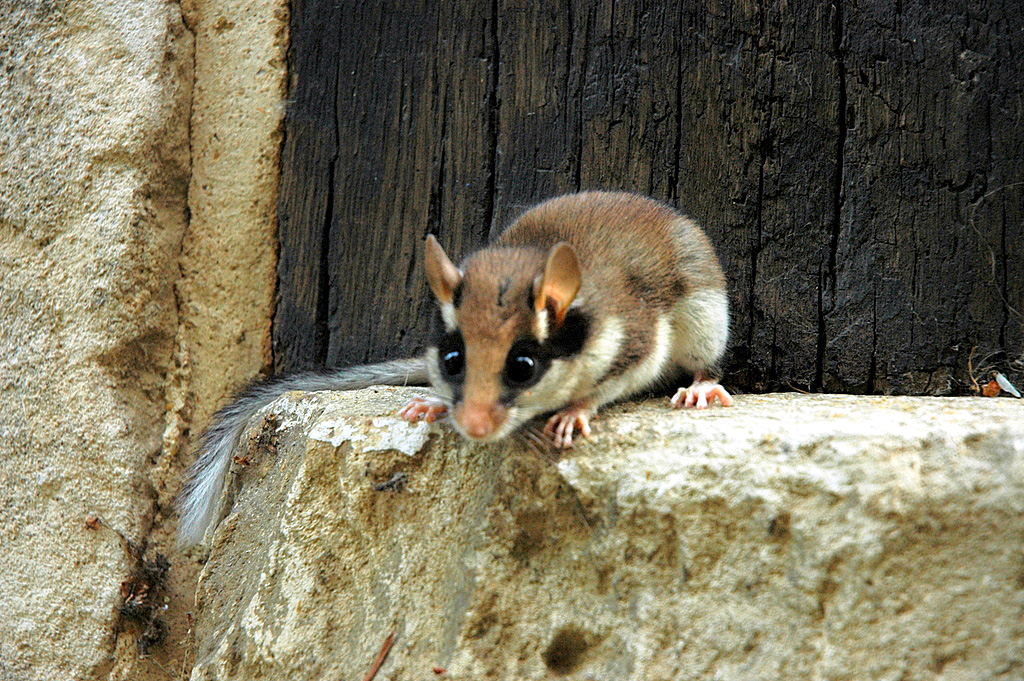
Garden dormouse

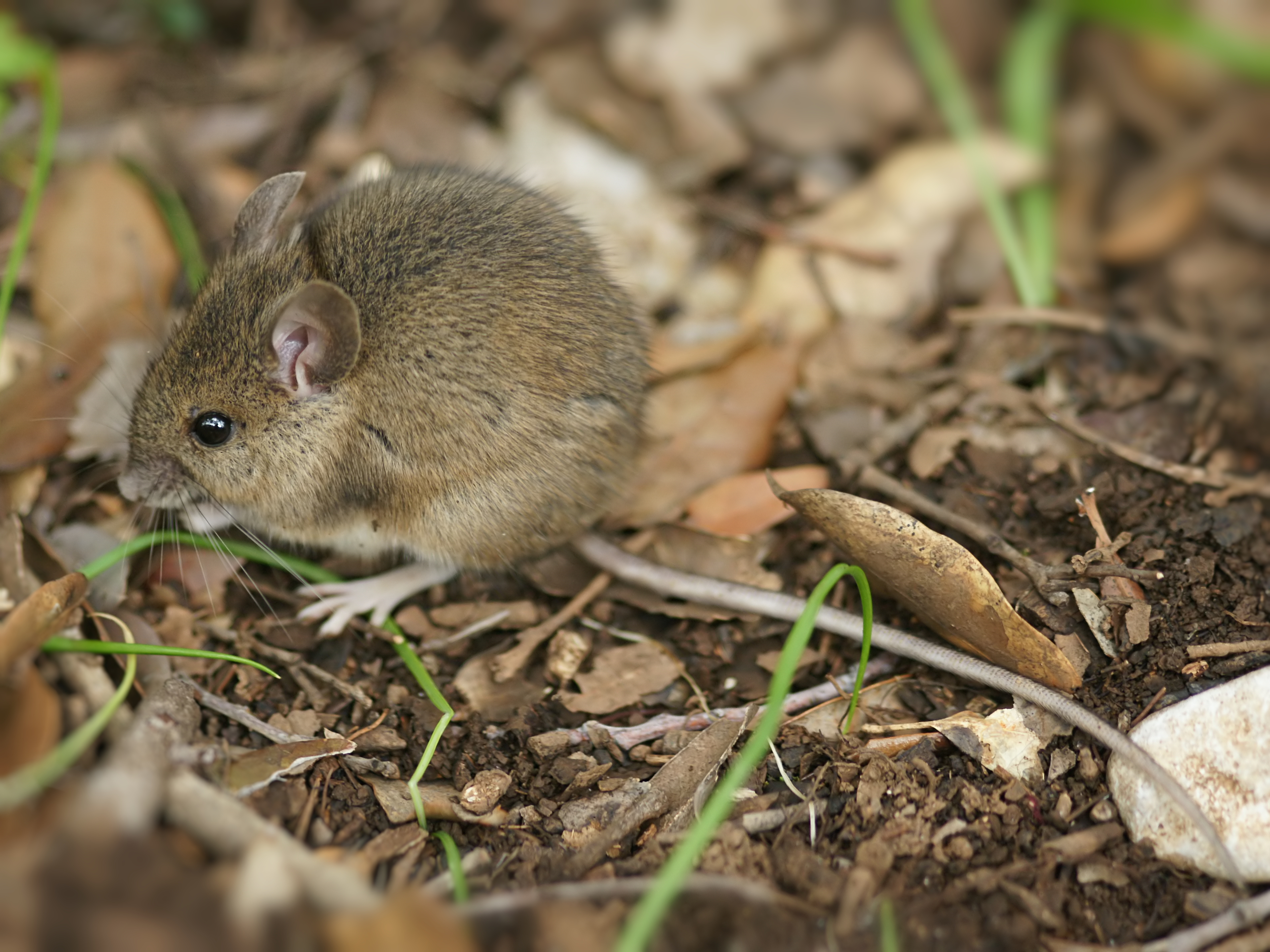
Wood mouse

Rodents make up the largest order of mammals, with over 40% of mammalian species. They have two incisors in the upper and lower jaw which grow continually and must be kept short by gnawing. Most rodents are small though the capybara can weigh up to 45 kg (99 lb).

- Suborder: Sciuromorpha
  - Family: Gliridae (dormice)
    - Subfamily: Leithiinae
      - Genus: Eliomys
        - Garden dormouse, E. quercinus LC introduced
      - Genus: Hypnomys
        - Mallorcan giant dormouse, H. morpheus EX
- Suborder: Myomorpha
  - Family: Muridae (mice and rats)
    - Subfamily: Murinae
      - Genus: Apodemus
        - Wood mouse, A. sylvaticus LC introduced
      - Genus: Mus
        - House mouse, M. musculus LC introduced
        - Algerian mouse, M. spretus LC introduced
      - Genus: Rattus
        - Black rat, R. rattus LC introduced
        - Brown rat, R. norvegicus LC introduced

== Order: Lagomorpha (lagomorphs) ==
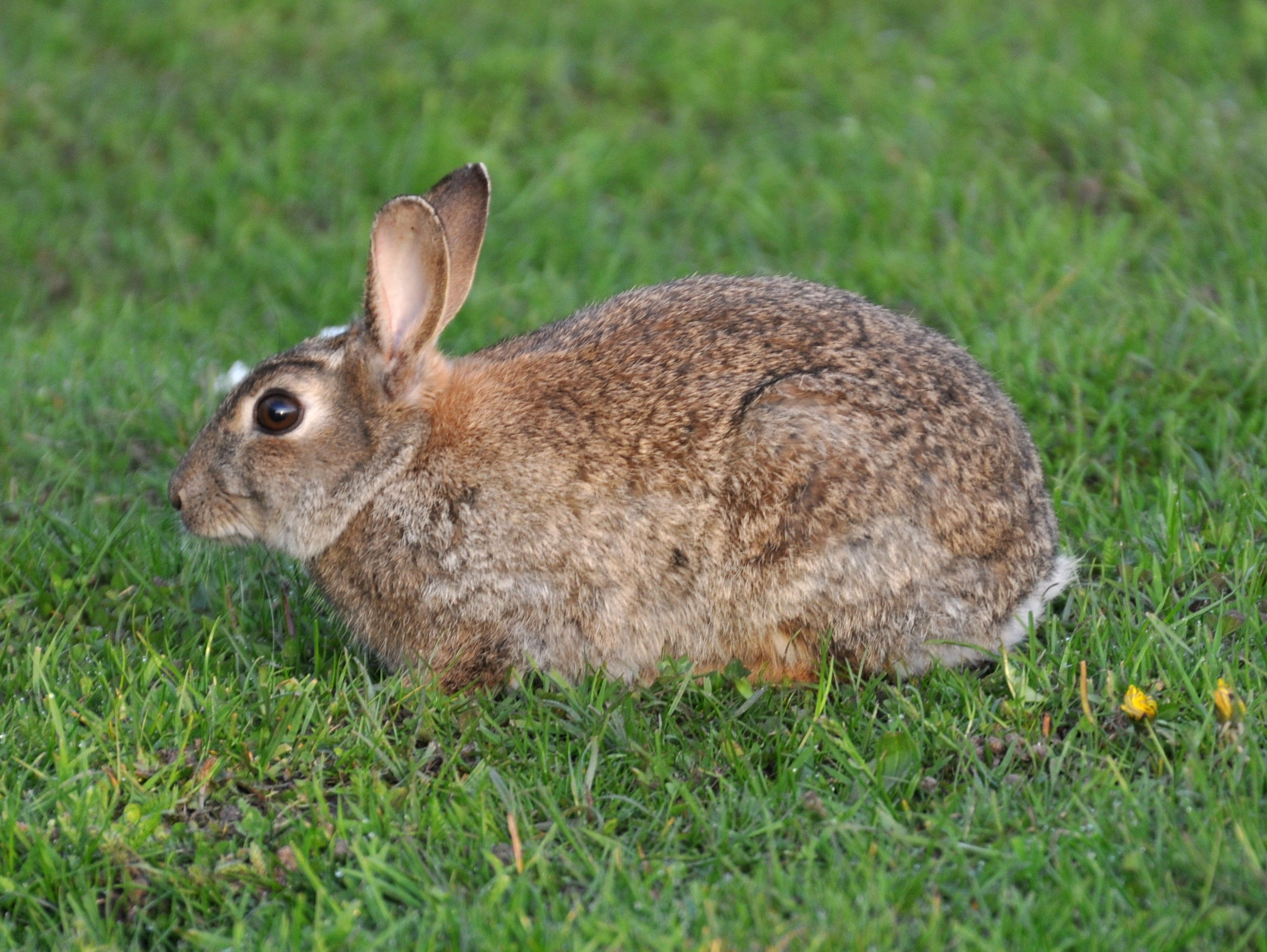
European rabbit

The lagomorphs comprise two families, Leporidae (hares and rabbits), and Ochotonidae (pikas). Though they can resemble rodents, and were classified as a superfamily in that order until the early 20th century, they have since been considered a separate order. They differ from rodents in a number of physical characteristics, such as having four incisors in the upper jaw rather than two.

- Family: Leporidae (rabbits, hares)
  - Genus: Lepus
    - Granada hare, L. granatensis LC introduced
  - Genus: Oryctolagus
    - European rabbit, O. cuniculus EN introduced

== Order: Erinaceomorpha (hedgehogs and gymnures) ==
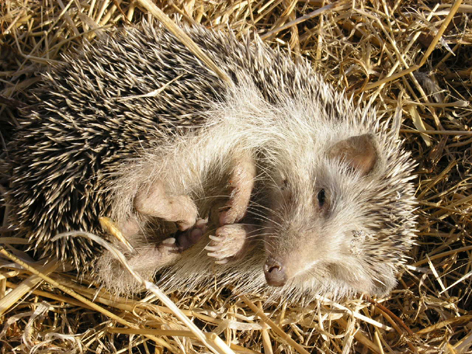
North African hedgehog

The order Erinaceomorpha contains a single family, Erinaceidae, which comprise the hedgehogs and gymnures. The hedgehogs are easily recognised by their spines while gymnures look more like large rats.

- Family: Erinaceidae (hedgehogs)
  - Subfamily: Erinaceinae
    - Genus: Atelerix
      - North African hedgehog, A. algirus LC introduced

== Order: Soricomorpha (shrews, moles, and solenodons) ==
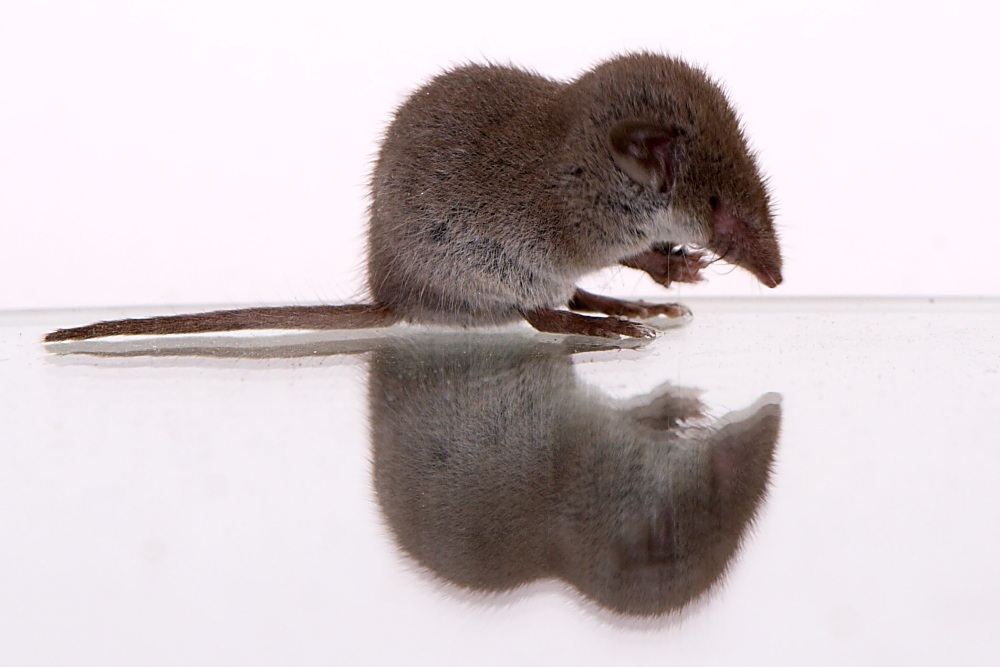
Lesser white-toothed shrew

The "shrew-forms" are insectivorous mammals. The shrews and solenodons closely resemble mice while the moles are stout bodied burrowers.

- Family: Soricidae (shrews)
  - Subfamily: Crocidurinae
    - Genus: Crocidura
      - North African white-toothed shrew, C. ichnusae DD introduced
      - Lesser white-toothed shrew, C. suaveolens LC introduced
    - Genus: Suncus
      - Etruscan shrew, S. etruscus LC introduced
  - Subfamily: Soricinae
    - Genus: Nesiotites
      - Balearic shrew, N. hidalgo EX

== Order: Chiroptera (bats) ==
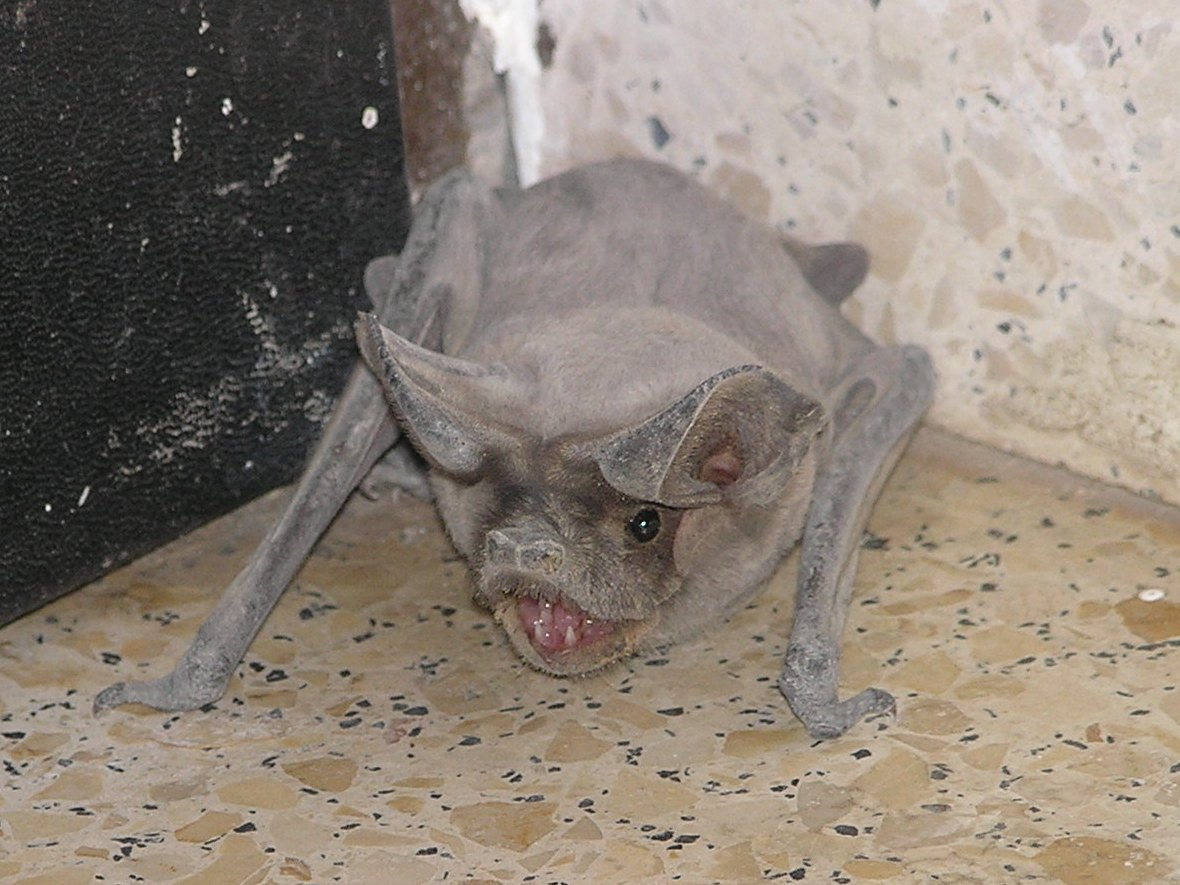
European free-tailed bat

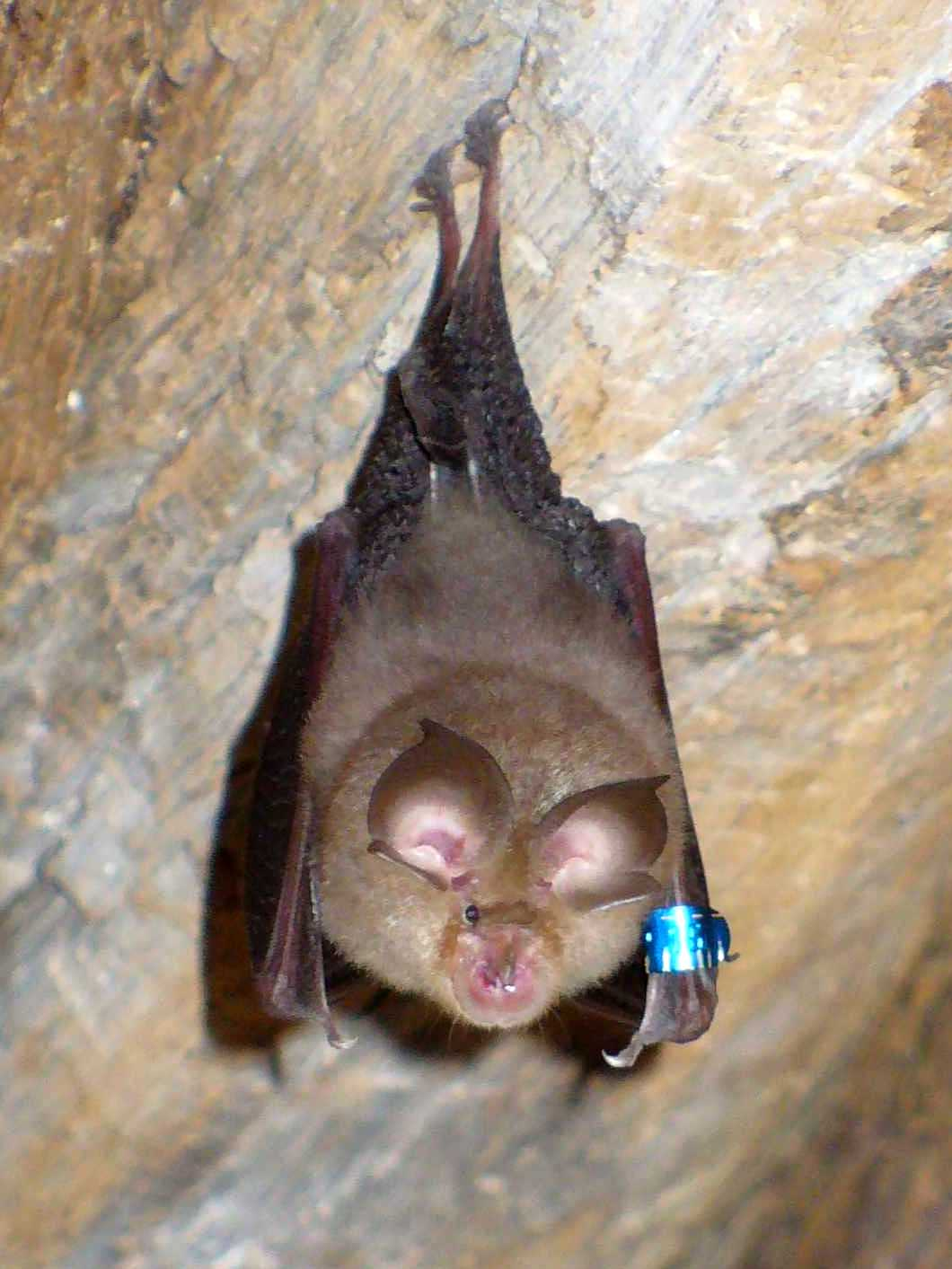
Lesser horseshoe bat

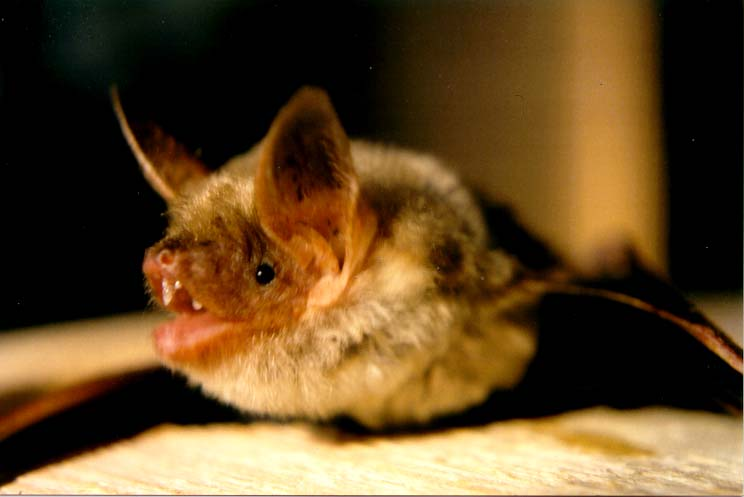
Greater mouse-eared bat

The bats' most distinguishing feature is that their forelimbs are developed as wings, making them the only mammals capable of flight. Bat species account for about 20% of all mammals.

- Family: Miniopteridae (long-winged bats)
  - Subfamily: Miniopterinae
    - Genus: Miniopterus
      - Common bent-wing bat, M. schreibersi NT
- Family: Molossidae (free-tailed bats)
  - Subfamily: Molossinae
    - Genus: Tadarida
      - European free-tailed bat, T. teniotis LC
- Family: Rhinolophidae (horseshoe bats)
  - Subfamily: Rhinolophinae
    - Genus: Rhinolophus
      - Greater horseshoe bat, R. ferrumequinum NT
      - Lesser horseshoe bat, R. hipposideros NT
      - Mehely's horseshoe bat, R. mehelyi VU
- Family: Vespertilionidae (mouse-eared bats)
  - Subfamily: Myotinae
    - Genus: Myotis
      - Lesser mouse-eared bat, M. blythii NT
      - Long-fingered bat, M. capaccinii VU
      - Geoffroy's bat, M. emarginatus LC
      - Greater mouse-eared bat, M. myotis LC
      - Natterer's bat, M. nattereri LC
  - Subfamily: Verpertilioninae
    - Genus: Barbastella
      - Barbastelle, B. barbastellus NT
    - Genus: Eptesicus
      - Serotine bat, E. serotinus LC
    - Genus: Hypsugo
      - Savi's pipistrelle, H. savii LC
    - Genus: Plecotus
      - Grey long-eared bat, P. austriacus LC
    - Genus: Pipistrellus
      - Kuhl's pipistrelle, P. kuhlii LC
      - Common pipistrelle, P. pipistrellus LC
      - Soprano pipistrelle, P. pygmaeus LC

== Order: Cetacea (whales) ==
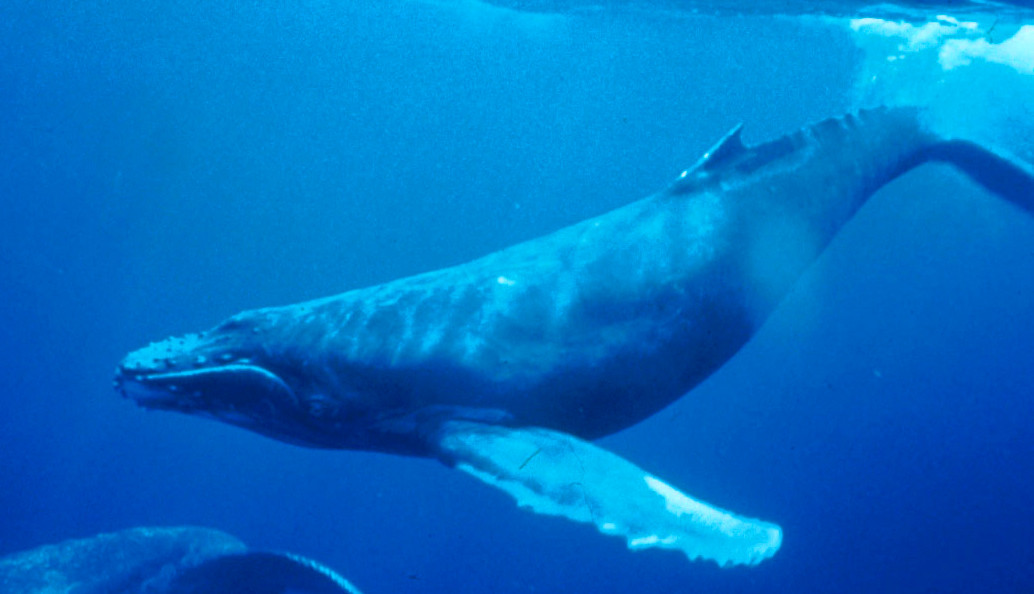
Humpback whale

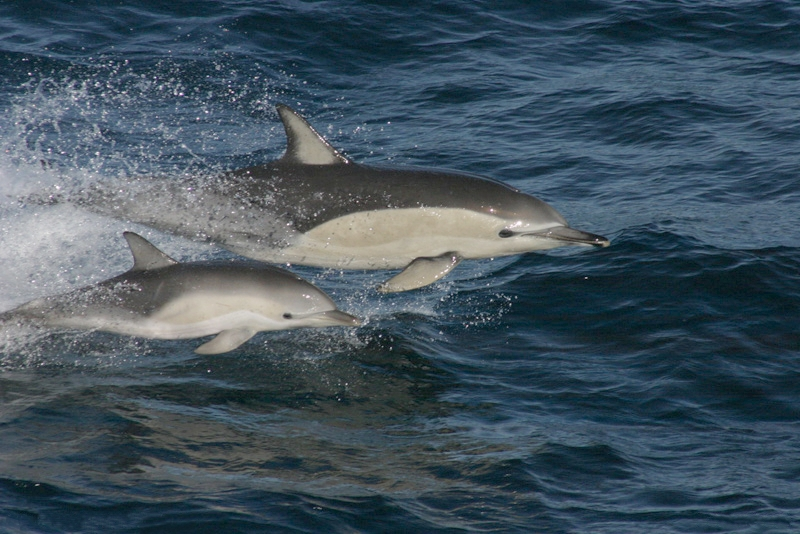
Short-beaked common dolphin and calf

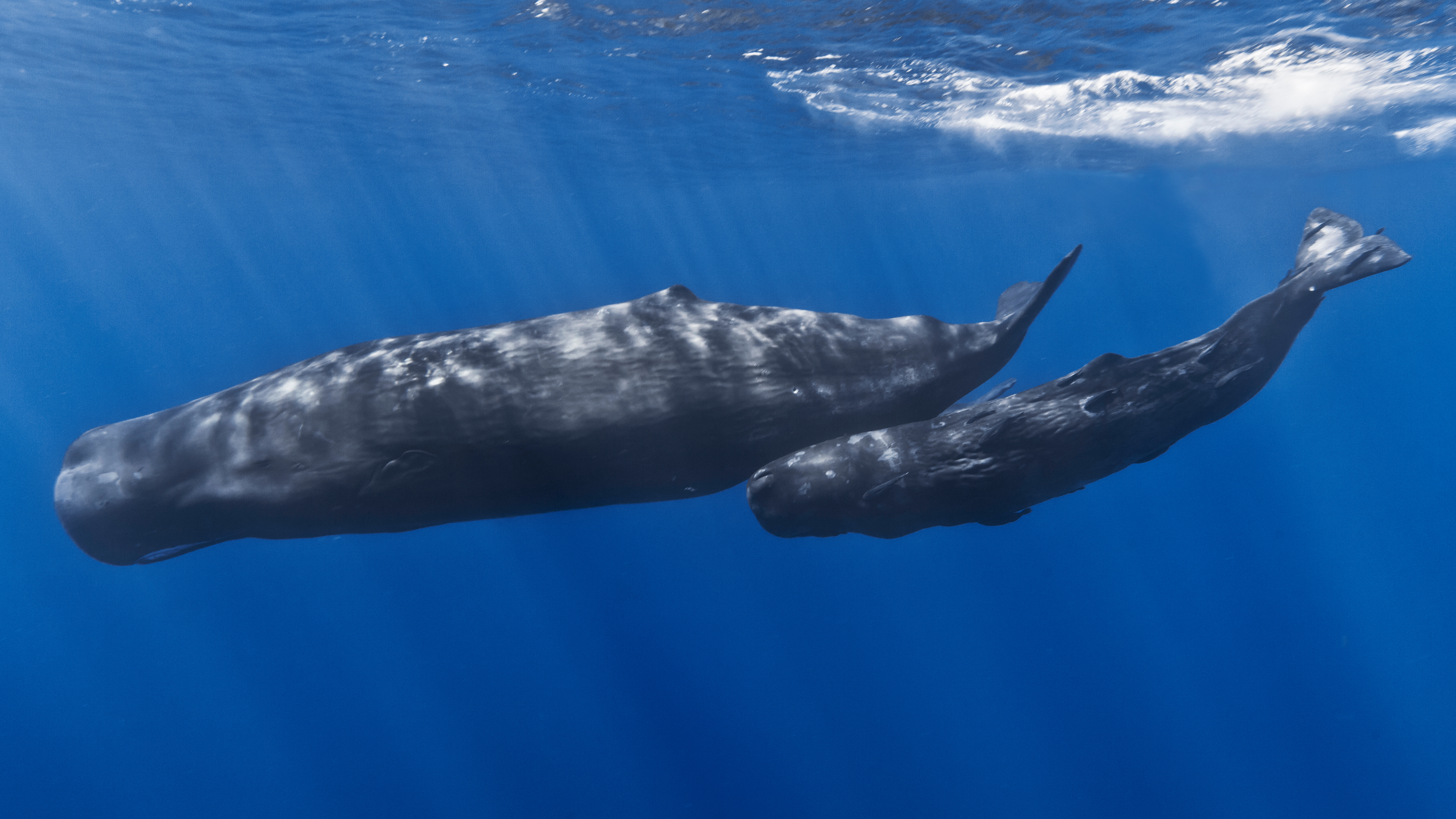
Sperm whale and calf

The order Cetacea includes whales, dolphins and porpoises. They are the mammals most fully adapted to aquatic life with a spindle-shaped nearly hairless body, protected by a thick layer of blubber, and forelimbs and tail modified to provide propulsion underwater.

- Suborder: Mysticeti
  - Family: Balaenopteridae (rorquals)
    - Genus: Balaenoptera
      - Fin whale, B. physalus VU
- Suborder: Odontoceti
  - Family: Delphinidae (dolphins and pilot whales)
    - Genus: Delphinus
      - Short-beaked common dolphin, D. delphis EN
    - Genus: Globicephala
      - Long-finned pilot whale, G. melas DD
    - Genus: Grampus
      - Risso's dolphin, G. griseus DD
    - Genus: Orcinus
      - Orca, O. orca DD
    - Genus: Pseudorca
      - False killer whale, P. crassidens NA
    - Genus: Stenella
      - Striped dolphin, S. coeruleoalba VU
    - Genus: Tursiops
      - Common bottlenose dolphin, T. truncatus VU
  - Family: Physeteridae (sperm whales)
    - Genus: Physeter
      - Sperm whale, P. macrocephalus EN
  - Family: Ziphiidae (beaked whales)
    - Genus: Ziphius
      - Cuvier's beaked whale, Z. cavirostris VU

== Order: Carnivora (carnivorans) ==
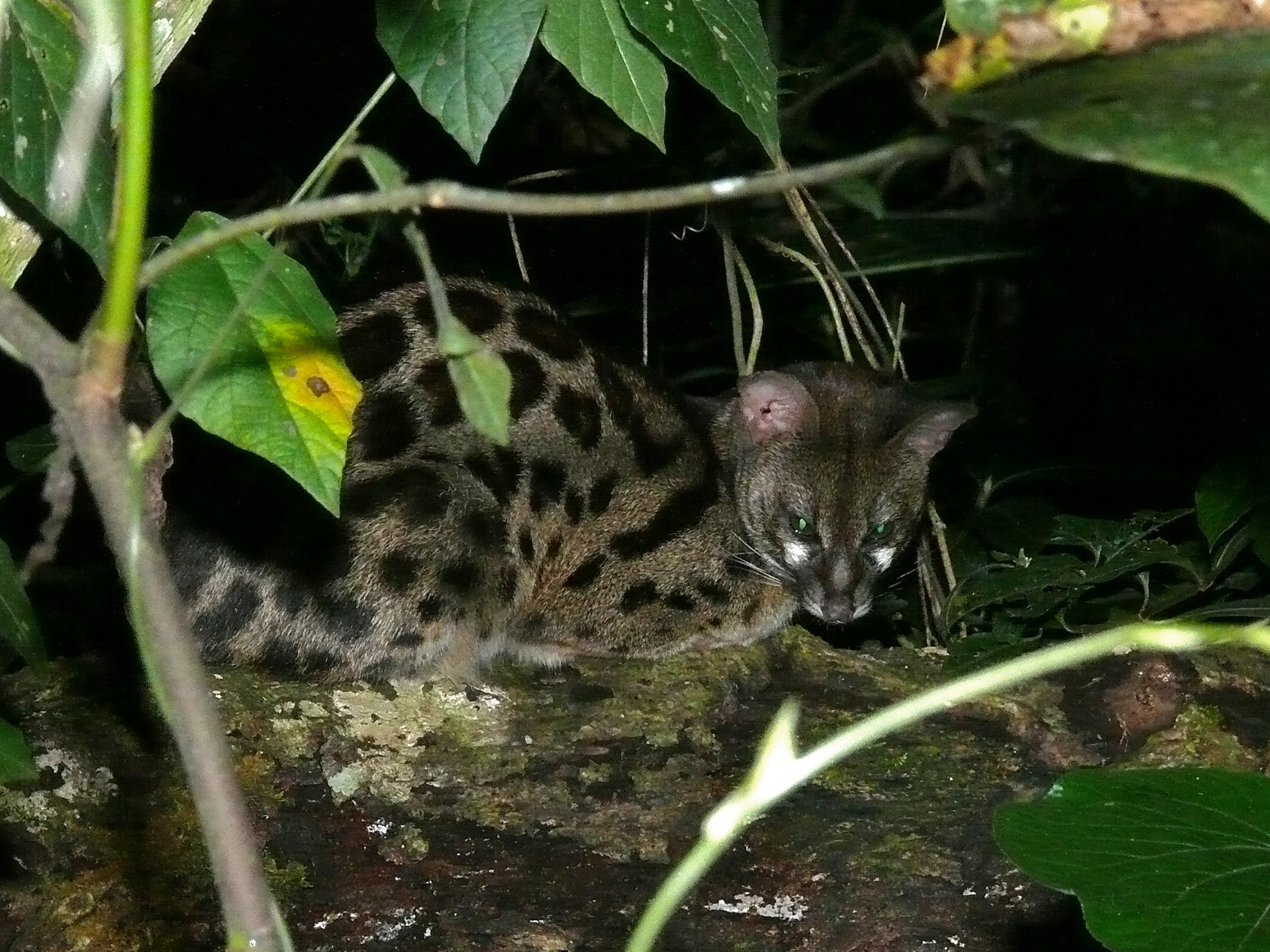
Common genet

There are over 260 species of carnivorans, the majority of which feed primarily on meat. They have a characteristic skull shape and dentition.

  - Family: Viverridae (civets and genets)
    - Genus: Genetta
      - Common genet, G. genetta LC introduced
- Suborder: Caniformia
  - Family: Mustelidae (weasels)
    - Genus: Martes
      - European pine marten, M. martes LC introduced
    - Genus: Mustela
      - Least weasel, M. nivalis LC introduced

== Order: Artiodactyla (even-toed ungulates) ==
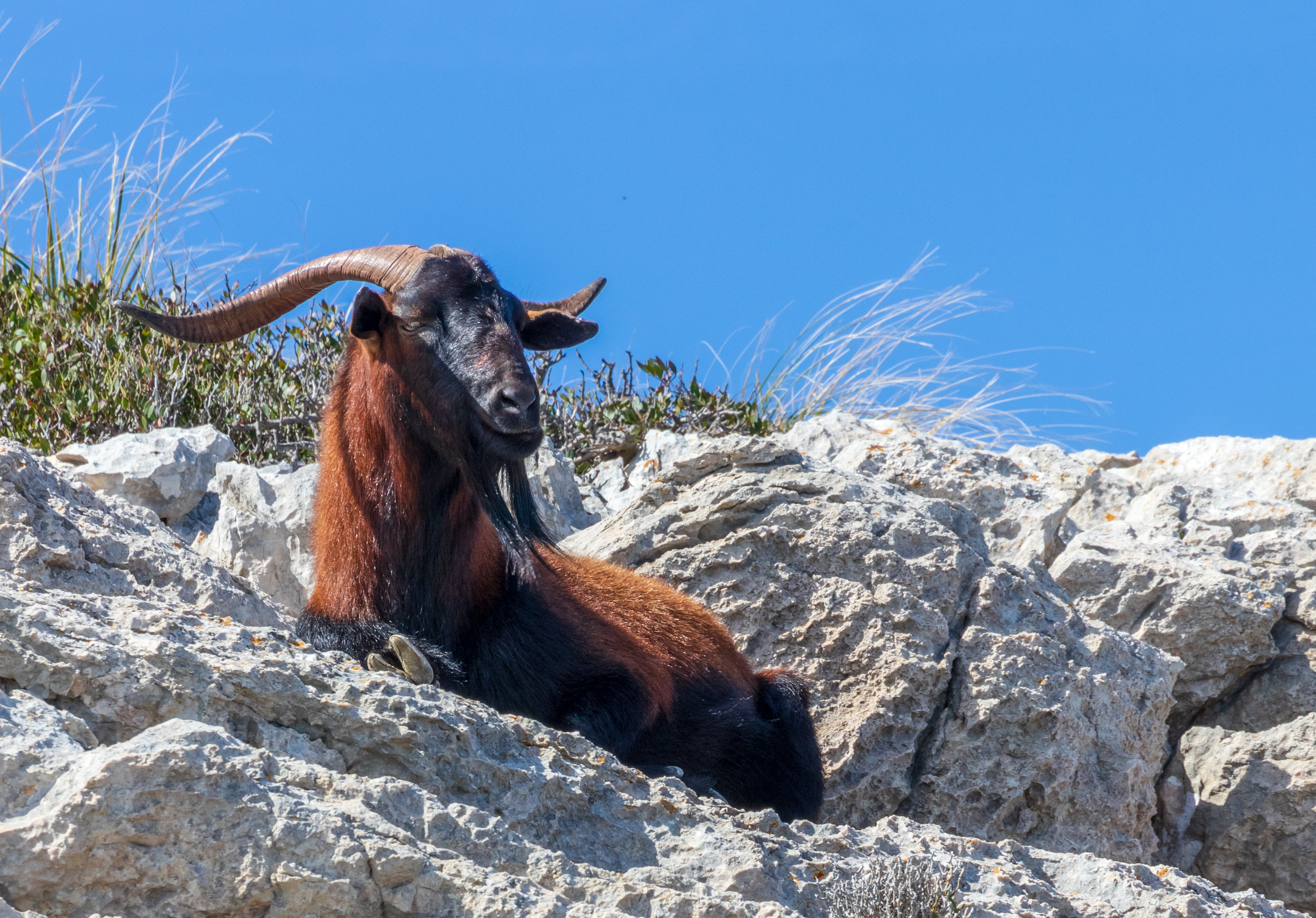
A boc or Majorcan feral goat

The even-toed ungulates are ungulates whose weight is borne about equally by the third and fourth toes, rather than mostly or entirely by the third as in perissodactyls. There are about 220 artiodactyl species, including many that are of great economic importance to humans.

- Family: Bovidae (cattle, antelope, sheep, goats)
  - Subfamily: Caprinae
    - Genus: Capra
      - Balearean boc, C. capra var. majorcan introduced
    - Genus: Myotragus
      - Balearic cave goat, M. balearicus EX

== Locally extinct ==
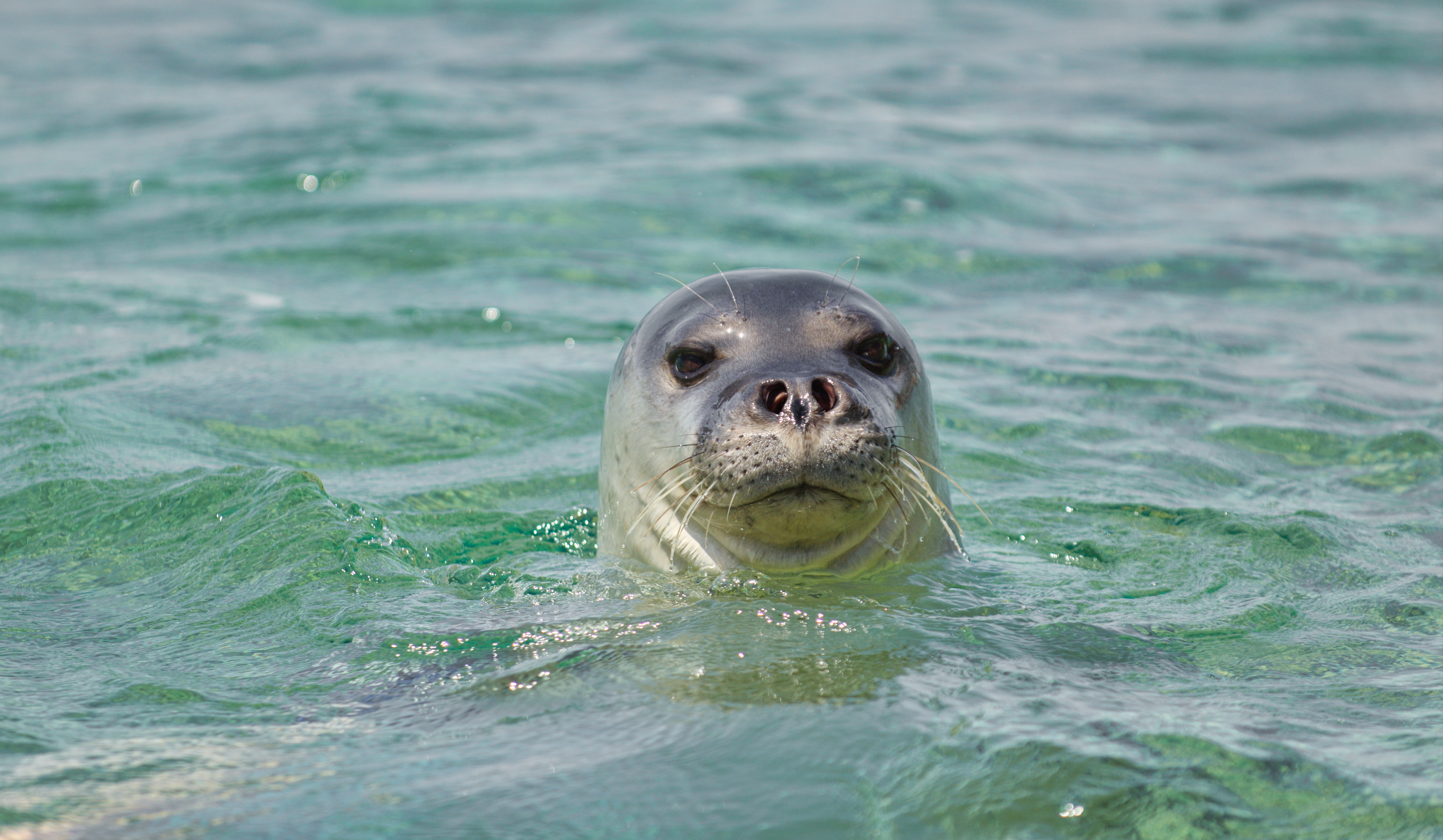
Mediterranean monk seal

The following species are locally extinct in the area but continue to exist elsewhere:

- Mediterranean monk seal, Monachus monachus

== See also ==
- List of chordate orders
- Lists of mammals by region
- List of prehistoric mammals
- Mammal classification
- List of mammals described in the 2000s
- List of amphibians of the Balearic Islands
