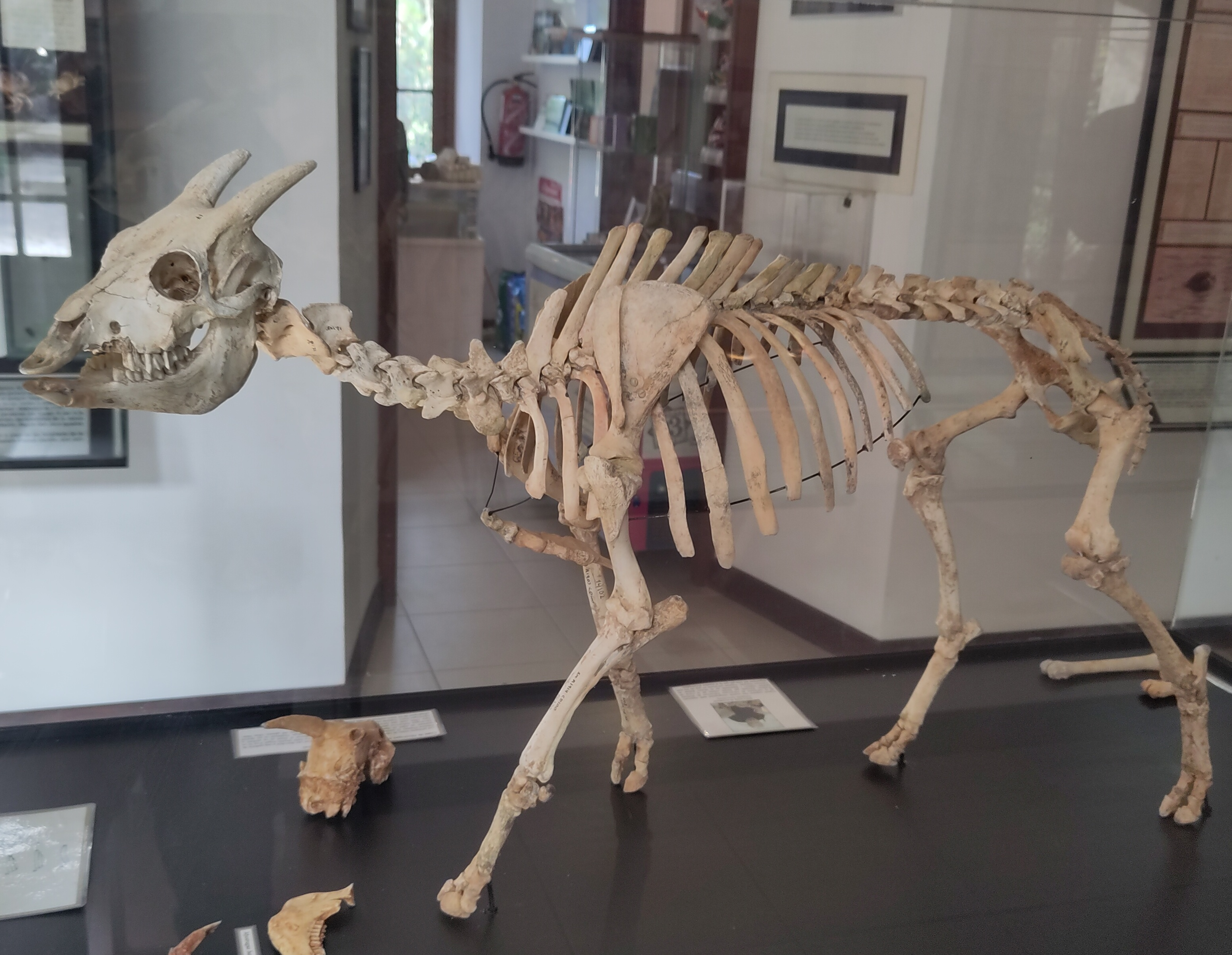
- Skeleton of Myotragus balearicus

Scientific classification
- Kingdom: Animalia
- Phylum: Chordata
- Class: Mammalia
- Order: Artiodactyla
- Family: Bovidae
- Subfamily: Caprinae
- Tribe: Caprini
- Genus: †Myotragus; Bate, 1909

Type species
- †Myotragus balearicus Bate, 1909

Other species
- M. palomboi Bover, Quintana & Alcover, 2010; M. pepgonellae Moyà-Solà & Pons-Moyà, 1982; M. antiquus Pons-Moyà, 1977; M. kopperi Moya & Pons, 1980; M. batei Crusafont & Angel, 1966

Synonyms
- Insulotragus Bover & Alcover, 2005

= Myotragus =

Myotragus Temporal range: Pliocene–Holocene 5.3–0.0046 Ma

Extinct genus of mammals

Myotragus (Neo-Latin, derived from the Greek: μῦς, τράγος "mouse-goat") is an extinct genus of goat-antelope in the tribe Caprini which lived on the Balearic Islands of Mallorca and Menorca in the western Mediterranean until its extinction around 4,300 years ago. The fossil record of Myotragus on the Balearic Islands extends over 5 million years back to the early Pliocene on Mallorca, thought to have arrived from the European mainland after the evaporation of the Mediterranean Sea during the Messinian Salinity Crisis at the end of the Miocene epoch (around 5.96-5.33 million years ago). Following the refilling of the Mediterranean at the beginning of the Pliocene, the Balearic Islands remained strongly isolated, allowing the evolution of Myotragus to occur over the next 5.3 million years with little outside influence.

Myotragus is represented by six sequential chronospecies showing progressive morphological change, including a reduction in body size, over the course of over 5 million years of evolution in isolation on the Balearics. The youngest and best-known species, M. balearicus, is noted for a number of unusual morphological adaptations, including shortened legs with stiffened feet, forward facing eyes suggestive of binocular vision, a reduced number of teeth as well as an evergrowing lower incisor, and a relatively long lifespan, which developed in an unusual ecosystem where only a few other mammal species were present, terrestrial predators were absent, and Myotragus functioned as the only major herbivore. M. balearicus became extinct when humans arrived in the Balearic Islands during the 3rd millennium BC (at minimum around 2282 BC), along with the large shrew Nesiotites and the giant dormouse Hypnomys, the only other terrestrial mammals native to the islands.

Early genetic research suggested that it was closely related to sheep of the genus Ovis; however, more recent research has indicated that its closest living relative is the takin (Budorcas taxicolor).

== History of discovery and taxonomy ==
The first remains of Myotragus were described by Dorothea Bate in 1909. Bate had been sent a letter by Robert Ashington Bullen, who informed her about a bone-bearing breccia deposit on the east of Mallorca, which prompted her to survey the island for Pleistocene aged cave deposits. Three such deposits were found, which yielded fragmentary remains of Myotragus, including a mostly complete skull, associated with a mandible and atlas vertebra, which was designated the type specimen of the new species and genus Myotragus balearicus. In 1915, Charles William Andrews described more material discovered in the intervening years, including material that had been discovered on Menorca.

=== Species ===
Six sequential chronospecies of Myotragus have been named, representing 5 million years of gradual accumulated morphological change, including a reduction in body size and changes to the locomotor system, the teeth and the visual system.

- M. palomboi Bover, Quintana & Alcover, 2010 Early Pliocene, Mallorca
- M. pepgonellae Moyà-Solà & Pons-Moyà, 1982 Middle Pliocene, Mallorca
- M. antiquus Pons-Moyà, 1977 Late Pliocene (c. 3.6-2.6 Ma), Mallorca
- M. kopperi Moya & Pons, 1980 Early Pleistocene, Mallorca
- M. batei Crusafont & Angel, 1966 Middle Pleistocene, Mallorca, Menorca
- M. balearicus Bate, 1909 Late Pleistocene-Holocene, Mallorca, Menorca

The species M. binigausensis Moyà-Solà and Pons-Moyà, 1980 from the Pleistocene of Menorca has been synonymised with M. batei. In 2005, a new genus Insulotragus, was erected by Bolver and Alcover, to house the earliest species that had previously been attributed to Myotragus, but this proposal was not widely accepted.

== Evolution ==
The closest fossil relatives of Myotragus are uncertain. A close relationship has been proposed to the genera Aragoral and Norbertia from the Late Miocene of mainland Europe, as well as the insular genera Ebusia from the Pliocene of Ibiza, and Nesogoral from the Early Pleistocene of Sardinia. A 2005 study of a partial mitochondrial genome suggested that Myotragus was the sister group to the genus Ovis, which includes sheep. However, analysis of a complete mitochondrial genome of M. balearicus published in 2019 found that its closest living relative is the takin (Budorcas taxicolor), native to the eastern Himalayas with an estimated divergence around 7.1 million years ago. A cladogram showing its position within Caprinae/Caprini is given below.

- - Bos
  - Caprini
    - Pantholops (Tibetan antelope)
    - - - - †Bootherium (Helmeted muskox)
          - Ovibos (Musk ox)
        - - Capricornis (Serow)
          - Naemorhedus (Goral)
      - - - Ovis (Sheep)
        - - - - - Oreamnos (Mountain goat)
              - - - Budorcas (Takin)
                - - - †Myotragus
            - - - Rupicapra (Chamois)
          - - - Ammotragus (Barbary sheep)
              - Arabitragus (Arabian tahr)
            - - - Pseudois (Bharal)
              - - Hemitragus (Himalayan tahr)
                - Capra (Markhor, ibexes, goats)

The ancestor of Myotragus likely arrived in the Balearic Islands during the Messinian stage of the late Miocene at a time at which the Strait of Gibraltar closed and the Mediterranean Sea evaporated, reducing sea level within the basin by 800–1200 metres, in an event called the Messinian salinity crisis (spanning from 5.96 to 5.33 million years ago), allowing dispersal from the Iberian Peninsula to the Balearics.

Later on, the re-opening of the straits and the resultant Zanclean flood, which refilled the Mediterranean at the beginning of the Pliocene around 5.3 million years ago isolated the animal populations on the islands. The Balearic Islands remained strongly isolated following the end of the Messinian Salinity Crisis, with no terrestrial vertebrate species dispersing to Mallorca and Menorca until modern human arrival on the islands during the Holocene, over 5 million years later. The changes in morphology Myotragus developed over the course of its evolution were probably driven by resource limitation on the relatively resource poor Balearics, with the lack of competitors leading to increased intraspecific competition, and the absence of effective predators meaning the population would periodically outstrip the carrying capacity of the islands, resulting in the overconsumption of vegetation faster than it could regrow, causing food resources to become heavily depleted, and as a consequence mass starvation, with only a small proportion of the population surviving a starvation episode, leading to strong selection pressure.

Myotragus initially only colonized the island of Mallorca. Only a handful of mammal species aside from Myotragus were able to colonise the island, including shrews, hamsters, dormice, murines (the subfamily including Old World rats and mice) and rabbits. By the Late Pliocene, Myotragus represented one of only three genera of terrestrial mammal present on Mallorca, alongside the giant dormouse Hypnomys and the shrew Nesiotites, all of which would continue to be present on the island until the Holocene. On Menorca, a giant rabbit, Nuralagus rex evolved that covered the same niche as Myotragus in Mallorca. With the level of the sea falling due to glacial cycles during the Pleistocene, Mallorca and Menorca were periodically connected and the mammals of Mallorca, including Myotragus colonised Menorca, replacing the giant Menorcan rabbits. Following numerous cycles of connection and separation over the course of the Pleistocene, Menorca and Mallorca separated again at the beginning of the Holocene.

== Description ==
Average size of adult Myotragus balearicus compared to a human

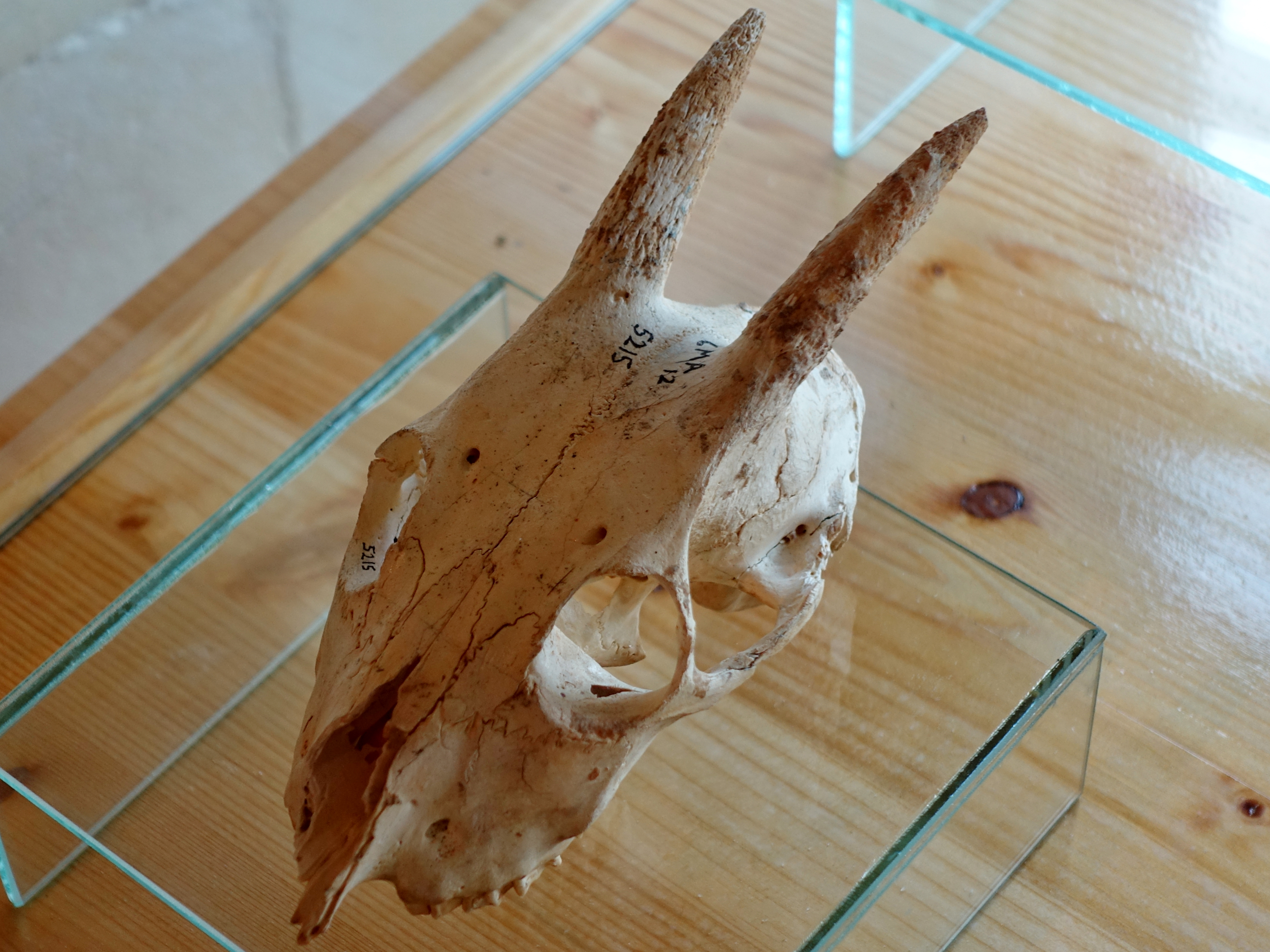
Skull in oblique view

The size of Myotragus varied between species, with later species on average smaller than earlier species as well as their mainland relatives, representing an example of insular dwarfism. The early species M. pepgonellae is estimated to have had a body mass of approximately 60 kilograms (130 lb), while the later M. kopperi is estimated to have been approximately 23 kilograms (51 lb). M. balearicus is estimated to have been approximately 50 centimetres (1.6 ft) tall at the shoulder on average, with a 2004 study estimating an adult body mass of around 23–32 kg (51–71 lb), with another study estimating that it was around 18% the size of its late Miocene mainland relative/possible ancestor Aragoral. However, the size of adult M. balearicus individuals varied considerably, with one adult individual recorded as being only 22 centimetres (8.7 in) tall at the shoulder. Although Waldren (1999) wrote that "both sexes of [Myotragus balearicus] are in osteological appearance unusually similar", and that there are "no clear sexual differences [between the skeletons of females and males of M. balearicus]" Bover and Alcover (1999) wrote that M. balearicus was "a highly [sexually] dimorphic species at the adult stage". Assessing the presence of sized-based sexual dimorphism in M. balearicus is complicated by the high variance in size of both male and female individuals across time and space.

The limbs of M. balearicus, particularly the metapodial and phalange bones, are proportionally short in comparison to other caprines, with the tarsals, metatarsals and sesamoids being partially fused. The abdominal ribcage of M. balearicus is very broad in comparison to other caprines, suggesting that it hosted relatively large organs, with the rumen in particular probably being enlarged relative to other caprines.

Over the course of its evolution, the rostrum, the frontmost part of the skull forward of the eyesockets, of Myotragus became progressively shorter, resulting in the skull of M. balearicus being both very short and very deep. The eye sockets (orbits) of the skull of M. balearicus are roughly half the size those of other comparably sized caprines, and face forward as opposed to the sides as in most ungulates and in earlier Myotragus species, allowing for binocular vision. The skull had a pair of small, directly backward projecting horns that diverge little from each other, which are set relatively widely apart from each other on the skull and have a roughly circular (subcircular) cross section. There is little difference in horn core shape between male and female individuals, though it has been suggested that some of the skull bones (the basioccipital, basisphenoid and parietal bone) are thicker in male individuals, and that there are subtle differences in horn core morphology.

The species of Myotragus show a progressive reduction in the number of teeth through time, with M. balearicus having an adult dentition comprising a single evergrowing (hypselodont) incisor (a feature highly unusual among Bovidae, the broader group containing caprines, bovines, and antelopes), one premolar, and three molars in each half of the lower jaw, and two premolars and three molars in each half of the upper jaw. By contrast, the earliest species had three incisors, one canine, and two premolars in each half of the lower jaw, as is typical of most ruminants with the incisors not being ever-growing, and a third premolar present in each half of the upper jaw. The teeth in the later species are much more hypsodont (high crowned) than in earlier species.

== Paleobiology ==
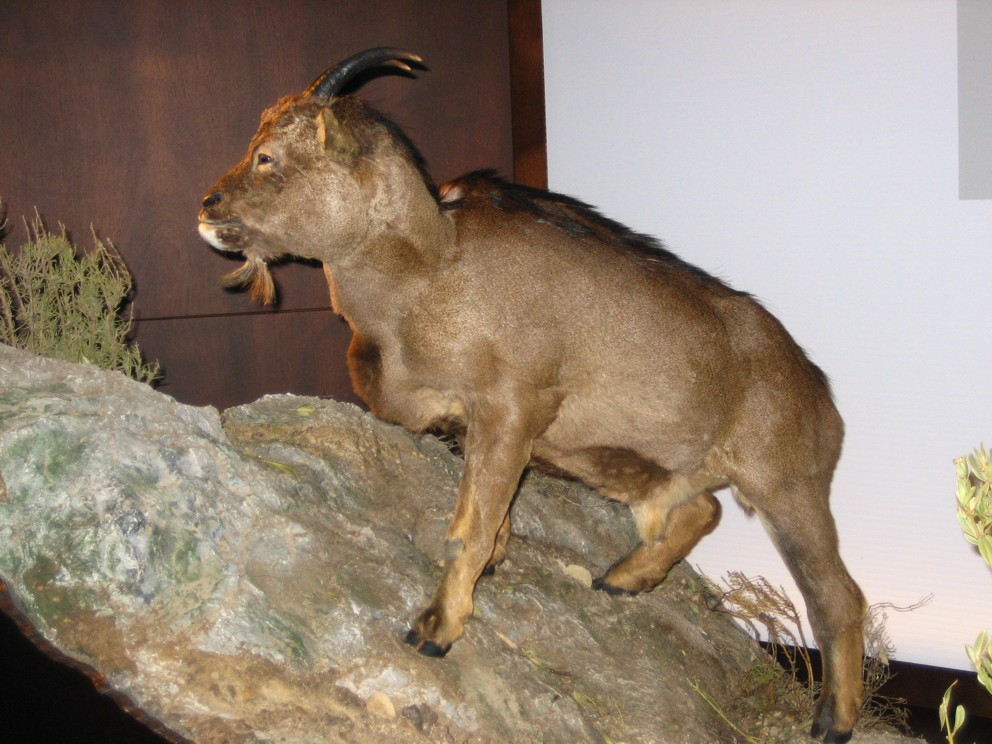
Restoration

=== Diet ===
While tooth morphology and tooth texture suggests that some earlier Myotragus species may have been grazers or mixed feeders (consuming both grass and browse), coprolites (preserved feces) of M. balearicus found at Balma de Son Matge and Cova Estreta on Mallorca indicates that it was likely predominantly a browser, and heavily dependent on the native boxwood species Buxus balearica for a large part of its diet, most likely feeding on the leaves and the flowers. This plant is known for toxicity, with a high concentration of poisonous alkaloid compounds, with other boxwood species known to cause toxic effects when ingested by other bovids, suggesting that the digestive system of M. balearicus had developed the ability to effectively process and neutralise the toxins without ill effect. The smoothness of the coprolites suggests that digestion was highly efficient. The progressively more high-crowned teeth of Myotragus over the course of its evolution likely represents at least in part an adaptation to the increased consumption of abrasive food. M. balearicus may have used the evergrowing lower incisor for stripping bark, excavating roots, and feeding on low-growing vegetation. The shortened face of later Myotragus species is suggested to have enhanced chewing efficiency.

=== Movement and senses ===
An analysis of the phalanges (digits) of M. balearicus found that the bones of the foot were tightly bound by ligaments and inelastic, with a much reduced range of movement in the joints of the feet (separate from the rest of the legs), compared to living caprines, and lacked the "shock absorbing-elastic spring mechanism" found in the feet of living caprines and other artiodactyls, where during fast locomotion (trot and canter), strain energy is stored in the elastic feet tendons to be subsequently used during the rebounding lift-off motion of the foot from the ground. This suggests that M. balearicus was unable to run and could only walk slowly, with a reduced step length relative to living caprines, and lacked the ability to jump. The likely reason for this is as an energy saving measure, as the "shock absorbing-elastic spring mechanism" in the foot bones of other caprines requires large amounts of muscle energy, as well as helping to stabilise the joints, reducing the likelihood of potentially lethal leg injuries, with the ability to move quickly unnecessary on the largely predator-free islands. The proximal (closest to the ankle) and medial (intermediate between the furthest and closest) phalanges were likely orientated vertically relative to the ground surface, which reduced bending stresses.

The short limbs of Myotragus have been described as adapted to "low gear" locomotion, and have been compared to those of the living Philippine tamaraw (Bubalus mindorensis), another island endemic bovid which evolved in the absence of terrestrial predators, and the phenomenon of evolution of short limbs is also observed among a number of other island endemic bovids, both living and extinct, though the precise causal factors of this repeated adaptation are subject to debate. Meike Köhler has argued that the limb shortening represents an energy saving measure, with shorter limbs meaning that the ground reaction force is more aligned to the centers of the joints, meaning that less torque and consequently less muscle energy is needed to support a given body weight. Myotragus balearicus is thought to have been adapted for clambering locomotion, with the landscape of Mallorca being composed of considerable areas of both mountainous terrain as well as relatively flat plains.

Preserved trackways of Myotragus balearicus found in Late Pleistocene aged lithified sand dune deposits (eolianites) on the south coast of Mallorca suggest that they were clumsy in sand (which they likely only passed through and spent little time due to the absence of any food or other resources), and that at least on the dunes they did not repeatedly follow the same paths as often done by living goats, but moved in somewhat random paths. There is no evidence from the tracks that they moved in large herds, though they may have moved in small groups over the dunes.

The hollow skull cavity containing the brain (cranial endocast) of M. balearicus indicates that the areas of the brain and structures associated with vision, sound and smell are small when compared with living caprines, with the brain only being half the size of other comparably sized modern caprines, though a 2024 study found when compared to its likely late Miocene ancestors, the size reduction is a more modest 10-17%, due to the much smaller size of the brains of late Miocene bovids than contemporary bovid species, with the majority of the brain reduction in M. balearicus compared to late Miocene taxa being from the vision-associated occipital lobe including the visual cortex, though the frontal lobe remained relatively large. The smaller brain likely represents an optimisation to the animal's energy budget, as neural tissue is energetically expensive to maintain, and better developed senses were unnecessary in a resource limited environment where there was little need to detect predators. The large size of the frontal lobe compared to the small occipital lobe suggests M. balearicus likely relied heavily on touch (tactile senses) rather than sight when selecting food. The binocular vision of M. balearicus likely enhanced depth perception at the expense of the field of view. The outwards-facing eyes giving a large field of view typical of ungulates is thought to be an adaptation for vigilance against predators. The small size of the eyes and the consequent lower visual acuity likely represented an energy-saving measure, while the increased depth perception from binocular vision would have aided short range sight, for example navigating rocky terrain.

=== Physiology, growth and reproduction ===
Histological analysis of the bones of M. balearicus shows lamellar-zonal tissue throughout the cortex (outer layer of the bone), with lines of arrested growth indicating periods where growing ceased. Although this bone morphology has previously been asserted to be otherwise unique to reptiles and a sign that Myotragus was ectothermic like reptiles, later research suggested that this bone morphology is common to all ruminants and is not unique to Myotragus. Based on counting the lines of arrested growth, it has been estimated that M. balearicus reached maximum size (somatic maturity) and probably sexual maturity at 12 years of age. Analysis of the high-crowned teeth of M. balearicus, shows that they grew more slowly than those of other caprines, with their last teeth erupting at approximately six years of age, likely as an adaptation to their longevity, though the rodent-like evergrowing lower incisor of M. balearicus erupted early, both relative to the posterior teeth and in absolute age compared to other bovids. Based on skeletochronology and dental durability analysis, some individuals of M. balearicus are likely to have reached a lifespan of 27 years, which is exceptionally long relative to its body size. The estimated mortality rates are substantially lower than those found for other members of Bovidae, with a large proportion of individuals surviving into old age.

Newborn specimens of M. balearicus are estimated to have been approximately 15–18 centimetres (5.9–7.1 in) in height with a weight of about 700–900 grams (1.5–2.0 lb), approximately 30% the height and 2% the body mass of mature adult females, much lower than that of a typical ruminant, in which newborns are usually over half the height and over 4% the mass of their mother, with newborns of M. balearicus having relatively short legs in comparison to those of other bovid newborns (with the long legs typical of newborn bovids thought to be an adaptation for immediate predator avoidance from birth). Compared to living caprines and other artiodactyls, the bones of newborn Myotragus balearicus are more robust. Although the length of pregnancy and number of offspring given birth to at a time is not known for certain, given that M. balearicus clearly had a k-selected life strategy, it has been proposed that M. balearicus only gave birth to a single (or perhaps exceptionally two) offspring at a time, and had a relatively long pregnancy length.

Some authors have speculated that Myotragus balearicus engaged in rutting behaviour like living caprines. William H. Waldren argued that Myotragus balearicus males likely engaged in ramming headbutt contests against rival males and that damage to a number of M. balearicus skulls were as a result of injuries obtained during these contests. However, this proposal was met with skepticism by Damià Ramis and Pere Bover, due to the lack of evidence of impact protection features in the skull of Myotragus, as well as the lack of agility in the limbs of M. balearicus which would have made it unlikely that M. balearicus males could impart enough force to cause damage to the skulls of other males. It has been suggested that Myotragus may have exhibited a simplified, less complex repertoire of behaviour than is found in mainland bovids.

== Extinction ==
Diverse datings indicate that the three native terrestrial mammals of Mallorca and Menorca (Myotragus balearicus, the giant dormouse Hypnomys and the large shrew Nesiotites hidalgo) disappeared all in the same very short period of time, during the third millennium BC. Historically there was debate as to whether the extinctions were caused by climate change, or whether they were exterminated by the first human settlers of the Balearic Islands.

The dominant theory is the one that postulates an extinction by human causes. Traditional methods had dated the first human colonization of the Balearic Islands towards 5000 BC or even before, but subsequent tests with modern methods of dating clearly indicate that there was no human presence before 3000 BC. This date agrees very closely with the fast decline of the three forms. The youngest remains of Myotragus date to around 2632 calibrated years BC, while the minimum date of human arrival on the Balearic Islands is currently 2282 BC. Extinction was likely rapid within less than 100 years of human arrival on the islands. The two other native pre-human terrestrial vertebrates of Mallorca and Menorca, the still living Lilford's wall lizard (Podarcis lilfordi) and Majorcan midwife toad (Alytes muletensis) have been heavily impacted by human presence on the archipelago, and today are only confined to remote areas.

In 1967, archaeologists John S. Kopper and William H. Waldren proposed that humans had attempted to domesticate Myotragus following their arrival on the islands. This hypothesis, which was elaborated on by Waldren in later studies, with alleged evidence supporting the hypothesis including that "v-shaped" damaged bony horn cores of a number of Myotragus skulls were the result of deliberate horn clipping by humans, was subsequently widely accepted by the beginning of the 21st century. However, a 2001 study found that the domestication claims were unfounded and that more probably, the marks on the horn cores (which are also observed in far older clearly pre-human contexts) were the result of gnawing by other Myotragus, likely for their mineral content. Osteophagy, the gnawing on/ingestion of bones for their mineral content, has been observed among other herbivorous animals including deer and giraffes, as well as in some bovids, though the degree of osteophagy in M. balearicus was likely higher than that recorded in any living bovid.

== See also ==
- List of extinct animals of Europe
- Schultz's rule
