= List of amphibians of the Balearic Islands =

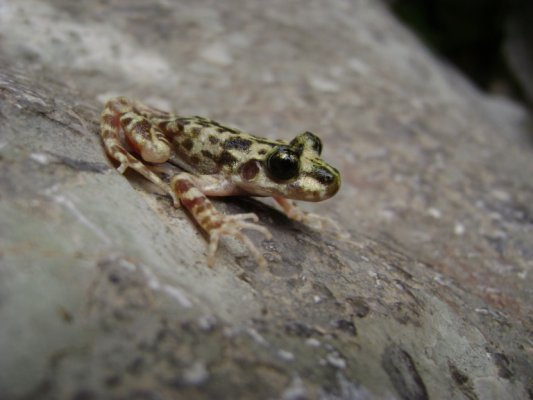
Ferreret

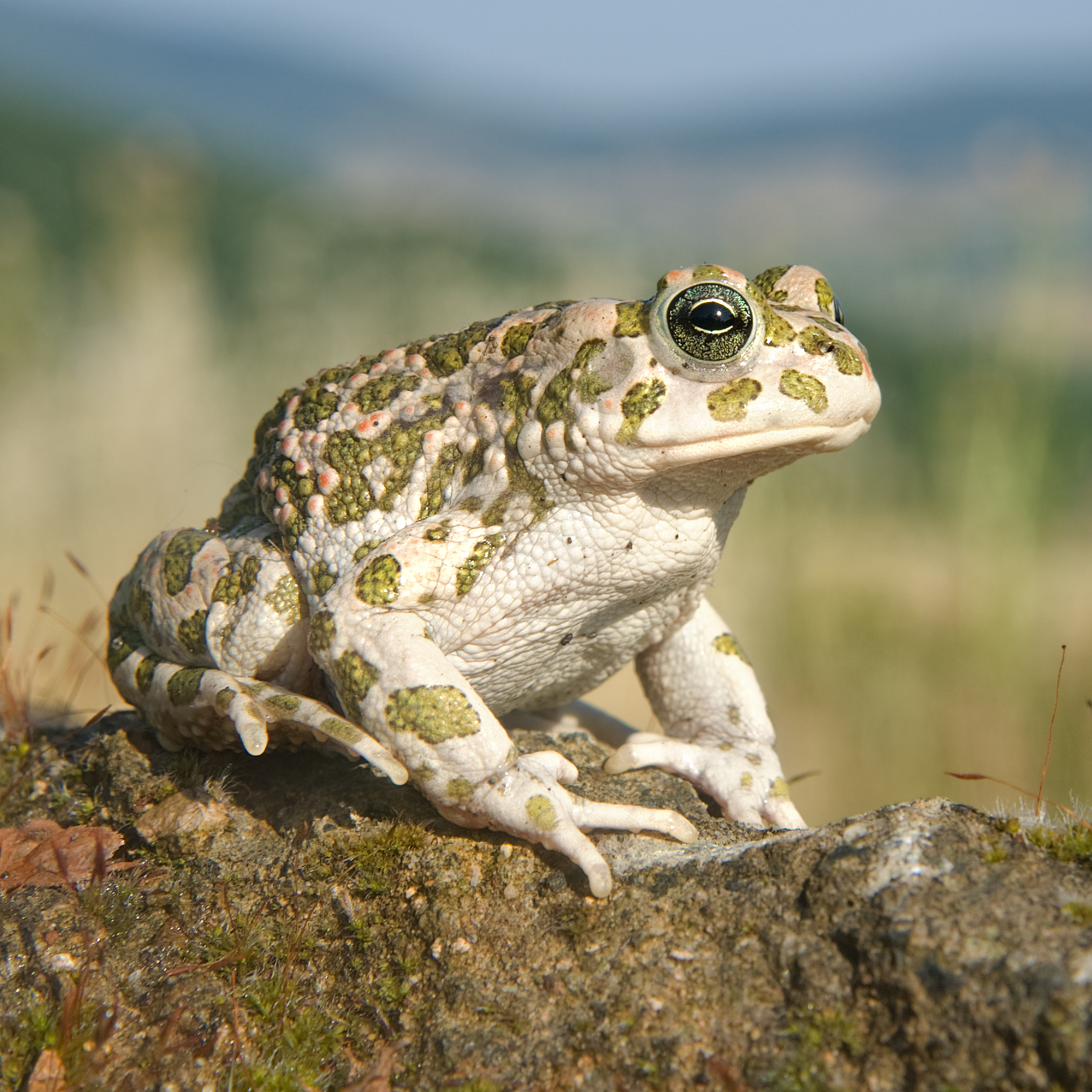
Balearic green toad

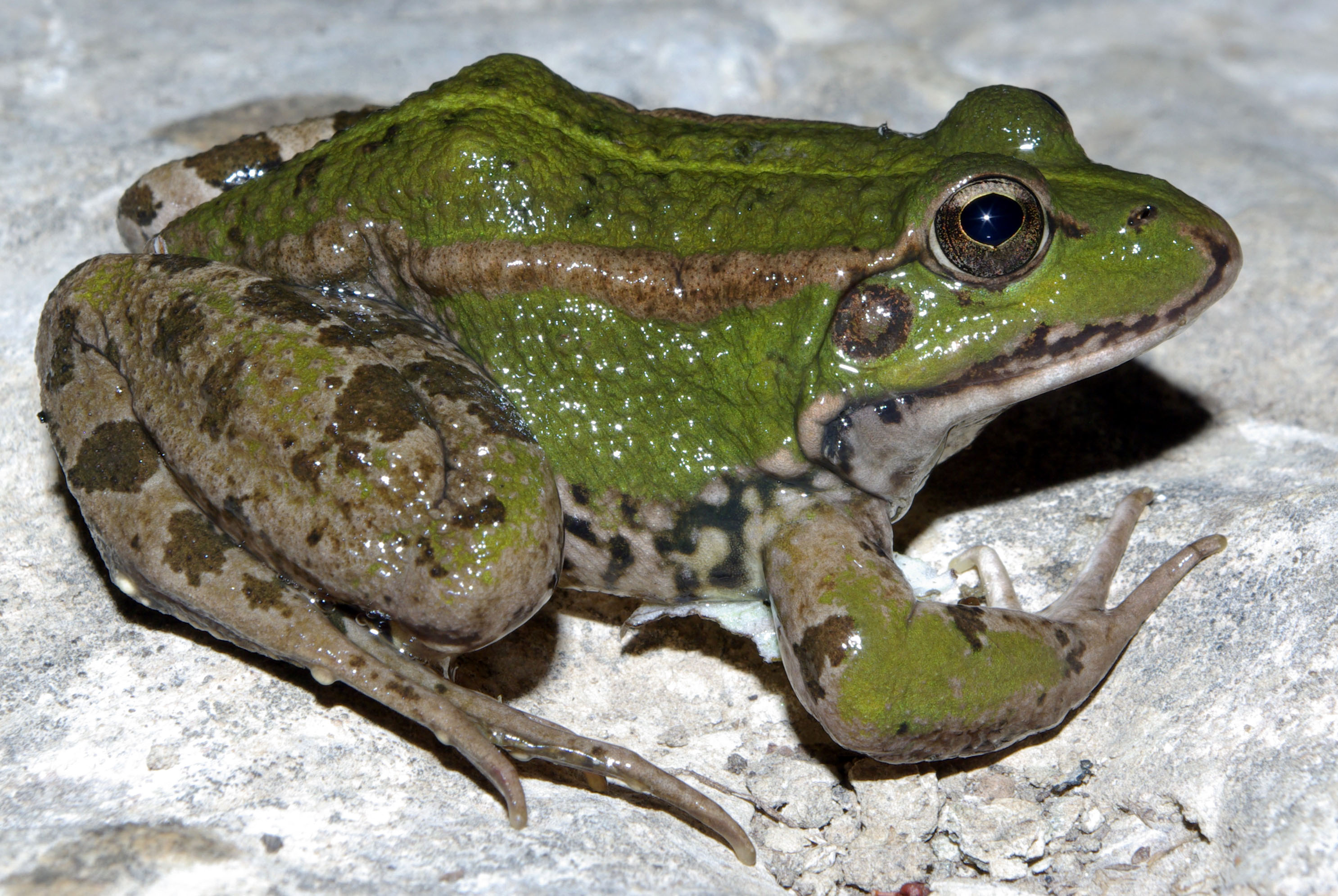
Iberian green frog

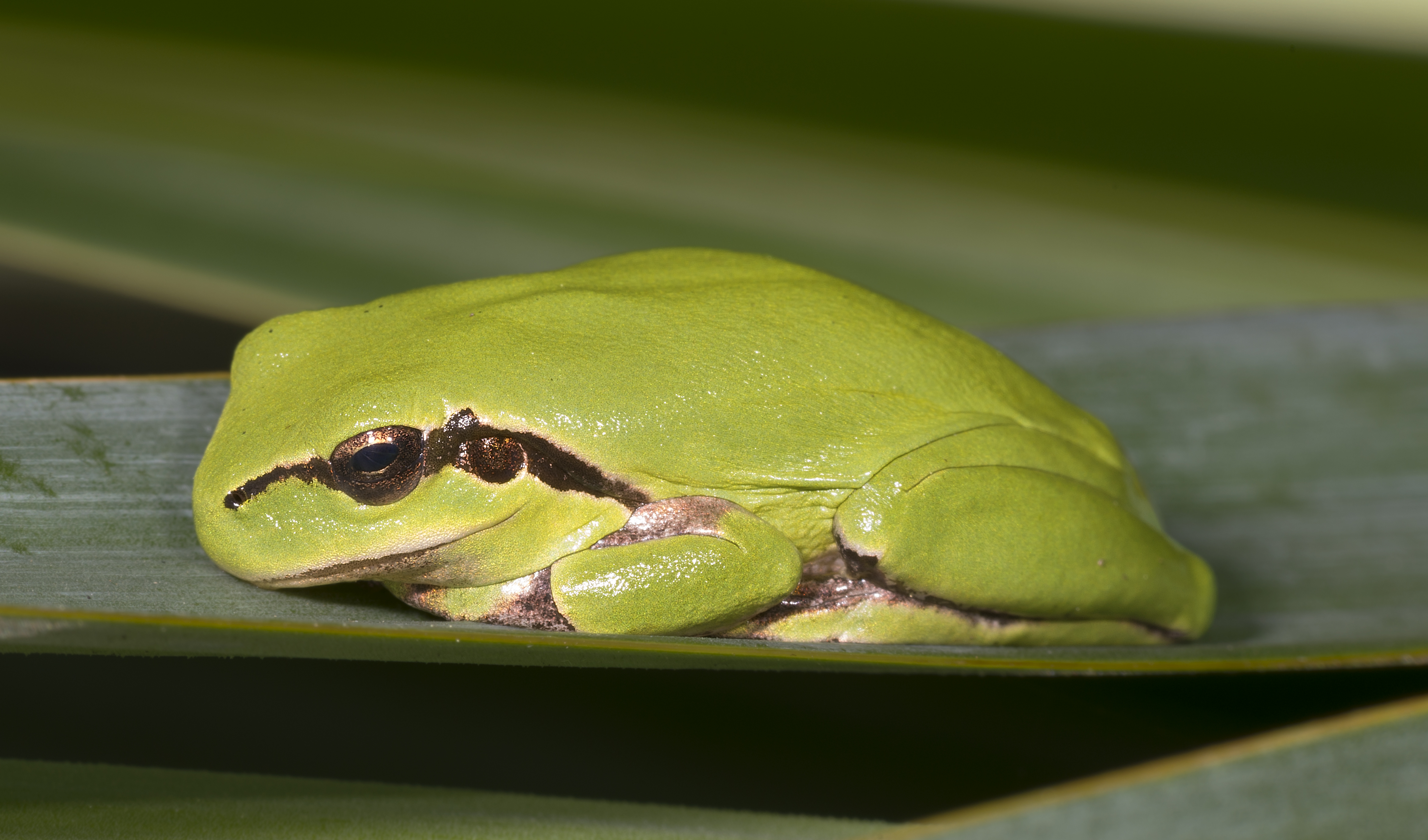
Mediterranean tree frog

There are four amphibian species that live in the Balearic Islands.

The ferreret is the only endemic species. There is debate about whether the Balearic green toad is native or introduced during prehistory due to the presence of fossil remains. The Iberian green frog and the Mediterranean tree frog were introduced by humans in prehistoric times.

At present, the Mediterranean tree frog has almost completely disappeared from the island of Mallorca for unknown reasons, with only a relict population surviving in the Alfabia gardens.

== Anura ==
=== Alytidae ===
- Ferreret (Alytes muletensis) EN

=== Bufonidae ===
- Balearic green toad (Bufotes balearicus) LC

=== Hylidae ===
- Mediterranean tree frog (Hyla meridionalis) LC

=== Ranidae ===
- Iberian green frog (Pelophylax perezi) LC

== See also ==
- List of mammals of the Balearic Islands
