= Aragoral =

Aragoral Temporal range: Late Miocene

Scientific classification
- Domain: Eukaryota
- Kingdom: Animalia
- Phylum: Chordata
- Class: Mammalia
- Order: Artiodactyla
- Family: Bovidae
- Genus: †Aragoral; Alcala & Morales, 1997
- Species: †A. mudejar

Binomial name
- †Aragoral mudejar Alcala & Morales, 1997

Extinct genus of mammals

Aragoral is an extinct genus of caprine bovid that inhabited the Iberian Peninsula during the Late Miocene.

== Taxonomy ==
Aragoral is a monospecific genus containing the species Aragoral mudejar and is believed to be closely related to primitive members of the Hippotraginae-Caprinae group.
