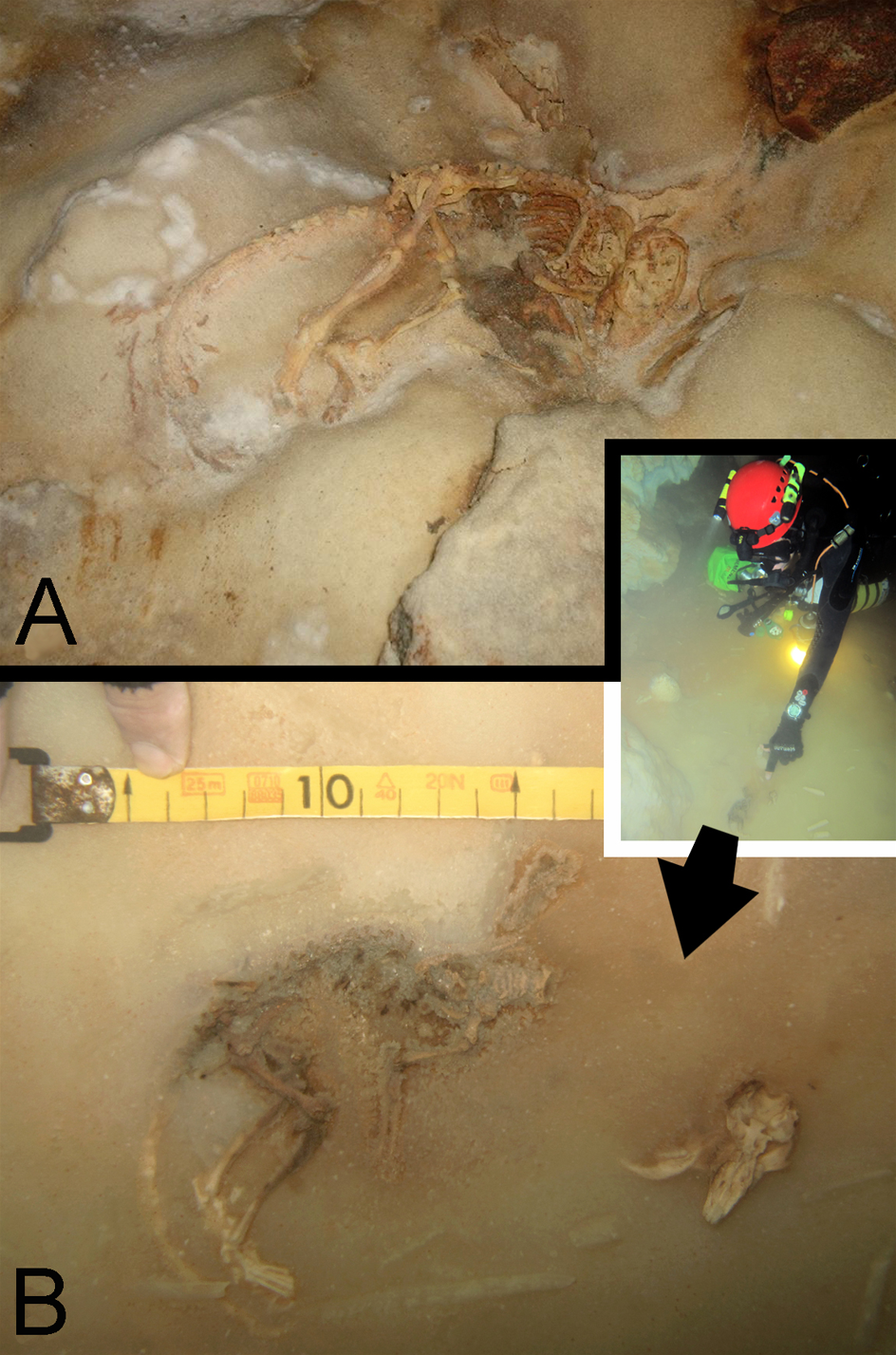
- H. morpheus

Scientific classification
- Kingdom: Animalia
- Phylum: Chordata
- Class: Mammalia
- Order: Rodentia
- Family: Gliridae
- Subfamily: Leithiinae
- Genus: †Hypnomys; Bate, 1918

Type species
- †Hypnomys mahonensis Bate, 1918

Species
- †H. eliomyoides; †H. morpheus; †H. onicensis; †H. waldreni; †H. mahonensis

= Hypnomys =

Hypnomys Temporal range: Early Pliocene–Holocene

Extinct genus of giant dormice

Hypnomys, otherwise known as Balearic giant dormice, is an extinct genus of dormouse (Gliridae) in the subfamily Leithiinae. Its species are considered examples of insular gigantism. They were endemic to the Balearic Islands in the western Mediterranean from the Early Pliocene until their extinction around the 3rd millennium BC. They first appeared in the fossil record on Mallorca during the Early Pliocene (around 5 million years ago), presumably as a result to the evaporation of the Mediterranean sea during the Messinian salinity crisis (5.96-5.33 million years ago) connecting the Balearic Islands with mainland Europe. They later spread to Menorca, and a possible molar is also known from Ibiza. Hypnomys became extinct during the late Holocene (around 4500–4000 years ago) likely shortly after human arrival on the Balearics. They were one of only three native land mammals to the islands at the time of human arrival, alongside the shrew Nesiotites and goat-antelope Myotragus. Their closest living relatives are of the genus Eliomys, including the European garden dormouse (Eliomys quercinus).

== History of discovery ==
The first remains of Hypnomys were discovered in 1910 on the island of Mallorca in the Balearic Islands by British palaeontologist Dorothea Bate, with remains also found by Bate on Menorca a year later. Upon first examination, Bate considered the fossils to represent those of Eliomys or Leithia, but in 1918 described the remains into the new genus Hypnomys, describing two species, H. morpheus on Mallorca, and H. mahonensis on Menorca.

== Taxonomy and evolutionary history ==
Mitochondrial DNA from H. morpheus indicates that Hypnomys is a member of the subfamily Leithiinae, and closely related to the genus Eliomys, which contains (among others) the European garden dormouse (Eliomys quercinus). The divergence estimated by molecular clock between modern species of Eliomys and Hypnomys in a 2019 study was 13.67 million years ago.

Cladogram of dormice showing the placement of Hypnomys after Bover et al. 2020 and Petrova et al. 2024.

- Gliridae (dormice)
  - - Graphiurinae
      Graphiurus (African dormice)
    - Glirinae
      - Glirulus (Japanese dormouse)
      - Glis (edible dormice)
  - Leithiinae
    - Muscardinus (hazel dormouse)
    - - - Myomimus (mouse-tailed dormice)
        - Selevinia (desert dormouse)
      - - Dryomys (woolly and forest dormice)
        - - Eliomys (garden dormice)
          - †Hypnomys (Balearic dormice)

The ancestor of Hypnomys is often assumed to be the prehistoric Eliomys species E. truci, known from the latest Miocene of the Iberian Peninsula. However, the molar complexity of the earliest dormice remains on Mallorca (presumably ancestral to Hypnomys) and the deep divergence between modern Eliomys and Hypnomys has led to suggestions that Hypnomys descended from a now extinct dormouse genus, possibly Vasseuromys or a closely related form.

Hypnomys likely arrived in Mallorca during the Messinian salinity crisis (5.96–5.3 million years ago), an event when the Strait of Gibraltar closed and the Mediterranean evaporated, with the resulting sea level drop causing the exposure of the continental shelf, allowing dispersal from the Iberian Peninsula to the Balearic Islands, before the islands again became isolated following the reopening of the Straits of Gibraltar and the resulting Zanclean flood which refilled the Mediterranean approximately 5.3 million years ago, at the beginning of the Pliocene. Following this, the Balearic Islands were extremely remote, with no examples of terrestrial vertebrates arriving from the mainland in Mallorca and Menorca until human arrival during the late Holocene, allowing evolution to occur in long-term isolation. Although during the Early Pliocene some other mammals like hamsters and murids were present, by the Late Pliocene, Hypnomys represented one of three mammals present in Mallorca, alongside the goat-antelope Myotragus and the shrew Nesiotites. Hypnomys, Myotragus and Nesiotites dispersed from Mallorca to Menorca during the Pliocene-Pleistocene transition as part of a faunal turnover event replacing the fauna of Menorca, which had previously differed from Mallorca (containing species such as the giant rabbit Nuralagus rex), likely due to the islands being connected during episodes of low sea level as a result of Pleistocene glaciation. A tooth possibly belonging to Hypnomys is known from the Cova de ca na Reia site on Ibiza (Eivissa), of an uncertain Plio-Pleistocene age; however the assignment to Hypnomys is not definitive.

=== Species ===
Hypnomys is divided into a number of species, spanning from the Pliocene to the Holocene. These are largely considered to be chronospecies (i.e. to have sequentially evolved from the previous species). As with many extinct mammal species, they are largely distinguished by dental anatomy.

- Hypnomys waldreni Reumer 1979 (Middle-Late Pliocene, Mallorca)
- Hypnomys onicensis Reumer 1994 (formerly H. intermedius Reumer, 1981, renamed due to a species of Eliomys with the same name) (Early Pleistocene, Mallorca)
- Hypnomys eliomyoides Agustí 1980 (Early Pleistocene, Menorca)
- Hypnomys morpheus Bate 1918 (Middle Pleistocene-Holocene, Mallorca)
- Hypnomys mahonensis Bate, 1918 (type) (Late Pleistocene-Holocene, Menorca)

Indeterminate remains of Hypnomys not assigned to species extend back to the Early Pliocene on Mallorca.

The species Hypnomys gollcheri de Bruijn, 1966 from the Pleistocene of Malta has been assigned to the separate genus Maltamys.

Although Hypnomys was considered a subgenus of Eliomys by Zammit Maempel and de Bruijn, 1982 it has generally been considered distinct by other authors.

The Late Pleistocene-Holocene Menorcan H. mahonesis is distinguished from H. morpheus by its simpler teeth morphology and generally larger body size, although the body size of H. morpheus varied substantially over the course of the glacial cycles, at times reaching sizes typical for H. mahonesis.

== Description ==
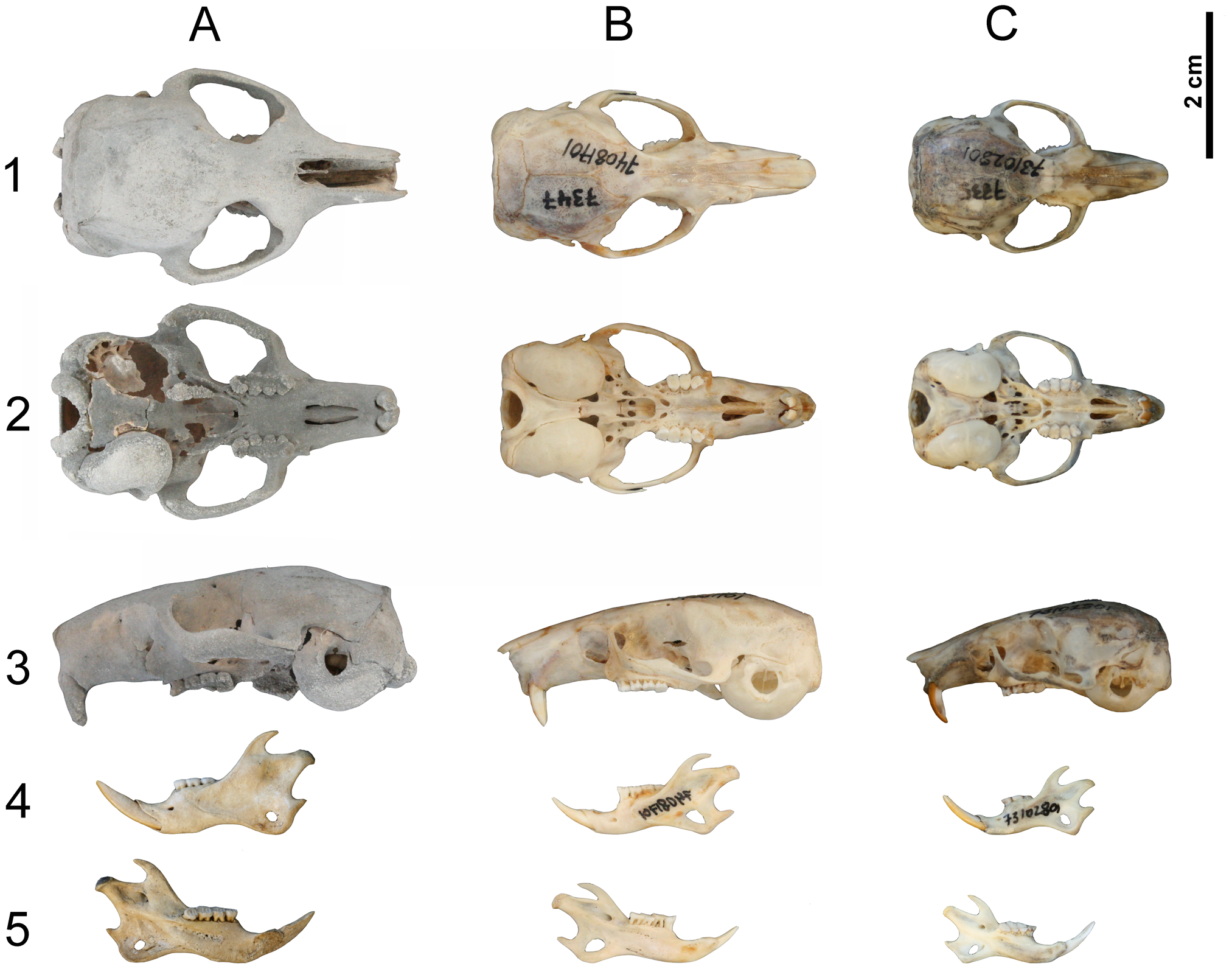
The skull and mandible of H. morpheus (left) compared with the garden dormouse (Eliomys quercinus) including the giant population from Formentera (centre), and normal morphology (right)

The overall body size of Hypnomys is considerably larger than mainland dormice species, with the overall body size of the lineage gradually increasing over time. An articulated specimen of Hypnomys cf. onicensis measured in a 2010 study had a head and body length of around 15 centimetres (5.9 in) and a tail length of around 10 centimetres (3.9 in). A specimen of H. morpheus measured in the same study was found to have a head and body length of about 18 centimetres (7.1 in) and a tail length of about 11.5 centimetres (4.5 in). The tail lengths are proportionally shorter than in species of Eliomys. The specimen of H. morpheus was estimated to weigh between 173 and 284 grams (0.381 and 0.626 lb). In comparison to species of Eliomys, the skull and mandibles of Hypnomys species are substantially more robust. The robustness of the mandibles and zygomatic arches of the skull indicate the presence of well developed masseter muscles. The limbs are also robust, with elongated zygopodiums (part of the limbs between the foot and elbow/knee) on both hind and forelimbs.

== Paleobiology ==
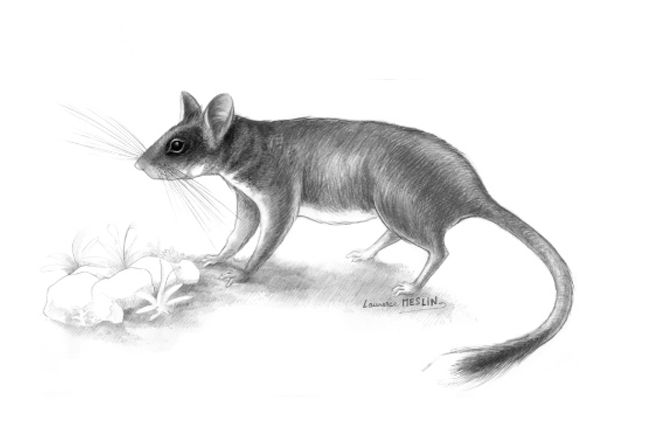
Life restoration of H. morpheus

A 2016 bone histology study found that H. onicensis could live over 10 years, an exceptionally long lifespan in comparison to living Eliomys, which can only live up to 5 years. Young juveniles were found to be already substantially larger than equivalently aged Eliomys individuals. Sexual maturity was also likely delayed in comparison to living Eliomys. In a dental microwear study of H. morpheus the high number of fine scratches on the teeth suggests that the species was more omnivorous than the garden dormouse (which is heavily carnivorous), with the presence of pits on the teeth indicating the intake of hard food such as nuts and seeds, or grit, An analysis of the morphology of the lower jaw suggests that was probably efficient at gnawing and chewing. The lifestyle of Hypnomys has been debated. A 2010 study concluded that H. morpheus was more terrestrial than living dormice, based on morphological comparison of the bone proportions. However, a 2014 study disputed this, finding based on the proportions of the limb bones that H. morpheus was likely arboreal, and possibly also had fossorial (digging) capabilities. Analysis of the cribriform plate of a probable specimen of H. morpheus suggests that the species probably had a well developed senses of sight, hearing and smell, the last possibly better developed than the living garden dormice. The former two have been suggested to have been for detecting predators, while the last aided in finding food. While the Balearic Islands lacked large terrestrial predators, Hypnomys was hunted by birds of prey such as owls which are known to have inhabited the islands.

== Extinction ==
Like the two other endemic mammal genera on the Balearic islands, the shrew Nesiotites and the goat-antelope Myotragus, Hypnomys likely rapidly became extinct after human arrival in the Balearic islands during the mid-late 3rd millennium BC. The youngest current radiocarbon dates for H. morpheus are a few thousand years prior to human arrival, but later dates much closer to human arrival for Nesiotites and Myotragus suggest that it was also present at the time of arrival. Direct predation by humans is an unlikely cause of extinction for Hypnomys. Predators currently present on the Balearic Islands such as cats, weasels, martins and genets were introduced to the islands long after the extinction of the endemic mammals, and there is no compelling evidence for the early presence of dogs. The garden dormouse (Eliomys quercinus) and wood mouse (Apodemus sylvaticus) were early introductions to the islands and may have competed with Hypnomys, though there is no concrete evidence that their existences overlapped. Diseases spread by introduced species may have contributed to the extinction. The two other native pre-human terrestrial vertebrates of Mallorca and Menorca, the still living Lilford's wall lizard (Podarcis lilfordi) and Majorcan midwife toad (Alytes muletensis) have been heavily impacted by human presence on the archipelago, and today are only confined to remote areas.

== See also ==
- Holocene extinction
- List of extinct animals of Europe
- Leithia a rabbit sized giant dormouse known from the Pleistocene of Sicily and Malta, largest known dormouse
